= Shih Che =

Taiwanese politician (born 1969)

- 史哲
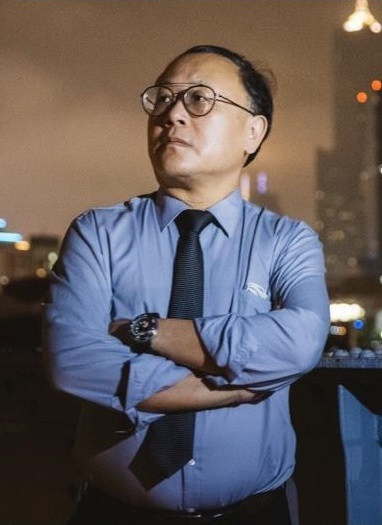
- Shih in 2020

Chairman of the Taiwan High Speed Rail Corporation
- Incumbent
- Assumed office 16 June 2025
- Preceded by: James Jeng

Minister without Portfolio
- In office 20 May 2024 – 12 June 2025
- Premier: Cho Jung-tai

5th Minister of Culture
- In office 31 January 2023 – 20 May 2024
- Premier: Chen Chien-jen
- Preceded by: Lee Yung-te
- Succeeded by: Li Yuan

Deputy Mayor of Kaohsiung
- In office 24 August 2020 – 30 January 2023
- Mayor: Chen Chi-mai
- Preceded by: Wang Shih-fang (acting)
- In office 12 September 2016 – 24 December 2018
- Mayor: Chen Chu; Hsu Li-ming (acting)
- Succeeded by: Yeh Kuang-shih; Lee Shu-chuan

Personal details
- Born: 14 July 1969 (age 57) Taipei, Taiwan
- Party: Democratic Progressive Party
- Spouse: Lee Shu-chen
- Children: 3 sons
- Parent: Shih Ying (father)
- Education: Tunghai University (BS)

Shih Che (Chinese: 史哲; born 14 July 1969) is a Taiwanese politician. He was the Minister of Culture under the Chen Chien-jen cabinet. Before his ministerial office, he had served as the deputy mayor of Kaohsiung and the director of the Department of Information and the Bureau of Cultural Affairs of the Kaohsiung City Government.

== Early life and education ==
Shih Che is the son of Shih Ying, an academic and advocate of educational reform. Shih Che earned a degree within Tunghai University's computer science department. While he was attending Tunghai, Shih participated in the Wild Lily student movement.

== Political career ==
Shih Che was a private secretary for Liao Yung-lai. In 2004, he was appointed to head the Bureau of Labor Insurance. He resigned that position in 2006. He served in several positions within the Kaohsiung City Government. During Chen Chu's mayoralty, Shih was the director-general of the municipal Department of Information through 2009, then led the city's Bureau of Cultural Affairs. By 2017, Shih had become deputy mayor of Kaohsiung. He was replaced during the mayoralty of Han Kuo-yu, and returned to the deputy mayorship when Chen Chi-mai succeeded Han.

In January 2023, Shih was appointed minister of culture. In May 2024, Shih was appointed a minister without portfolio in Lai Ching-te's incoming presidential administration. In June 2025, Shih replaced James Jeng as chair of the Taiwan High Speed Rail Corporation. Citing a steady increase in ridership after the COVID-19 pandemic in Taiwan, Shih announced plans to add train service from July 2025 and move toward digital ticketing. Shih later commented that restrictions on riding without a reserved ticket would be enforced starting in 2026.
