= 2020 Kaohsiung mayoral by-election =

By-election in Kaohsiung held after the 2020 mayoral recall vote

- 15 August 2020
- Turnout: 41.83%
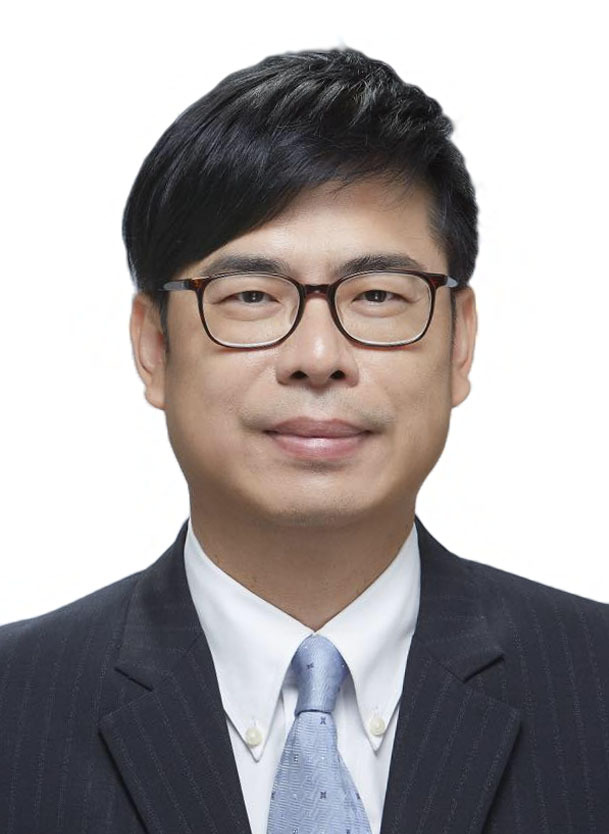

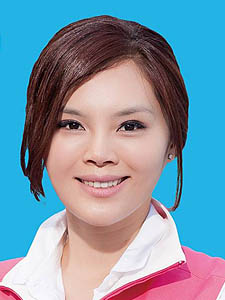
Nominee	Chen Chi-mai	Li Mei-jhen
Party	DPP	Kuomintang
Popular vote	671,804	248,478
Percentage	70.03%	25.90%
- 2020 Kaohsiung by-election results by district
Mayor before election
Yang Ming-jou (acting)
Independent
Elected mayor
Chen Chi-mai
DPP

The 2020 Kaohsiung mayoral by-election was held on 15 August 2020 following a successful recall attempt. The registered candidates were Chen Chi-mai representing the Democratic Progressive Party, Li Mei-jhen representing the Kuomintang, and Wu Yi-jheng representing the Taiwan People's Party. Chen Chi-mai won the by-election by a landslide margin with slightly over 70 percent of the votes. He replaced acting mayor Yang Ming-jou on 24 August 2020.

== Background ==
The by-election followed a successful recall attempt against Kaohsiung mayor Han Kuo-yu on 6 June 2020. By law, the Central Election Commission (CEC) was mandated to announce the results of the recall vote within seven days of the vote itself. The law also required the CEC to hold a by-election no later than 11 September 2020, three months after the results of the recall were publicly announced. The CEC confirmed the result on 12 June and announced that the by-election would be held on 15 August.

== Procedures and timetable ==
Han Kuo-yu is barred, by law, from contesting the Kaohsiung mayoralty for four years as a result of the successful recall petition.

Registration of candidates took place between 20 June and 24 June. The sole debate between all three candidates took place on 1 August. Municipal infrastructure was discussed.

== Candidates ==
Following a meeting of the Central Standing Committee of the Democratic Progressive Party on 17 June 2020, Chen Chi-mai was nominated as the DPP candidate for the by-election. On 23 June 2020, the Kuomintang selected Kaohsiung City Councillor Li Mei-jhen to contest the by-election. Following the Kuomintang's announcement, Wu Yi-jheng, a city councilor affiliated with the People First Party, joined the Taiwan People's Party to represent the TPP in the by-election.

== Opinion polling ==
Date	Pollster	Sample size	Chen Chi-mai DPP	Li Mei-jhen KMT	Wu Yi-jheng TPP	Leading by (points)
29 July – 2 August 2020	TPP (All Dimensions)	903	46.5%	12.8%	11.5%	33.7
30–31 July 2020	Formosa	1,071	52.4%	12.6%	5.3%	39.8
27–28 July 2020	Taiwan Brian Trust	1,082	53.7%	14.4%	8.3%	39.3
21–28 July 2020	All Dimensions	750	39.1%	16.0%	8.9%	23.1
22–24 July 2020	TVBS	919	55%	21%	5%	34
9–10 July 2020	Formosa	1,070	52.9%	14.3%	4.4%	38.6
29 June – 1 July 2020	TVBS	953	54%	22%	5%	32
29–30 June 2020	TISR	1,077	54.6%	14.4%	4.0%	40.2

== Results ==
Candidate	Party	Votes	%
Chen Chi-mai	Democratic Progressive Party	671,804	70.03
Li Mei-jhen	Kuomintang	248,478	25.90
Wu Yi-jheng	Taiwan People's Party	38,960	4.06
Total		959,242	100.00
Valid votes		959,242	99.63
Invalid/blank votes		3,584	0.37
Total votes		962,826	100.00
Registered voters/turnout		2,301,597	41.83

Chen Chi-mai won 671,804 of the votes cast on 15 August 2020, a vote share of 70.03%. Li Mei-jhen finished second with 248,478 votes or 25.9%. Wu Yi-jhen claimed 4.06% of the vote, a total of 38,960 ballots. Voter turnout was 41.83%. The Central Election Commission certified Chen's electoral victory on 21 August 2020. On 24 August 2020, Chen replaced acting mayor Yang Ming-jou.

2020 Kaohsiung by-election results by district
District	Electorate	Total votes	Chen Chi-mai	%	Li Mei-jhen	%	Wu Yi-jheng	%	Invalid votes	Turnout
Yancheng	21,055	9,961	7,113	71.73	2,381	24.01	423	4.27	44	47.31%
Gushan	113,538	47,245	31,799	67.51	13,315	28.27	1,990	4.22	141	41.61%
Zuoying	158,517	63,323	39,352	62.35	21,062	33.37	2,701	4.28	208	39.95%
Nanzih	151,733	62,029	42,700	69.12	16,730	27.08	2,344	3.79	255	40.88%
Sanmin	281,098	119,051	85,121	71.74	28,434	23.97	5,091	4.29	405	42.35%
Sinsing	43,352	19,247	12,833	66.95	5,135	26.79	1,200	6.26	79	44.40%
Cianjin	23,646	10,474	6,954	66.67	2,811	26.95	665	6.38	44	44.30%
Lingya	142,696	62,078	41,222	66.65	16,903	27.33	3,722	6.02	231	43.50%
Cianjhen	157,241	68,668	48,346	70.64	17,295	25.27	2,803	4.10	224	43.67%
Cijin	23,940	10,030	7,642	76.49	2,089	20.91	260	2.60	39	41.90%
Siaogang	129,652	52,747	38,358	72.96	12,269	23.34	1,947	3.70	173	40.68%
Fongshan	294,369	121,720	82,698	68.19	33,561	27.67	5,015	4.14	446	41.35%
Linyuan	57,682	24,014	18,143	75.89	4,905	20.52	858	3.59	108	41.63%
Daliao	95,149	38,962	28,357	73.04	9,180	23.64	1,289	3.32	136	40.95%
Dashu	35,739	15,579	11,738	75.66	3,321	21.41	456	2.94	64	43.59%
Dashe	29,293	12,832	9,702	75.93	2,634	20.61	442	3.46	54	43.81%
Renwu	74,502	31,307	23,305	74.74	6,708	21.51	1,170	3.75	124	42.02%
Niaosong	39,030	16,810	12,005	71.62	4,076	24.32	681	4.06	48	43.07%
Gangshan	79,254	33,527	22,854	68.45	9,327	27.93	1,209	3.62	137	42.30%
Ciaotou	32,724	16,053	12,372	77.32	2,982	18.64	647	4.04	52	49.06%
Yanchao	25,353	10,691	7,834	73.68	2,480	23.32	319	3.00	58	42.17%
Tianliao	6,408	2,592	1,961	75.95	561	21.73	60	2.32	10	40.45%
Alian	23,839	9,838	7,611	77.69	1,905	19.44	281	2.87	41	41.27%
Lujhu	42,420	17,395	12,465	71.96	4,052	23.39	806	4.65	72	41.01%
Hunei	25,136	9,763	7,409	76.19	2,008	20.65	307	3.16	39	38.84%
Qieding	25,543	9,894	7,419	75.29	2,209	22.42	226	2.29	40	38.73%
Yong'an	11,698	4,745	3,420	72.37	1,141	24.14	165	3.49	19	40.56%
Mituo	15,902	6,769	4,655	69.16	1,868	27.75	208	3.09	38	42.57%
Zihguan	30,269	13,795	10,444	76.02	2,842	20.69	452	3.29	57	45.57%
Cishan	30,757	12,683	8,798	69.67	3,359	26.60	472	3.74	54	41.24%
Meinong	34,062	13,435	7,895	59.02	5,125	38.31	356	2.66	59	39.44%
Liouguei	10,868	3,514	2,319	66.50	1,088	31.20	80	2.29	27	32.33%
Jiasian	5,222	1,863	1,077	58.22	738	39.89	35	1.89	13	35.68%
Shanlin	10,210	3,539	2,219	63.09	1,222	34.75	76	2.16	22	34.66%
Neimen	12,507	4,592	3,077	67.24	1,357	29.65	142	3.10	16	36.72%
Maolin	1,524	538	104	19.33	403	74.91	31	5.76	0	35.30%
Taoyuan	3,338	862	245	28.42	597	69.26	20	2.32	4	25.94%
Namasia	2,331	657	238	36.39	405	61.93	11	1.68	3	28.19%
