= Yeh Kuang-shih =

Taiwanese politician

- 葉匡時
- Official portrait, 2018

Mayor of Kaohsiung
- Acting; 16 October 2019 – 11 January 2020
- Preceded by: Han Kuo-yu
- Succeeded by: Han Kuo-yu

Minister of Transportation and Communications
- In office 18 February 2013 – 9 January 2015
- Prime Minister: Jiang Yi-huah
- Preceded by: Mao Chi-kuo
- Succeeded by: Chen Jian-yu
Additional positions
Deputy Mayor of Kaohsiung
In office 25 December 2018 – 12 June 2020 Serving with Lee Shu-chuan
Mayor	Han Kuo-yu; Himself (acting)
Succeeded by	Wang Shih-fang
Political Deputy Minister of Transportation and Communications
In office June 2009 – February 2013
Minister	Mao Chi-kuo
Succeeded by	Chen Chwen-jing
Deputy Minister of the Research, Development and Evaluation Commission
In office May 2008 – June 2009
Minister	Jiang Yi-huah

Personal details
- Born: 7 January 1957 (age 69) Hualien City, Hualien County, Taiwan
- Party: Kuomintang
- Education: National Taiwan University (BA); University of Delaware (MPA); Carnegie Mellon University (PhD)

Yeh Kuang-shih (Chinese: 葉匡時; pinyin: Yè Kuāngshí; born 7 January 1957) is a Taiwanese politician and management scientist. He was the Minister of Transportation and Communications from 2013 to 2015, and served as the interim Mayor of Kaohsiung from 2019 to 2020 during Han Kuo-yu's presidential run.

== Early life and education ==
Yeh Kuang-shih was born in Hualien City in 1957. His parents are immigrants from Zhejiang, China. He graduated from National Taiwan University with a bachelor's degree in political science in 1979, then completed graduate studies in the United States. He earned a master's degree in public administration at University of Delaware in 1984 and his Ph.D. in organization theory and policy analysis from Carnegie Mellon University in 1990. His doctoral dissertation was titled, "Models for careers and internal labor markets with implications for human resource management in organizations".

== Academic career ==
Yeh was a professor at Sun Yat-sen University in Department of Business Administration from 1991 to 2015. He has more than 30 publications in peer-reviewed journals and has written several books on business administration.

After resigning from his post as the Minister of Transportation and Communications in 2015, Yeh left Sun Yat-sen University for the Graduate Institute of Technology Innovation & Intellectual Property Management at National Chengchi University. He retired in 2018.

== Political career ==
Yeh served as the Deputy Minister of the Research, Development and Evaluation Commission from 2008 to 2009. During his time he participated in the Organizational Reform of Executive Yuan.

From 2009 to 2013 Yeh served as the Political Deputy Minister of Transportation and Communications. During this time, he instituted Taoyuan International Airport Corporation, the operator of the Taiwan Taoyuan International Airport, and served as the first chairman.

=== Minister of Transportation and Communications ===
After Premier Sean Chen stepped down in 2013, Yeh replaced Mao Chi-kuo as the Minister of Transportation and Communications.

==== 2013 Nantou earthquake ====
Right after an earthquake struck Taiwan on 27 March 2013, Yeh ordered all officials within the ministry departments to conduct checks on any damage caused by the earthquake.

==== Taoyuan International Airport MRT delay ====
Commenting on the completion delay of Taoyuan International Airport MRT in mid April 2013, Yeh said that he hoped that the line can be opened somewhere before October 2014, after the ROC Ministry of Transportation and Communications had postponed it from its original June 2013 official launch. He added that the delay is caused by the MRT electromechanical systems in which it is still currently being worked out by the appointed contractor.

In early May 2013 during a session at the Transportation Committee of the Legislative Yuan, Yeh became the target of heavy criticism due to the ongoing delay of the airport MRT completion, even the DPP asked Yeh to resign as his responsibility of the delay. Yeh responded by stating that he had already questioned the train signaling system contractor legitimacy and the tender process in choosing the contractors. He added that any dispute regarding the tender and bidding process had long been officially closed since the investigator could not find anything illegal. However, he promised to further submit all of the information found to prosecutor for further investigation.

==== ROC first casino ====
After the Executive Yuan approval in early May 2013 in establishing ROC first casino, Yeh said that ROC government considers that the casino will be established in Lienchiang, Fukien Province, not in Taiwan Island. He expected that the casino resort will house the casino, hotel, convention and other facilities. The casino resort is expected to be established in 2019 the earliest.

==== Resignation ====
On January 7, 2015, which happens to be Yeh's birthday, Yeh resigned after failure to secure support from his party to Taiwan High Speed Rail Corporation’s (THSRC) financial restructuring plan. The plan was perceived by some lawmakers to benefit the investors more than the public, or unnecessary because THSRC is not in imminent danger to go bankrupt, or the government should let the corp go bankrupt. A modified version of the financial restructuring plan was passed later that year.

Later that year, he became an adviser to Hung Hsiu-chu's presidential campaign. Hung was eventually replaced by Eric Chu to represent the party in the election.

=== Kaohsiung City Government ===
Yeh was appointed deputy mayor of Kaohsiung in December 2018 by Han Kuo-yu, serving alongside Lee Shu-chuan and Chen Hsiung-wen. He mainly focused on policies related to economic development, transportation, tourism, culture, and education.

==== Mayor of Kaohsiung ====
On 16 October 2019, Han took on leave from his position as Mayor of Kaohsiung to be able to run in the 2020 Taiwanese presidential election. Yeh, was subsequently ascended into the mayorship during the suspension of Han. After Han lost the presidential election, he returned as Mayor, and Yeh returned his role as deputy mayor.

He was recalled in June 2020 after the recall of mayor Han and his city cabinet.
