= Chen Che-nan =

Taiwanese politician

Chen Che-nan MLY
- 陳哲男

Member of the Legislative Yuan
- In office 1 February 1993 – December 1994
- Constituency: Kaohsiung 1
- In office 1 February 1987 – 31 January 1993
- Constituency: Education

Acting Secretary-General to the President
- In office 1 August 2000 – 5 October 2000
- President: Chen Shui-bian
- Preceded by: Chang Chun-hsiung
- Succeeded by: Yu Shyi-kun

Personal details
- Born: 30 March 1941 (age 85) Taiwan
- Party: Independent (2005–present); Kuomintang (until 1992); Democratic Progressive Party (1993–2005)
- Children: Chen Chi-mai (son)
- Education: National Taiwan Normal University (BEd)

Chen Che-nan (Chinese: 陳哲男; pinyin: Chén Zhénán; born 30 March 1941) is a Taiwanese retired politician. Chen was a member of the Legislative Yuan from 1987 to 1994. Originally affiliated with the Kuomintang, he joined the Democratic Progressive Party in 1993. He later served briefly as the acting Secretary-General to the President from August 2000 to October 2000.

== Early life and career ==
Born in 1941 during Japanese rule, Chen was an elementary school teacher prior to a career in politics. He graduated from National Taiwan Normal University.

== Political career ==
In the 1970s, Chen began his political career in the Kaohsiung City Government. He was elected to the Legislative Yuan for the first time in 1986, and stepped down in 1994, in the midst of a term. Chen then served the Taipei City Government and mayor Chen Shui-bian in multiple positions, until joining the ROC Presidential Office in 2000, where he continued advising Chen Shui-bian.

== Controversy ==
Chen was expelled from the Kuomintang on 2 December 1992, after becoming increasingly critical of party leaders, and due to his support of the One China, one Taiwan" notion. His expulsion from the party happened in the midst of a legislative election, but occurred too late for the KMT to officially pull their support of him. Listed on the ballot as a KMT candidate for Kaohsiung, he won and took office nonetheless. Despite expulsion, Chen's vote share was still allocated to the KMT for the purposes of determining party list proportional representation. He joined the Democratic Progressive Party the next year. Businessman Chen You-hao named Chen Che-nan as one of the people who helped Chen Shui-bian solicit donations for Chen Shui-bian's 1998 Taipei mayoral campaign and the 2000 presidential campaign. In a separate case also involving black gold politics, Chen Che-nan was found to have used his political influence to secure favorable court rulings for businessman Liang Po-hsun. The Taipei District Court ruled in December 2006 that Chen was to serve twelve years in prison. An appeal to the Taiwan High Court shortened the sentence to nine years. A retrial of the Liang–Chen case was later heard by the Taiwan High Court in 2010. Presiding judge Tseng ter-shui convicted Chen of fraud, a lesser charge that dramatically reduced Chen's sentence to seven months imprisonment, which was again appealed. Chen Heng-kuan, one of three High Court judges to hear the case, considered resigning his position. The same court ruled in March 2013 that Chen Che-nan was to serve eight years imprisonment. The Supreme Court reduced Chen's sentence by one year in November 2014. Chen began serving the seven-year prison sentence in Kaohsiung weeks later. He was released on parole in October 2017.

Chen Che-nan was deeply involved in the 2005 Kaohsiung MRT foreign workers scandal. This led to his expulsion from the Democratic Progressive Party later that year. Chen also lost an Order of Brilliant Star, awarded in 2002, and an Order of Propitious Clouds, awarded in 2004. As a further consequence of the scandal, Chen left his post as national policy adviser. In 2007, the Kaohsiung District Court dropped all corruption charges against Chen.
