= Yang Ming-jou =

Taiwanese politician

- 楊明州
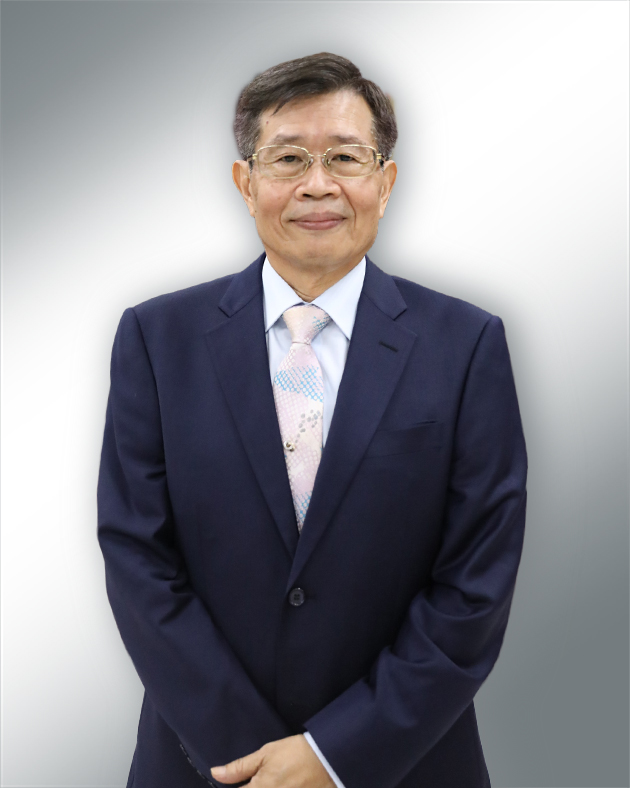
- Official portrait, 2023

Mayor of Kaohsiung
- Acting; 13 June 2020 – 24 August 2020
- Preceded by: Han Kuo-yu
- Succeeded by: Chen Chi-mai
Additional positions
Chairman of the Taiwan Sugar Corporation
In office 20 April 2023 – 28 October 2024
President	Chen Li-jen
Preceded by	Chen Jau-ih
Succeeded by	Liu Chi-hsiao (acting)
Secretary-General of Kaohsiung City Government
In office 24 August 2020 – 15 January 2022
Mayor	Chen Chi-mai
Preceded by	Chen Hung-ih
Succeeded by	Kuo Tien-kuei
In office 25 December 2018 – 9 September 2019
Mayor	Han Kuo-yu
Preceded by	Chen Hung-ih
Succeeded by	Chen Hung-ih
In office 19 November 2015 – 15 February 2018
Mayor	Chen Chu
Succeeded by	Chen Hung-ih
Deputy Mayor of Kaohsiung
In office 26 February 2018 – 25 December 2018
Mayor	Chen Chu; Hsu Li-ming
Preceded by	Hsu Ming-chun
Succeeded by	Lee Shu-chuan

Personal details
- Born: 13 October 1956 (age 70) Changhua County, Taiwan
- Party: Independent
- Education: National Cheng Kung University (BS, MS)

Yang Ming-jou (Chinese: 楊明州; born 13 October 1956) is a Taiwanese politician who has been the Mayor of Kaohsiung from June to August 2020.

== Political career ==
He had served many roles in the Kaohsiung City Government from 1984 to 2022, including secretary-general, deputy mayor, etc.

On 13 June 2020, he was appointed by the Executive Yuan as the acting Mayor of Kaohsiung after the dismissal of the city government cabinet of Han Kuo-yu in the 2020 Kaohsiung mayoral recall vote.

After his brief term as mayor, he served as the Chairman of Taiwan Sugar Corporation from 2023 until his resignation in 2024.
