= Han fans =

Fan of Han Kuo-yu

"Han fans" (Chinese: 韓粉; pinyin: hánfěn; Wade–Giles: han^{2}fên^{3}) is a term that began to refer to a group of Han Kuo-yu supporters in 2019, as active supporters emerged when Han ran on behalf of Kuomintang in the 2018 Kaohsiung mayoral election. "Han fans" began to be used over time by those with negative views of Han, and since then, "Han fans" has been used to describe extreme and irrational groups; the term has also been widely used in news reports.

== Composition ==
As of 2018, some of the Han fans are young, but core Han fans are middle-aged, elderly man, and have anti-Green tendencies. Han's key advisers observed that Han had spoken bluntly, attracting many lower-class grassroots classes; the main reason was that they were unhappy with the DPP's pension reform policy.

== See also ==
- Right-wing populism#Taiwan
