= Lee Chia-fen =

Taiwanese educator and politician

- 李佳芬
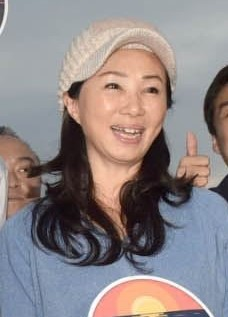
- Lee in 2018

First Lady of Kaohsiung
- In role 25 December 2018 – 12 June 2020
- Mayor: Han Kuo-yu
- Succeeded by: Wu Hung

Yunlin County Councillor
- In office 1 March 1998 – 28 February 2010
- Constituency: Yunlin IV

Personal details
- Born: 10 August 1963 (age 62) Xiluo, Yunlin, Taiwan
- Party: Kuomintang
- Spouse: Han Kuo-yu (m. 1989)
- Education: Shih Hsin University (BS); National Chiayi University (MS)

Lee Chia-fen (Chinese: 李佳芬; pinyin: Lǐ Jiāfēn; Wade–Giles: Li^{3} Chia^{1}-fen^{1}; born 10 August 1963) is a Taiwanese school administrator and former politician. She is married to Han Kuo-yu.

== Early life and education ==
Lee was born to a family of politicians in Xiluo, Yunlin County. She graduated with her Bachelor of Science (B.S.) in radio, television and film from Shih Hsin University. She then earned a Master of Science (M.S.) in education from the National Chiayi University. Lee currently serves as vice chair in Victoria Academy. Lee has worked as a journalist, host at radio station, and served on the Yunlin County Council for three terms.

== Family ==
Lee's father, Lee Jih-kuei, used to be in the gravel business. He later served in the Yunlin County Council for three terms. However, due to his deteriorating health (asthma), Lee Chia-fen succeeded her father in office. Lee's family has a close relationship with Chang Jung-wei's family. Lee's younger brother Lee Ming-che has also served on the Yunlin County Council. Lee and her husband have two daughters (Han Bing Han Chin) and a son (Han Tien).
