= Han Kuo-yu =

Taiwanese politician (born 1957)

- 韓國瑜
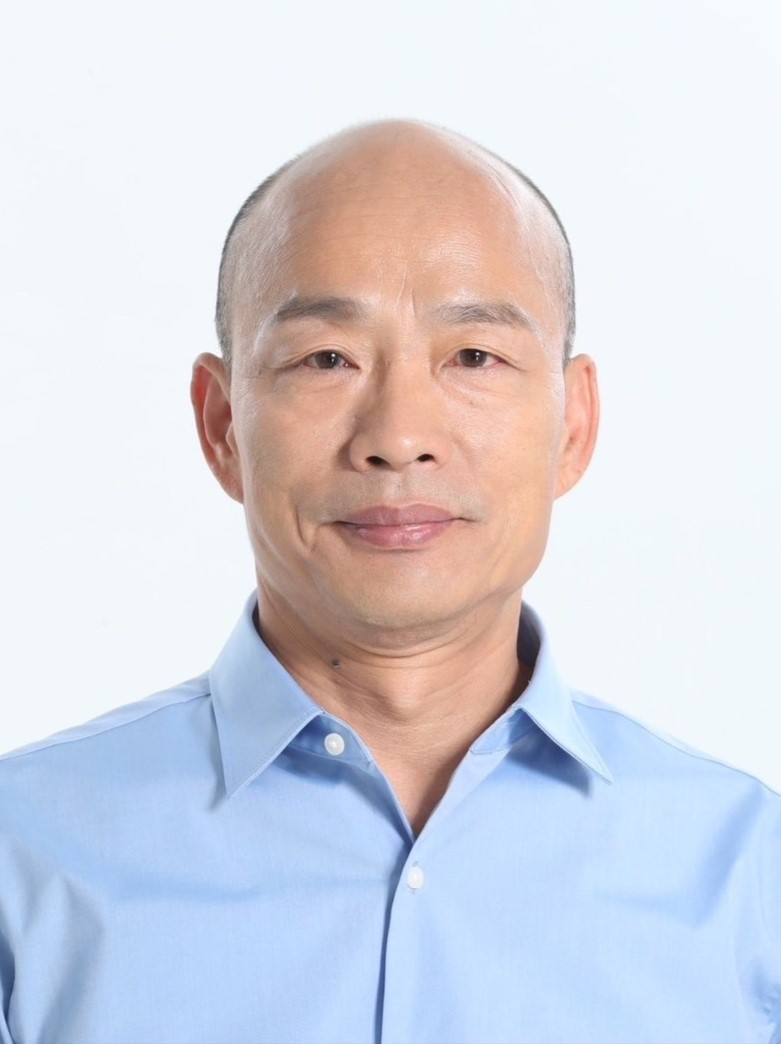
- Official portrait, 2024

13th President of the Legislative Yuan
- Incumbent
- Assumed office 1 February 2024
- Vice President: Johnny Chiang
- Preceded by: You Si-kun

2nd Mayor of Kaohsiung
- In office 25 December 2018 – 12 June 2020 (Note: Yeh Kuang-shih served as acting mayor from 16 October 2019 to 11 January 2020 during his presidential run in 2020.)
- Preceded by: Hsu Li-ming (a.i.)
- Succeeded by: Yang Ming-jou (a.i.)
Additional positions
4th Head of the Kuomintang Kaohsiung Chapter
In office 7 September 2017 – 19 January 2019
Chairman	Wu Den-yih
Preceded by	Huang Po-lin
Succeeded by	Chuang Chi-wang
4th General Manager of the Taipei Agricultural Products Marketing Corporation
In office 1 January 2013 – 31 March 2017
Mayor	Hau Lung-pin; Ko Wen-je
Preceded by	Chang Ching-liang
Succeeded by	Wu Ying-ning

Member of the Legislative Yuan
- Incumbent
- Assumed office 1 February 2024
- Constituency: Party-list (KMT)
- In office 1 February 1993 – 31 January 2002
- Constituency: Taipei County (1993–1999); Taipei County 3 (1999–2002)

Taipei County Councilor
- In office 1 March 1990 – 31 January 1993
- Constituency: Zhonghe District

Personal details
- Born: 17 June 1957 (age 69) Taipei County, Taiwan
- Party: Kuomintang
- Spouse: Lee Chia-fen (m. 1989)
- Children: 3
- Education: Republic of China Military Academy (BS); Soochow University (BA); National Chengchi University (MA); Peking University (PhD)
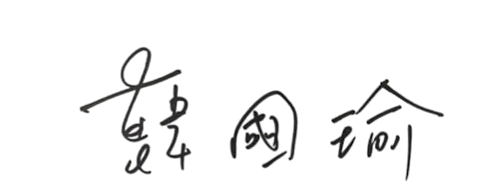
- Signature

Military service
- Branch/service: Republic of China Army
- Years of service: 1975–1981
- Rank: Captain
- Unit: 249th Field Division

Han Kuo-yu (Chinese: 韓國瑜; pinyin: Hán Guóyú; born 17 June 1957), (Note: Also known by his English name Daniel Han.) also known by his English name Daniel Han, is a Taiwanese politician and retired army officer who has served as the president of the Legislative Yuan since 2024. He is a member of the Kuomintang (KMT).

Born to a military family, Han graduated from the Republic of China Military Academy and served six years in the Republic of China Army as an officer. He studied English literature at Soochow University, earned a master's degree from National Chengchi University in 1988, and was a doctoral student at Peking University from 2001 to 2009. He first entered politics in 1990, when he won election to the Taipei County Council. From 1993 to 2002, Han represented a portion of Taipei County in the Legislative Yuan for three terms. Afterwards, he was the head of the state-owned Taipei Agricultural Products Marketing Company from 2013 to 2017.

Han ran unsuccessfully in the 2017 Kuomintang chairmanship election against Wu Den-yih, placing fourth. In 2018, Han ran for Mayor of Kaohsiung and won the election as a dark horse and populist candidate. He was the first member of the KMT to hold the office since 1998. The party nominated him as its candidate in the 2020 Taiwanese presidential election, though he lost to Tsai Ing-wen. In 2020, Han was recalled from his position as mayor. He returned to the Legislative Yuan after winning a party-list seat in the 2024 legislative election and was elected the president of the Legislative Yuan on February 1, 2024.

== Early life ==
Han was born on 17 June 1957 in Taipei County, Taiwan (now New Taipei City). His father, Han Ji-hua (韓濟華), and mother, Mo Yun-fang (莫蘊芳), were natives of Shangqiu, Henan, who trained as teachers at Shangqiu Normal College. After the outbreak of the Second Sino-Japanese War, his father graduated from the Republic of China Military Academy. Han Ji-hua subsequently served in the First Tank Battalion of the Chinese Expeditionary Force in the Battle of Northern Burma and Western Yunnan. While in Burma, Ji-hua commanded a tank division, and was later commemorated as a war hero in 2024.

Han was the fifth of six children, with two elder sisters, two elder brothers, and a younger brother, Han Kuo-yao (韓國瑤). His parents had relocated to Taiwan after the Chinese Civil War during the Great Retreat. He was raised in a military dependents' village. His family initially settled in Qingshui District, Taichung, before moving to Zhongli District, Taoyuan, and subsequently to Zhongzheng New Village (中正新村) in Banqiao District. After losing their home during Typhoon Gloria in 1963, the family moved to Shou-de New Village (壽德新村) in Zhonghe District. One of Han's childhood neighbors was the future legislator Lin Cheng-chieh, whose family also resided in Shou-de New Village.

== Education and military service ==
Han attended primary school at Banqiao Primary School and finished his schooling there in 1969. He then was among the first graduating class of Hai-Shan Junior High School in 1972. Afterwards, he attended Heng Yee Catholic Senior High School.

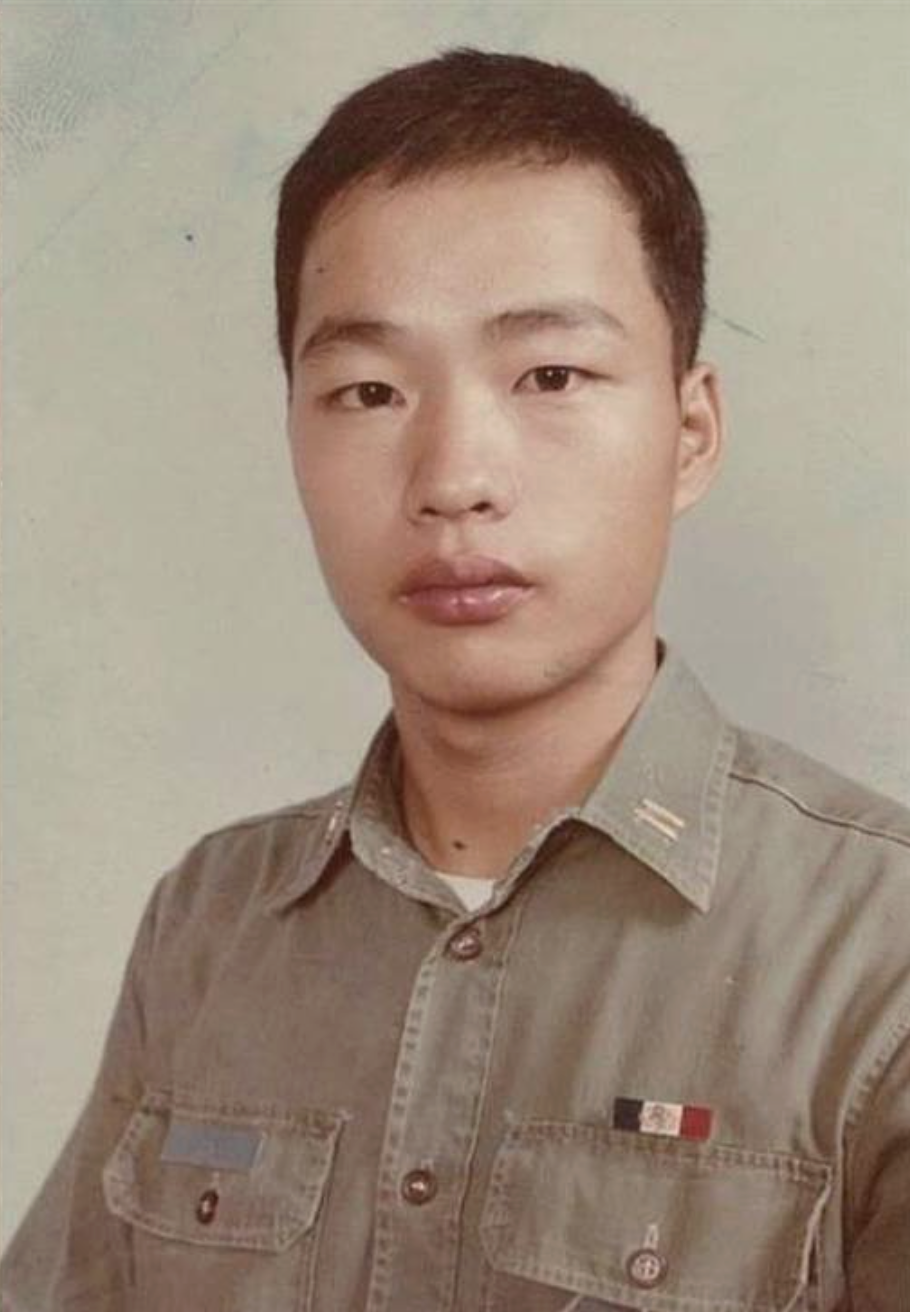
Han as a 19-year-old cadet at the Republic of China Military Academy

In 1975, Han enlisted in the army at age 18 and, after sitting the entrance examination, was admitted to the Republic of China Military Academy, where he became a member of the 40th class of its advanced training program. While attending the academy, Han defrayed his student expenses by working as a guard during the day and a telephone operator at night.

Han Kuo-yu
- Traditional Chinese: 韓國瑜
- Simplified Chinese: 韩国瑜
Transcriptions
Standard Mandarin
- Hanyu Pinyin: Hán Guóyú
- Bopomofo: ㄏㄢˊ ㄍㄨㄛˊㄩˊ
- Wade–Giles: Han^{2} Kuo^{2}-yü^{2}
- IPA: [xǎn kwǒ y̌]
Wu
- Wugniu: ghoe^{2} koq^{7} yu^{2}
- IPA: Shanghainese: [ɦø˨ koʔ˥ ɦy˨˩]
Yue: Cantonese
- Yale Romanization: Hòhn Gwokyùh
- Jyutping: hon^{4} gwok^{3} jyu^{4}
- IPA: [hɔn˩ kʷɔk̚˧ jy˧˥]
Southern Min
- Hokkien POJ: Hân Kok-jû

Han served six years in the Republic of China Army, during which period he was stationed in the Matsu Islands, commanded a motor transport unit, and spent his last service year in Hualien. He was discharged as a captain in April 1981. He then took the Joint College Entrance Examination for college admission and enrolled at Soochow University to study English. He graduated with a Bachelor of Arts in English literature in 1985. As an undergraduate, Han worked part-time as a security guard for an American club.

In 1988, Han earned a Master of Arts (M.A.) in East Asian studies from National Chengchi University. He wrote a 99-page master's thesis titled, "A study of negotiations during the 'Two Airlines Uprising' from the perspective of the CCP's United Front strategy" (Chinese: 從中共「對臺統戰」策略看兩航談判), which analyzed Chinese united front strategies and the efficacy of one country, two systems. His thesis advisor was the political scientist Su Chi.

Prior to running for public office, Han worked as a school principal. When he was 33 years old, he taught English and civics as a part-time teacher at Shih Hsin University, and lectured at Hualien Teachers' College and a journalism school. From 2001 to 2009, Han studied for a doctorate in political science and public administration at Peking University, where he was a Ph.D. student. As a doctoral student at Peking, he published an academic article in a Chinese journal, The Journal of Election Review (中華選舉研究學會刊), on recall elections in Taiwan in 2009. The university lists him as a 2009 Ph.D. graduate of the Guanghua School of Management, although Han stated in 2018 that he ultimately did not receive a degree.

== Taipei County Councilor (1990–1993) ==
While pursuing his graduate studies at National Chengchi University, Han attended classes during the day and worked as a mainland affairs researcher at the China Times during evenings; he initially began his graduate studies in international relations but switched to East Asian studies. His interest in politics led him to borrow NT$900,000 from close friends in order to launch an election campaign for a seat on the Taipei County Council. In the 1990 county council election, Han ran as an independent with the support of Apollo Chen, who had been elected to the council the previous year. He ultimately won the seat representing Zhonghe District on the Taipei County Council and took office on March 1, 1990.

Han was associated with the New Kuomintang Alliance, a political faction within the KMT, during the early 1990s. As a councilor, he helped to establish the Wenzheng Gongdao Hui (問政公道會), an informal council group whose members frequently conducted joint questioning of You Ching, the Democratic Progressive Party (DPP) county magistrate. On 16 November 1990, during an attempt to obstruct You's presentation of a county government report, Han threw a thermos toward the magistrate following a heated exchange. He then climbed onto You's desk and grabbed his necktie before councilor Wu Tsang-fu intervened to separate them. Han fell during the confrontation, sustained an injury to the back of his head and was hospitalized. Following his discharge from hospital, he shaved his head and publicly apologized to You in the council cafeteria.

During his council tenure, Han became involved in efforts to preserve the Hakka language and Hakka culture, working with Lai Yuan-lin and other organizers in 1990 to establish Hakka folk-song classes. On 18 April 1992, Han became the founding chairman of the Taipei County Hakka Hometown Association, established to preserve the Hakka language, promote traditional folk songs and encourage cultural exchange. He remained chairman of the association for its first two terms, from 1992 to 1998. His term on the Taipei County Council ended on 31 January 1993.

== Legislative Yuan (1992–2001) ==
=== Election and first term ===
Han was elected to the Legislative Yuan as a Kuomintang (KMT) candidate in the 1992 legislative election, receiving 81,845 votes in Taipei County on 19 December 1992. He subsequently served in the second, third and fourth Legislative Yuans, remaining in office until 31 January 2002.

On 5 May 1993, Han physically assaulted fellow legislator Chen Shui-bian of the Democratic Progressive Party (DPP) during a legislative confrontation. The dispute occurred during a meeting of the legislature's National Defense Committee concerning funding for services administered by the Veterans Affairs Council. Han overturned Chen's desk and slapped him after objecting to his remarks, and Chen was subsequently hospitalized for three days. Chen later explained that his criticism had concerned the government's treatment of military veterans rather than the veterans themselves.

In 1994, Han was among four KMT legislators representing Taipei County who became the targets of recall campaigns organized by anti-nuclear activists because of their support for the construction of the Lungmen Nuclear Power Plant. Under the electoral legislation then in force, a recall required participation by at least half of the constituency's eligible voters, with a majority of votes favoring removal. The recall votes failed because turnout reached only 21.36 percent, below the required threshold.

=== Reelection and committee assignments ===
Han began his second term on 1 February 1996, representing Taipei County's third electoral district. During his second term, Han maintained constituency service offices in Zhonghe and the Xizhi–Ruifang area. He began his third term on 1 February 1999.

During the fourth Legislative Yuan, Han served on the Budget and Final Accounts Committee in the first legislative session. He then served on the Procedure Committee and the Organic Laws and Statutes Committee during the second session, and on the Education and Culture Committee during the sixth session.

=== Kuomintang caucus leadership ===
By September 1999, Han was serving as leader of the KMT legislative caucus. Following the 1999 Jiji earthquake, the KMT, DPP and New Party caucuses reached an agreement to review an emergency decree for disaster relief and reconstruction, while abandoning a proposed two-week legislative recess. During the same period, Han called for the legislature to pass a military court-martial law bill before 1 October, warning that a delay would leave offenses committed by military personnel without an applicable legal framework.

In October 1999, Han participated in interparty negotiations to resolve a five-week legislative deadlock over the allocation of seats on the legislature's Finance Committee. The impasse had prevented the formation of other legislative committees and brought committee proceedings to a standstill. During negotiations, Han and New Party caucus leader Elmer Feng became involved in a physical confrontation. Following a compromise between the three major parties, Han attributed the agreement to external pressure on the legislature to resume its work.

In 2001, Han failed to secure his party's nomination through the KMT's internal legislative primary. The KMT subsequently placed him 33rd on its national party list for the 2001 Taiwanese legislative election, outside the range considered likely to secure election. He did not win another legislative term and subsequently withdrew from electoral politics for more than a decade.

== Taipei Agricultural Products Marketing Corporation (2013–2017) ==
In 2013, Han became general manager of the Taipei Agricultural Products Marketing Corporation (TAPMC). He introduced performance-oriented management practices, encouraging competition between the corporation's two wholesale produce markets and requiring auctioneers to work alongside farmers to better understand agricultural production. The corporation's annual transaction value increased from NT$17.1 billion in 2011 to more than NT$22 billion in 2015, although the increase largely reflected rising produce prices rather than growth in trading volume.

In 2016, Han became the subject of a political dispute over the corporation's leadership involving the Taipei City Government and the Council of Agriculture. Taipei mayor Ko Wen-je said that officials affiliated with the Democratic Progressive Party had sought Han's removal, prompting negotiations over his resignation. Han requested that the corporation's board accept his resignation in January 2017, citing disagreements over the municipal government's handling of the dispute. The board approved his resignation on 29 March, effective 31 March, as Han pursued the 2017 Kuomintang chairmanship election. He was eventually succeeded by Wu Yin-ning in June 2017.

== 2017 KMT chairmanship election ==
Results of the 2017 Kuomintang chairmanship election by county and city. Wu Den-yih won most jurisdictions, while Hung Hsiu-chu won the remainder

On 11 January 2017, Han announced his resignation as general manager of the Taipei Agricultural Products Marketing Corporation (TAPMC), amid speculation that he intended to seek the chairmanship of the KMT. The following day, he formally announced his candidacy at a press conference in Taipei, becoming the fourth candidate to enter the race after incumbent chairwoman Hung Hsiu-chu, former vice president Wu Den-yih, and former Taipei mayor Hau Lung-pin.

Han campaigned on reforming the KMT's organizational structure and increasing transparency in its management of party assets. He proposed placing the party's assets into a trust, resolving outstanding disputes through legal procedures, and making its financial affairs transparent. Han also advocated streamlining the party's administration into four departments responsible for the chairmanship, party organization, public opinion and policymaking, and overseas liaison. At the announcement, he additionally expressed his willingness to contest the 2018 mayoral elections in either Tainan or Kaohsiung if the party could not identify suitable candidates.

On 21 April 2017, Han was confirmed as one of six official candidates after meeting the requirement to submit valid endorsements from at least 3 percent of eligible party members. During the first televised policy presentation on 29 April, Han argued that voters had supported the Democratic Progressive Party (DPP) in the 2016 elections because of dissatisfaction with the KMT and hopes for improved living standards. He also questioned whether President Tsai Ing-wen had delivered the economic improvements that voters expected after the DPP assumed office. In the final week of campaigning, Han received endorsements from more than 20 pan-blue members of the Yunlin County Council.

The election was held on 20 May 2017, with Han finishing fourth among six candidates, receiving 16,141 votes, or 5.84 percent of the valid ballots. Wu Den-yih won the chairmanship in the first round with 144,408 votes (52.24 percent), defeating incumbent Hung Hsiu-chu, who received 53,063 votes (19.20 percent). In August 2017, Wu appointed Han chairman of the KMT's Kaohsiung chapter ahead of the following year's local elections.

== 2018 Kaohsiung mayoral campaign ==
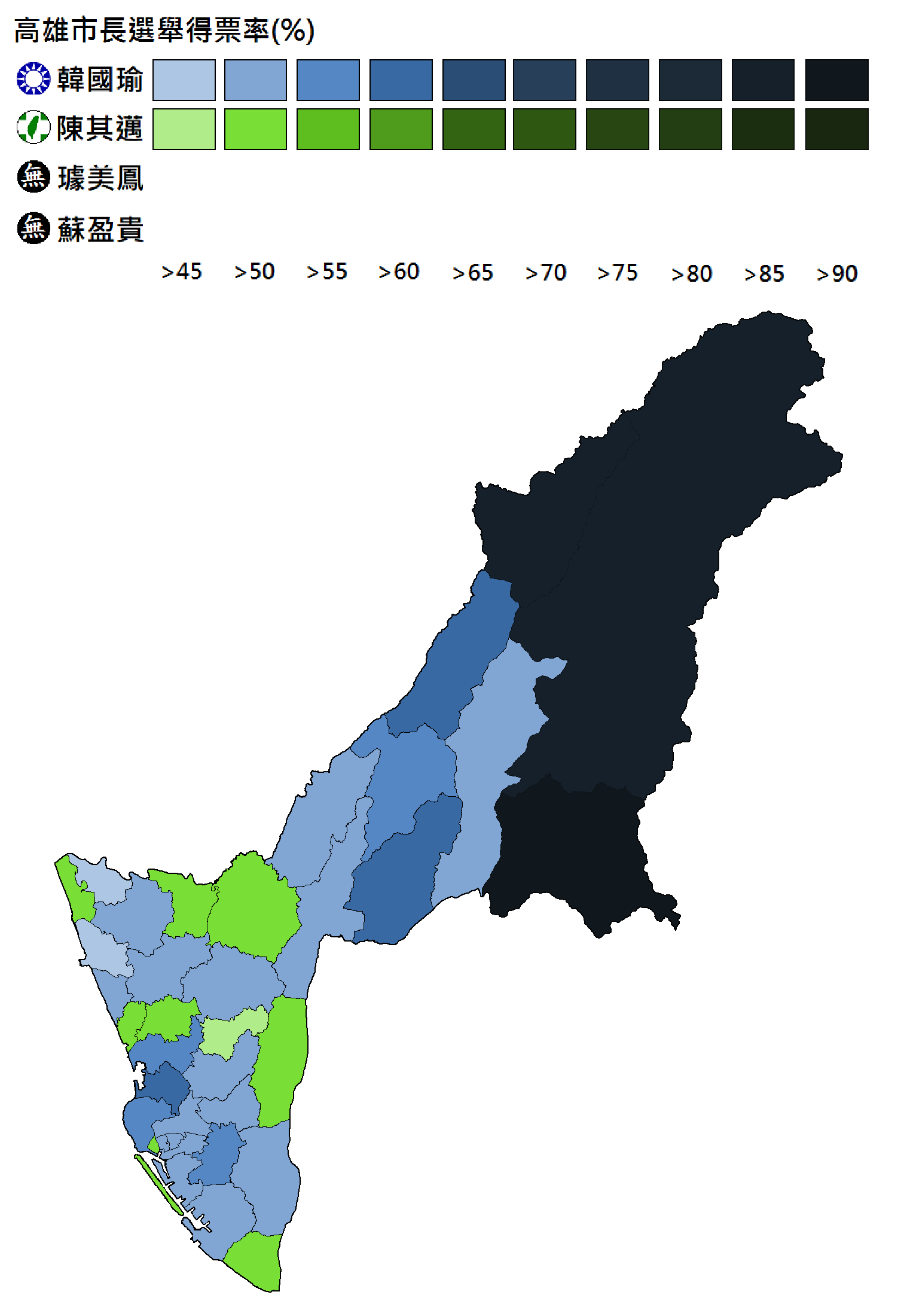
Vote share by district in the 2018 Kaohsiung mayoral election

In May 2018, Han, then director of the KMT's Kaohsiung chapter, won the party's primary for the Kaohsiung mayoralty over KMT legislator Chen Yi-min. His opponent in the general election was Chen Chi-mai of the Democratic Progressive Party (DPP), a five-term legislator, in a city that had been run by DPP mayors since 1998.

Han had few ties to Kaohsiung, and moved his household registration to the city's Linyuan District in April 2018. During the campaign, he described Kaohsiung as "old and poor" and pledged to bring home young people from the city who had left to work in the north. Some of his proposals, including a "Love Ferris wheel" and drilling for oil around Taiping Island, drew criticism. However, his popularity soared within months during the campaign period. His sudden surge in popularity was called the "Han Wave".

On 24 November 2018, Han won the election with 892,545 votes, defeating Chen. He became Kaohsiung's first KMT mayor in 20 years, ending the DPP's 20-year governance of the city. Chen conceded at about 8:50 p.m. In his victory speech, Han called on residents to work together for the city's future regardless of whether they belonged to the pan-green or pan-blue camp. KMT deputy director-general Hung Mong-kai said that the "Han tide" had spread to other cities and counties and helped the party win races that had been expected to be close, such as those in Yunlin County and Taichung.

== Mayor of Kaohsiung (2018–2020) ==
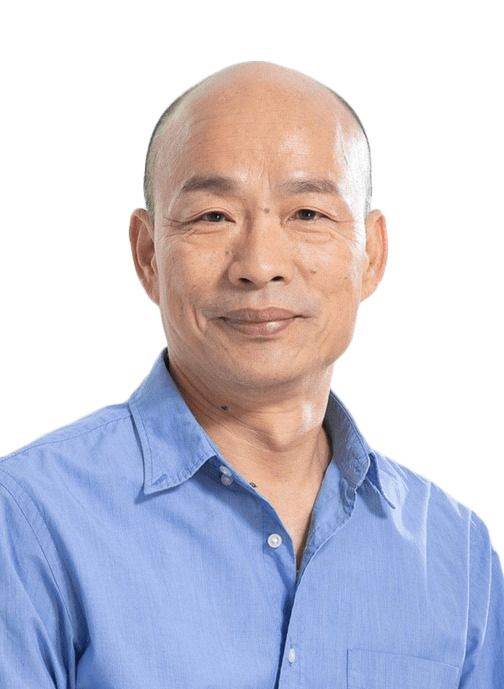
Official portrait as mayor, 2018

On 3 December 2018, Han announced that former transportation and communications minister Yeh Kuang-shih would be one of his deputy mayors. New Taipei City deputy mayor Lee Shu-chuan was later announced as his second deputy mayor.

Han was inaugurated on 25 December 2018 at a ceremony on the east bank of the Love River. In his address, he said that his priorities included boosting sales of Kaohsiung products, attracting money and people to the city, and paying off the city's debt of NT$300 billion. He also pledged to introduce bilingual education.

=== Overseas visits ===
In March 2019, Han made an eight-day trip to Hong Kong, Macau, Shenzhen and Xiamen. During the trip, he held a dinner meeting with Wang Zhimin, the director of Beijing's liaison office in Hong Kong. Han said that the aim of his trip was to promote agricultural exports. He later met Macau Chief Executive Fernando Chui and Fu Ziying, the director of the liaison office in Macau. In Xiamen, Han met Taiwan Affairs Office director Liu Jieyi, and both expressed support for the "1992 consensus". The Hong Kong newspaper Sing Pao Daily News reported that the deals Han negotiated to sell NT$5.2 billion of agricultural products to cities in southern China had been arranged through Chinese state-owned enterprises and were under Beijing's direct control.

In April 2019, Han made a ten-day trip to the United States, during which he spoke at Harvard University and Stanford University.

=== Recall ===
After Han declared his presidential bid in the 2020 presidential election, the civic group Wecare Kaohsiung said that he had broken promises to Kaohsiung residents, so the group began planning a recall election. Wecare Kaohsiung, Citizen Mowing Action and the Taiwan Statebuilding Party launched the signature drive for the first-stage recall proposal on 27 June 2019. The proposal was submitted to the Central Election Commission (CEC) on 26 December 2019, after Han had completed one year in office. On 17 January 2020, the CEC said that the petition had passed the first step with 28,560 valid signatures, above the required minimum of 22,814.

On 7 April 2020, the Kaohsiung City Election Commission approved the second-stage petition with 377,662 valid signatures, exceeding the threshold of 228,134. The CEC then announced that the recall vote would be held on 6 June. For the recall to pass, the votes in favor had to outnumber the votes against and amount to at least 25 percent of eligible voters. Han argued that the petitioners had violated law—specifically the Civil Servants Election and Recall Act—by collecting signatures before he had served one year in office. The Taipei High Court ruled against Han on 17 April, and the Supreme Administrative Court (最高行政法院) ruled against him on appeal on 7 May. A further challenge was rejected by the Taipei High Administrative Court later in May.

In the vote on 6 June 2020, 939,090 ballots were cast in favor of the recall and 25,051 against, with a turnout of 42.14 percent. The result made Han the first head of a special municipality in Taiwan to be recalled from office. The CEC announced the result of the recall vote on 12 June and set the mayoral by-election for 15 August. With Han removed from office, the Executive Yuan named Yang Ming-jou, a counselor in the city government, as acting mayor. Chen Chi-mai won the by-election to serve the remainder of Han's term, which ran until 24 December 2022.

== 2020 presidential campaign ==
Soon after Han took office as mayor, support for Han as a candidate for the 2020 Taiwan presidential election began to build. Han initially refused calls for him to contest the election, and later stated that he would not participate in the 2019 Kuomintang presidential primary. A week after that statement, Han said that he would abide by Kuomintang's primary process, opening the door for his potential nomination as a presidential candidate. On 5 June 2019, Han announced that he would stand in the Kuomintang presidential primary. Han registered for the primary three days after his announcement. Han scheduled five rallies for the primary, with the last one held on 8 July in Hsinchu City. On 15 July, he won the Kuomintang presidential primary and was formally nominated as the Kuomintang presidential candidate on 28 July 2019.

Han held a presidential election rally on 8 September 2019 at Xingfu Shuiyang Park (Chinese:幸福水漾公園) in Sanchong District, New Taipei, with former president Ma Ying-jeou and KMT chairperson Wu Den-yih in attendance. Han conveyed four main points of his campaign platform, which were to defend the Republic of China, to love Chinese culture, to uphold freedom and democracy and to never forget the struggling people. He began a three-month leave of absence despite having serving only six months of his term to focus on his presidential campaign, delegating mayoral duties to Yeh Kuang-shih from 15 October 2019. Some media outlet dubbed Han the "Taiwanese Trump" for his outspoken attitude and similar conservative political positions to American president Donald Trump. On 11 November 2019, Han officially picked former premier Chang San-cheng as his running mate for the election. The Kuomintang ticket completed registration for the election on 18 November 2019. Han and Chang finished second in the presidential election to incumbent president Tsai Ing-wen and her running mate William Lai.

== President of the Legislative Yuan ==
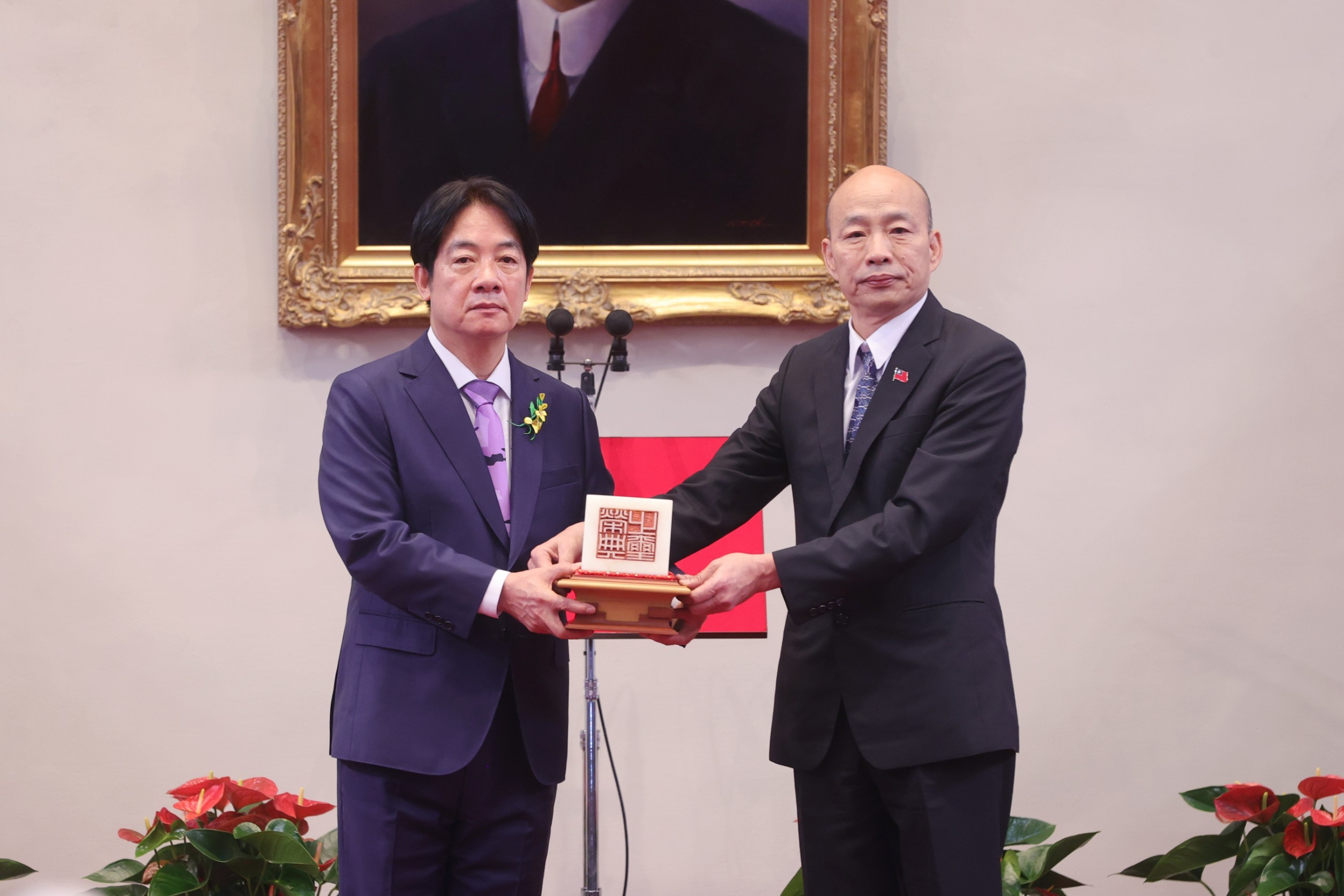
Han presenting the Seal of Honour to Lai Ching-te during his presidential inauguration

In November 2023, Han was ranked first on the Kuomintang's proportional representation party list for the 2024 legislative election. Weeks before taking office in the 11th Legislative Yuan, Han declared interest in contesting the speakership. Han won the Yuan President election with 54 votes.

== Public image ==
=== Philanthropy ===
Han is an active participant in philanthropy. After his unsuccessful presidential bid in 2020, Han donated NT$6 million of campaign funds to charity organizations, including NT$1 million to his running mate’s foundation. Following his recall as Kaohsiung mayor, he appeared at a meet-and-greet announce his appointment as president of the Dianliang Foundation and to promote his new book, which aims to improve bilingual education in elementary schools and provide support to elderly citizens. The foundation was commended by the ROC Veteran Affairs Council for its services provided to ROCAF veterans.

=== Violent incidents and alleged ties to organized crime ===
Han committed several violent acts in his tenure as Taipei County councillor and then Legislative Yuan member. On 16 November 1990, during then-Taipei County magistrate You Ching's presentation, Han threw a thermos at You then ran toward the podium and attempted to choke him. In 1993, Han assaulted Democratic Progressive Party legislator and future president Chen Shui-bian, leaving Chen hospitalized for three days. Han later apologized for the violent act.

In 1993, following a shooting at a gang leader’s funeral, Han accompanied a gang member who claimed to turn himself in to a police station. Investigators found that the gang member was taking the blame for someone else and obstructing justice. Han denied he had any culpability in the case.

Days leading up to the 2020 election to recall Han as Kaohsiung mayor, National Police Agency director-general Chen Chia-chin stated that there were rumors that gang members were expected to be at voting stations to intimidate and suppress voters. The Kaohsiung Police confirmed there was information about the alleged voter suppression. However, Chen, in a separate press conference, noted that the alleged involvement with organized crime was not substantiated by evidence and was a rumor. In response, Han suggested that the National Police Agency form an investigative task force. No evidence suggesting Han's involvement were reported following the recall.

== Personal life ==
Han married his wife, Lee Chia-fen, in 1989. They have three children. In January 2022, Han published a collection of short stories and established the Light Up Foundation, a charity.

== See also ==
- Han fans
- Taiwan Foundation for Democracy

== Notes ==
Political offices
Preceded by Hsu Li-ming as Acting mayor	Mayor of Kaohsiung; 2018–2020	Succeeded by Yang Ming-jou as Acting mayor
Preceded by You Si-kun	President of the Legislative Yuan; 2024–present	Incumbent
Party political offices
Preceded by Eric Chu	Kuomintang nominee for President of the Republic of China; 2020	Succeeded by Hou Yu-ih
