= Mayor of Kaohsiung =

Head of government of Kaohsiung, Taiwan

Mayor of the City of Kaohsiung
- Seal of Kaohsiung

- Flag of Kaohsiung

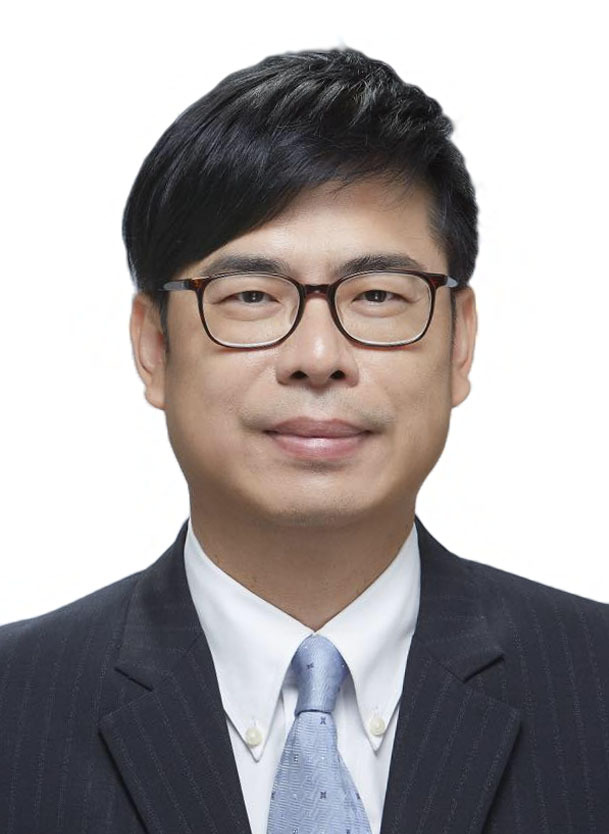
- Incumbent; Chen Chi-mai since 24 August 2020
- Term length: four years; may serve 1 consecutive terms

The Mayor of Kaohsiung is the head of the Kaohsiung City Government, Taiwan and is elected to a four-year term. The current mayor is Chen Chi-mai who took office since 24 August 2020.

== Titles ==
Date	English	Characters	Japanese	Mandarin	Taiwanese	Hakka
Dec 1924–Oct 1940	Mayor of Takao	高雄市市尹	Takao-shi Shiin		Ko-hiông-chhī Chhī-ún	Kô-hiùng-sṳ Sṳ-yún
Oct 1940–Oct 1945	Mayor of Takao	高雄市市長	Takao-shi Shichō		Ko-hiông-chhī; Chhī-tiúⁿ	Kô-hiùng-sṳ; Sṳ-chhòng
Oct 1945–present	Mayor of Kaohsiung	高雄市市長		Gāoxióng Shì Shìzhǎng	Ko-hiông-chhī; Chhī-tiúⁿ	Kô-hiùng-sṳ; Sṳ-chhòng

== List of mayors ==
Empire of Japan Kuomintang China Democratic Socialist Party Democratic Progressive Party

=== Prefectural city era (appointed mayors) ===
During this era, Kaohsiung was called "Takao" (高雄; たかお). All of the mayors were appointed by the Empire of Japan.

No.	Portrait	Name (Birth–Death)	Term of Office	
1		Tasuke Iwamoto 岩本多助 (?–?)	25 December 1924	6 August 1927
2		Genjurō Saitō 齋藤玄壽郎 (?–?)	6 August 1927	22 April 1929
3		Masaharu Imai 今井昌治 (1884–?)	22 April 1929	21 April 1932
4		Gisaburō Kobayashi 小林儀三郎 (?–?)	21 April 1932	3 September 1934
5		Shigeharu Matsuo 松尾繁治 (1886–1944)	3 September 1934	30 November 1937
6		Tairiku Munetō 宗藤大陸 (?–?)	30 November 1937	31 January 1941
7		Takeshi Kojima 小島猛 (?–?)	31 January 1941	January 1943
8		Takeo Yokoyama 橫山竹雄 (1895–?)	January 1943	March 1944
9		Otohiko Nakamatsu 中松乙彥 (?–?)	March 1944	October 1945

=== Provincial city era (appointed mayors) ===
No.	Portrait	Name (Birth–Death)	Term of Office		Political Party
1		Lien Mou 連謀 (1907–1978)	8 November 1945	23 May 1946	Kuomintang
2		Huang Chung-tu 黃仲圖 (1902–1988)	23 May 1946	2 August 1947	Kuomintang
3		Huang Chiang 黃強 (1887–1974)	2 August 1947	1 May 1949	Kuomintang
4		Liou Hsiang 劉翔 ( – )	1 May 1949	2 August 1950	Kuomintang
5		Chen Pau-tai 陳保泰 ( – )	2 August 1950	1 May 1951	Kuomintang

=== Provincial city era (directly elected mayors) ===
No.	Portrait	Name (Birth–Death)	Term of Office		Term	Political Party
6		Hsieh Cheng-chiang 謝掙強 (1915–1979)	1 May 1951	2 June 1954	1	Kuomintang
6		Hsieh Cheng-chiang 謝掙強 (1915–1979)	2 June 1954	2 June 1957	2	Kuomintang
7		Chen Wu-chang 陳武璋 (1915–1984)	2 June 1957	2 June 1960	3	Kuomintang
8		Chen Chi-chuan 陳啟川 (1899–1993)	2 June 1960	2 June 1964	4	Kuomintang
8		Chen Chi-chuan 陳啟川 (1899–1993)	2 June 1964	2 June 1968	5	Kuomintang
9		Yang Chin-hu 楊金虎 (1898–1990)	2 June 1968	1 February 1973	6	China Democratic Socialist Party
10		Wang Yu-yun 王玉雲 (1925–2009)	1 February 1973	20 December 1977	7	Kuomintang
10		Wang Yu-yun 王玉雲 (1925–2009)	20 December 1977	1 July 1979	8	Kuomintang

=== Special municipality era (appointed mayors) ===
No.	Portrait	Name (Birth–Death)	Term of Office		Political Party
1		Wang Yu-yun 王玉雲 (1925–2009)	1 July 1979	21 June 1981	Kuomintang
2		Yang Chin-tsung 楊金欉 (1923–1990)	21 June 1981	19 April 1982	Kuomintang
3		Hsu Shui-teh 許水德 (1931–2021)	19 April 1982	30 May 1985	Kuomintang
4		Su Nan-cheng 蘇南成 (1936–2014)	30 May 1985	18 June 1990	Kuomintang
5		Wu Den-yih 吳敦義 (1948–)	18 June 1990	25 December 1994	Kuomintang

=== Special municipality era (directly elected mayors) ===
No.	Portrait	Name (Birth–Death)	Term of Office		Term	Political Party
6		Wu Den-yih 吳敦義 (1948–)	25 December 1994	25 December 1998	1	Kuomintang
7		Frank Hsieh 謝長廷 (1946–)	25 December 1998	25 December 2002	2	Democratic Progressive Party
7		Frank Hsieh 謝長廷 (1946–)	25 December 2002	1 February 2005	3	Democratic Progressive Party
—		Chen Chi-mai 陳其邁 (1964–)	1 February 2005	20 December 2005	3	Democratic Progressive Party
—		Yeh Chu-lan 葉菊蘭 (1949–)	20 December 2005	25 December 2006	3	Democratic Progressive Party
8		Chen Chu 陳菊 (1950–)	25 December 2006	25 December 2010	4	Democratic Progressive Party

=== Special municipality era (consolidated Kaohsiung) ===
No.	Portrait	Name (Birth–Death)	Term of Office		Term	Political Party
1		Chen Chu 陳菊 (1950–)	25 December 2010	25 December 2014	1	Democratic Progressive Party
1		Chen Chu 陳菊 (1950–)	25 December 2014	20 April 2018	2	Democratic Progressive Party
—		Hsu Li-ming 許立明 (1969–)	20 April 2018	25 December 2018	2	Democratic Progressive Party
2		Han Kuo-yu 韓國瑜 (1957–)	25 December 2018	12 June 2020 (Note: Recalled.)	3 (Note: From 16 October 2019 to 11 January, Han Kuo-yu was on leave to run in the 2020 presidential election. During that period of time, deputy mayor Yeh Kuang-shih acted as mayor.)	Kuomintang
—		Yang Ming-jou 楊明州 (1956–)	13 June 2020	23 August 2020	3	Independent
3		Chen Chi-mai 陳其邁 (1964–)	24 August 2020	25 December 2022	3	Democratic Progressive Party
3		Chen Chi-mai 陳其邁 (1964–)	25 December 2022	Incumbent	4	Democratic Progressive Party

== See also ==
- Kaohsiung City Government
- Kaohsiung City Council
- Kaohsiung City
- List of county magistrates of Kaohsiung
