= 2020 Kaohsiung mayoral recall vote =

Recall election in Taiwan

- 6 June 2020
- Popular vote on recalling incumbent mayor of Kaohsiung, Han Kuo-yu
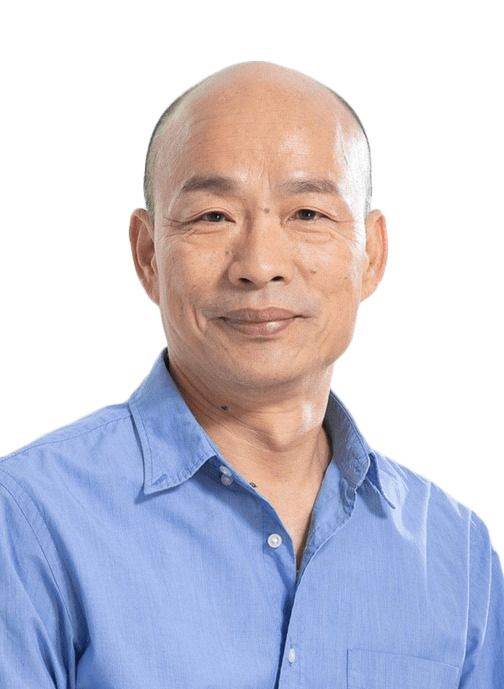
- Voting system: Mayor is recalled if votes for the recall outnumber those against and exceed one quarter of eligible voters (574,996)
- Outcome: Adopted

Results
Choice	Votes	%
Yes	939,090	97.40%
No	25,051	2.60%
Valid votes	964,141	99.47%
Invalid or blank votes	5,118	0.53%
Total votes	969,259	100.00%
Registered voters/turnout	2,299,981	42.14%
- Agree votes below 25%, diff > 9,700 Agree votes below 25%, diff > 2,400 Agree votes below 25%, diff < 2,400 Agree votes above 25%, diff < 2,400 Agree votes above 25%, diff > 2,400 Agree votes above 25%, diff > 9,700

The 2020 Kaohsiung mayoral recall vote (Chinese: 高雄市第三屆市長韓國瑜罷免案) was a recall election held on 6 June 2020 to recall the incumbent mayor of Kaohsiung, Han Kuo-yu. The recall was successful, as the number of agree votes (939,090) outnumbered disagree votes and exceeded the minimum requirement of 574,996. An acting mayor was appointed by the Executive Yuan and held office until 24 August 2020, nine days after a by-election was held.

The vote is the largest-scale recall vote in Taiwan in terms of electorate, and is the first ever successful recall of a Taiwanese mayor or magistrate.

== Background ==
Han Kuo-yu was elected mayor of Kaohsiung City in the 24 November 2018 local election. However, his popularity quickly dwindled after he began campaigning for the 2020 Taiwanese presidential election, leading to a recall proposal on 26 December 2019. On 17 January 2020, a petition to recall Han cleared the first threshold with 28,560 signatures, exceeding the required 1% of the electorate (22,814 signatures). On 7 April, the city's electoral commission verified that 377,662 of approximately 406,000 signatures collected in the second phase of the recall petition were valid, clearing the threshold of 10% of the electorate. The Central Election Commission certified the validity of collected signatures on 17 April, and scheduled a recall vote on 6 June 2020.

Han contested the legality of the recall in court, claiming that petitioners had been collecting signatures before he had served a full year as mayor, in violation of Article 75 of the Civil Servants and Election and Recall Act. The motion was denied by the Taipei Administrative High Court on 17 April 2020. An appeal to the Taiwan Supreme Administrative Court was rejected on 7 May 2020. Han claimed that the recall vote would damage his reputation, interfere with his mayoral duties, burden other city officials, and delay municipal work programs. The Taipei High Administrative Court ruled against these arguments on 22 May.

== Voting system ==
Residents of Kaohsiung City registered in the city continuously since 6 February 2020 and aged 20 or above on the day prior to the vote are eligible. The mayor is recalled if votes in favour of the recall outnumber those against and exceed one quarter of voters in the original electoral district (574,996).

== Procedures and timetable ==
The Central Election Commission stated on 2 May 2020 that the 1,823 polling sites used in the 2018 mayoral election would be set up for the recall vote. The CEC released a statement by Han on 5 May, in which he emphasised the economic investment drawn to Kaohsiung during his mayoral administration. Polls were open from 08:00 to 16:00 on 6 June.

== Opinion polling ==
View source data.

Date	Pollster	Sample size	% turn out (Note: Responses indicating "likely turnout" are not included)	% turn out and vote agree	% in favour of recall	% against recall	% other
2020-06-06	Result	2,299,981	42.1	40.8	—N/a	—N/a	—N/a
2020-05-24	INA News	1,080	45.5	41.9	57.3	30.0	12.7
2020-05-23	Apple Daily	1,079	39.0	36.0	50.1	22.0	27.9
2020-05-20	TVBS	1,237	39.0	34.3	45.0	—N/a	—N/a
2020-05-21	TPOF	1,085	47.9	35.0	56.3	28.2	11.2
2020-05-19	New Power Party	830	46.4	35.6	56.4	28.9	14.7
2020-05-19	Statebuilding Party	1,072	34.5	31.9	54.4	26.5	19.0
2020-05-08	Apple Daily	1,082	50.2	37.3	65.0	20.4	14.6
2020-05-05	INA News	1,090	47.5	36.0	55.1	32.0	12.9
2020-04-20	New Power Party	805	43.6	33.0	52.1	35.2	12.7
2020-03-20	Taiwan Brain Trust	1,087	51.2	39.5	59.5	34.5	6.0
2020-02-07	TVBS	1,213	44.0	34.8	53.0	32.0	16.0
2020-01-16	ETtoday	1,768	—N/a	—N/a	63.4	33.2	3.4
2020-01-14	TVBS	1,030	—N/a	—N/a	53.0	32.0	15.0
2020-01-14	TISR	1,072	65.1	58.2	58.5	29.8	11.7

== Results ==
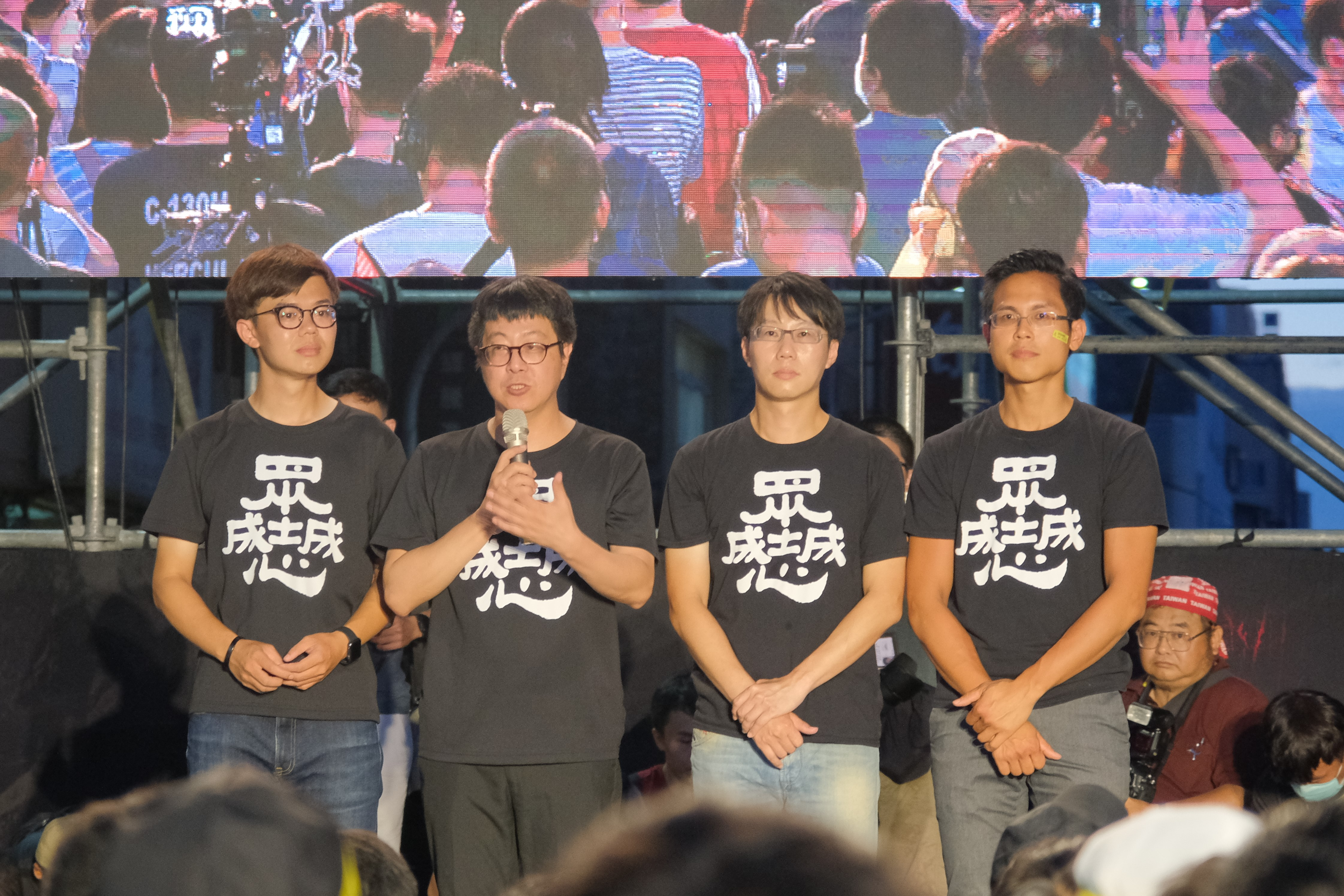
Leaders of the recall initiative speaking to supporters after results are confirmed; left to right: Chang Po-yang, Aaron Yin, Chen Kuan-jung, Lee Yi-chieh

The motion to recall Han garnered 939,090 votes favouring recall and 25,051 votes against recall. Agree votes accounted for 40.83% of eligible voters, exceeding the 25% minimum electoral threshold to pass it. Han conceded the vote shortly after polls closed. Kuomintang chairman Johnny Chiang stated that he accepted the outcome of the recall vote, and apologized to city residents for the party's shortcomings. The New Power Party said that the recall vote was a "victory for Taiwan’s democracy." The Taiwan People's Party commented that "the recall process — from the petition to the outcome of the vote — has written a new page in the history of the autonomy of regional politics in Taiwan." Approximately five hundred supporters of Han from around Taiwan gathered in Taipei on 13 June to protest his recall and the policies of the Tsai Ing-wen presidential administration.

Former counselor to the Kaohsiung City Government Yang Ming-jou was appointed interim mayor on 13 June by the Secretary-General of the Executive Yuan, Li Meng-yen. A by-election for a new full-term mayor was held on 15 August, which was won by Chen Chi-mai.

2020 Kaohsiung mayoral recall
	Count	%	% electorate
Electorate	2,299,981	100.00	
Threshold	574,996	25.00	
Agree votes	939,090	97.40	40.83
Disagree votes	25,051	2.60	1.09
Valid votes	964,141	99.47	41.92
Invalid votes	5,118	0.53	0.22
Total votes	969,259	100.00	42.14
Outcome	Adopted		

2020 Kaohsiung mayoral recall vote district breakdown
District	Electorate	Agree votes	% electorate	Diff from 25% electorate	Disagree votes	Diff from agree votes	% valid votes	Valid votes	Invalid votes	Total votes	Turnout (%)
Yancheng	21,094	9,107	43.17	+3,833	221	-8,886	2.37	9,328	57	9,385	44.49
Gushan	113,422	44,512	39.24	+16,156	1,008	-43,504	2.21	45,520	190	45,710	40.30
Zuoying	158,116	57,508	36.37	+17,979	1,416	-56,092	2.40	58,924	271	59,195	37.44
Nanzih	151,524	61,389	40.51	+23,508	1,623	-59,766	2.58	63,012	283	63,295	41.77
Sanmin	281,281	120,311	42.77	+49,990	2,889	-117,422	2.34	123,200	567	123,767	44.00
Sinsing	43,397	17,452	40.21	+6,603	443	-17,009	2.48	17,895	96	17,991	41.46
Cianjin	23,704	9,437	39.81	+3,511	252	-9,185	2.60	9,689	47	9,736	41.07
Lingya	142,733	57,069	39.98	+21,386	1,421	-55,648	2.43	58,490	295	58,785	41.19
Cianjhen	157,294	66,816	42.48	+27,492	1,779	-65,037	2.59	68,595	347	68,942	43.83
Cijin	23,954	10,658	44.49	+4,669	295	-10,363	2.69	10,953	58	11,011	45.97
Siaogang	129,597	55,361	42.72	+22,962	1,415	-53,946	2.49	56,776	259	57,035	44.01
Fongshan	294,083	117,795	40.06	+44,274	3,062	-114,733	2.53	120,857	617	121,474	41.31
Linyuan	57,617	25,028	43.44	+10,624	684	-24,344	2.66	25,712	194	25,906	44.96
Daliao	94,987	39,474	41.56	+15,727	1,029	-38,445	2.54	40,503	222	40,725	42.87
Dashu	35,719	15,318	42.88	+6,388	389	-14,929	2.48	15,707	89	15,796	44.22
Dashe	29,282	13,320	45.49	+5,999	363	-12,957	2.65	13,683	89	13,772	47.03
Renwu	73,973	32,787	44.32	+14,294	886	-31,901	2.63	33,673	168	33,841	45.75
Niaosong	38,963	16,662	42.76	+6,921	412	-16,250	2.41	17,074	91	17,165	44.05
Gangshan	79,113	32,084	40.55	+12,306	895	-31,189	2.71	32,979	190	33,169	41.93
Ciaotou	32,578	16,254	49.89	+8,109	507	-15,747	3.02	16,761	95	16,856	51.74
Yanchao	25,354	10,618	41.88	+4,279	306	-10,312	2.80	10,924	91	11,015	43.44
Tianliao	6,425	2,552	39.72	+946	92	-2,460	3.48	2,644	21	2,665	41.48
Alian	23,841	10,559	44.29	+4,599	281	-10,278	2.60	10,840	70	10,910	45.76
Lujhu	42,432	18,054	42.55	+7,446	568	-17,486	3.05	18,622	111	18,733	44.15
Hunei	25,097	10,929	43.55	+4,655	369	-10,560	3.27	11,298	75	11,373	45.32
Qieding	25,515	10,600	41.54	+4,221	315	-10,285	2.89	10,915	59	10,974	43.01
Yong'an	11,699	4,914	42.00	+1,989	122	-4,792	2.42	5,036	23	5,059	43.24
Mituo	15,918	6,173	38.78	+2,193	193	-5,980	3.03	6,366	48	6,414	40.29
Zihguan	30,272	14,032	46.35	+6,464	404	-13,628	2.80	14,436	87	14,523	47.98
Cishan	30,807	11,399	37.00	+3,697	474	-10,925	3.99	11,873	78	11,951	38.79
Meinong	34,112	9,749	28.58	+1,221	420	-9,329	4.13	10,169	88	10,257	30.07
Liouguei	10,903	2,880	26.41	+154	164	-2,716	5.39	3,044	40	3,084	28.29
Jiasian	5,224	1,223	23.41	-83	56	-1,167	4.38	1,279	16	1,295	24.79
Shanlin	10,238	2,733	26.69	+173	121	-2,612	4.24	2,854	28	2,882	28.15
Neimen	12,517	3,863	30.86	+734	145	-3,718	3.61	4,008	56	4,064	32.47
Maolin	1,520	60	3.95	-320	1	-59	1.64	61	0	61	4.01
Taoyuan	3,342	201	6.01	-635	24	-177	10.67	225	2	227	6.79
Namasia	2,334	209	8.95	-375	7	-202	3.24	216	0	216	9.25
