= Chen Chi-mai =

Taiwanese politician, physician, and mayor of Kaohsiung

- 陳其邁
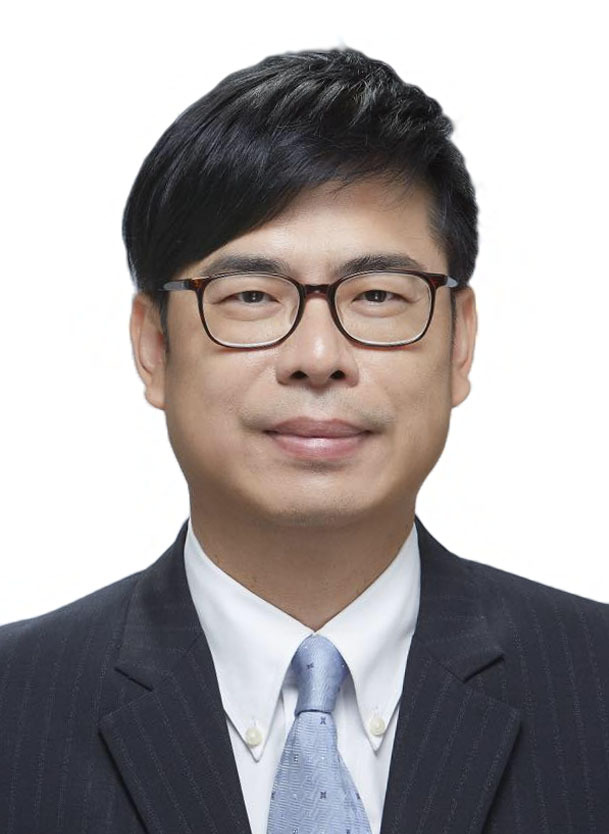
- Official portrait, 2019

3rd Mayor of Kaohsiung
- Incumbent
- Assumed office 24 August 2020
- Preceded by: Yang Ming-jou (a.i.)
- Acting; 1 February 2005 – 26 September 2005
- Preceded by: Frank Hsieh
- Succeeded by: Yeh Chu-lan (a.i.)

37th Vice Premier of Taiwan
- In office 14 January 2019 – 19 June 2020
- Prime Minister: Su Tseng-chang
- Preceded by: Shih Jun-ji
- Succeeded by: Shen Jong-chin

Chair of the Democratic Progressive Party
- Acting; 30 November 2022 – 18 January 2023
- Preceded by: Tsai Ing-wen
- Succeeded by: Lai Ching-te
Additional offices
Deputy Secretary-General to the President
In office 9 February 2007 – 20 May 2008; Serving with Lin Chia-lung
President	Chen Shui-bian
Secretary General	Yeh Chu-lan; Mark Chen
Preceded by	Liu Shih-fang
Succeeded by	Yeh Ching-chuan
Minister without Portfolio Spokesperson of the Executive Yuan
In office 20 May 2004 – 1 February 2005
Prime Minister	Yu Shyi-kun
Preceded by	Lin Chia-lung
Succeeded by	Cho Jung-tai

Member of the Legislative Yuan
- In office 1 February 2012 – 3 November 2018
- Succeeded by: Chen Ching-min
- Constituency: Party-list (Democratic Progressive Party)
- In office 1 February 1996 – 19 May 2004
- Constituency: Kaohsiung City II (1996-2000); Kaohsiung City I (2000-2004)

Personal details
- Born: December 23, 1964 (age 61) Keelung, Taiwan
- Party: Democratic Progressive Party
- Parent: Chen Che-nan (father)
- Education: Chung Shan Medical University (MB); National Taiwan University (MS)
- Occupation: Politician; physician

Chen Chi-mai (Chinese: 陳其邁; pinyin: Chén Qímài; Wade–Giles: Ch'ên^{2} Ch'i^{2}-mai^{4}; Pe̍h-ōe-jī: Tân Kî-māi; born December 23, 1964), also known as Comay Chen, is a Taiwanese politician and physician who has served as the 3rd mayor of Kaohsiung since 2020. He has previously served as the spokesperson of the Democratic Progressive Party (DPP).

A physician from Keelung, Chen began his political career as a member of the Legislative Yuan. He served as legislator for almost eight years before becoming the spokesperson of the Executive Yuan. In 2005, Chen became acting mayor of Kaohsiung after Frank Hsieh's appointment as premier. Chen became the deputy secretary-general of the Presidential Office in 2007 and served until the inauguration of President Ma Ying-jeou. Following his December 2018 loss in the Kaohsiung mayoral election, Chen was appointed Vice Premier of the Republic of China by President Tsai Ing-wen. Chen yielded the vice premiership to Shen Jong-chin in June 2020, and won the Kaohsiung mayoralty in a by-election on August 15, 2020 after former mayor Han Kuo-yu was recalled.

== Early life and education ==
Chen Chi-mai was born in Keelung City, Taiwan, on December 23, 1964. He is the son of Chen Che-nan, who is also a politician and was also a deputy secretary-general of the Presidential Office before Chen took office in 2007.

Chen studied medicine at Chung Shan Medical University in Taichung, where he earned his Bachelor of Medicine (M.B.) in 1991. He then earned a Master of Science (M.S.) degree in preventive medicine from National Taiwan University in 1994 and worked as a lecturer at Taipei Medical University and a visiting scholar at the London School of Economics. He practiced medicine at the Chang Gung Memorial Hospital for about three years and became a lecturer at Taipei Medical University in 1996.

Chen made his early entry into public affairs when he, as a student, served as an assistant to his father, a legislator at the time.

== Rise in politics ==
A member of the Democratic Progressive Party (DPP), Chen was elected legislator three times serving from 1996 to 2004. During his term, he became the secretary-general of the Justice Alliance faction of the DPP in 1998 and the legislative caucus leader in 1999. He also became members of various committees within the Legislative Yuan, including the Foreign Affairs, Judiciary, National Defense, and Transportation Committees.

Before the DPP became the ruling party, Chen suggested that then-incumbent magistrate of Taoyuan County Annette Lu would be a better choice for Chen Shui-bian's presidential running mate than any other party member. Lu was eventually selected as his running mate.

After Shui-bian's successful presidential campaign, Chen Chi-mai, as a leader of the Justice Alliance faction, supported the proposal of another member to revise the pro-independence guideline. Although many party members had similar views, the proposal was sent back to the party's policy research department for review.

In 2004, Chen was appointed a Minister without Portfolio and spokesperson of the Executive Yuan. Soon after, another proposal to modify pro-independence guidelines was created. Several DPP legislators believed that the change of the national title from "Republic of China" to "Taiwan," which is one of the ultimate goals of Taiwan's desinicization campaign and localization movement, was not necessary. Chen also supported the proposal. The proposal was documented in an essay called New Culture Discourse, drafted by DPP legislator Lee Wen-chung of the New Tide faction. After the essay was leaked to the media, many politicians, including Chen, denied being involved in drafting the document. The document proved too controversial and was attacked within the party as a result, although some members believed that it was only based on the 1999 Resolution on Taiwan's Future.

In January 2005, following the death of former CCP General Secretary Zhao Ziyang, Chen represented the Taiwanese cabinet in delivering a message to the Chinese government. In his address, Chen urged China's leaders to pursue democratization. Chen stated that Beijing should "face the truth about Tiananmen Square... We urge the Chinese government to learn from Mr. Zhao's tolerance and to push for democratic reforms."

Later in January 2005, Chen Chi-mai was nominated to serve as acting mayor of Kaohsiung by premier-designate Frank Hsieh.

== Mayoralty ==
After becoming the mayor of Kaohsiung, Chen sought to continue construction of the Kaohsiung Mass Rapid Transit (KMRT), a major construction started during Frank Hsieh's mayoral term. Both the Red Line and the Orange Line of the system opened in 2008.

Chen also worked to turn Kaohsiung into a film location hub by encouraging filmmakers to shoot their films in the port city. He offered filmmakers, such as Tsai Ming-liang, various incentives for their award-winning films. He presented a NT$10 million (approx. US$323 thousand) prize to Tsai for his film The Wayward Cloud. Tsai in return said he would soon shoot a new film in Kaohsiung and praised the city's efforts to develop Kaohsiung into an international city.

On July 25, 2005, Kaohsiung officially became the host city of World Games 2009, which became the largest international sports event hosted in Taiwan, after Chen received the flag of the World Games. Chen later announced the construction of a world-class stadium built for the event.

In August 2005, Thai workers rioted over the draconian treatment they received as foreign workers. These workers lived in poor conditions and had limited freedom. The Chen administration vowed to take action on August 25. Chen apologized to the public for the social turmoil caused by the incident and offered to resign three times. Then-premier Frank Hsieh authorized Chen's resignation on September 12, and replaced him with former vice premier Yeh Chu-lan.

== Post-mayoralty ==
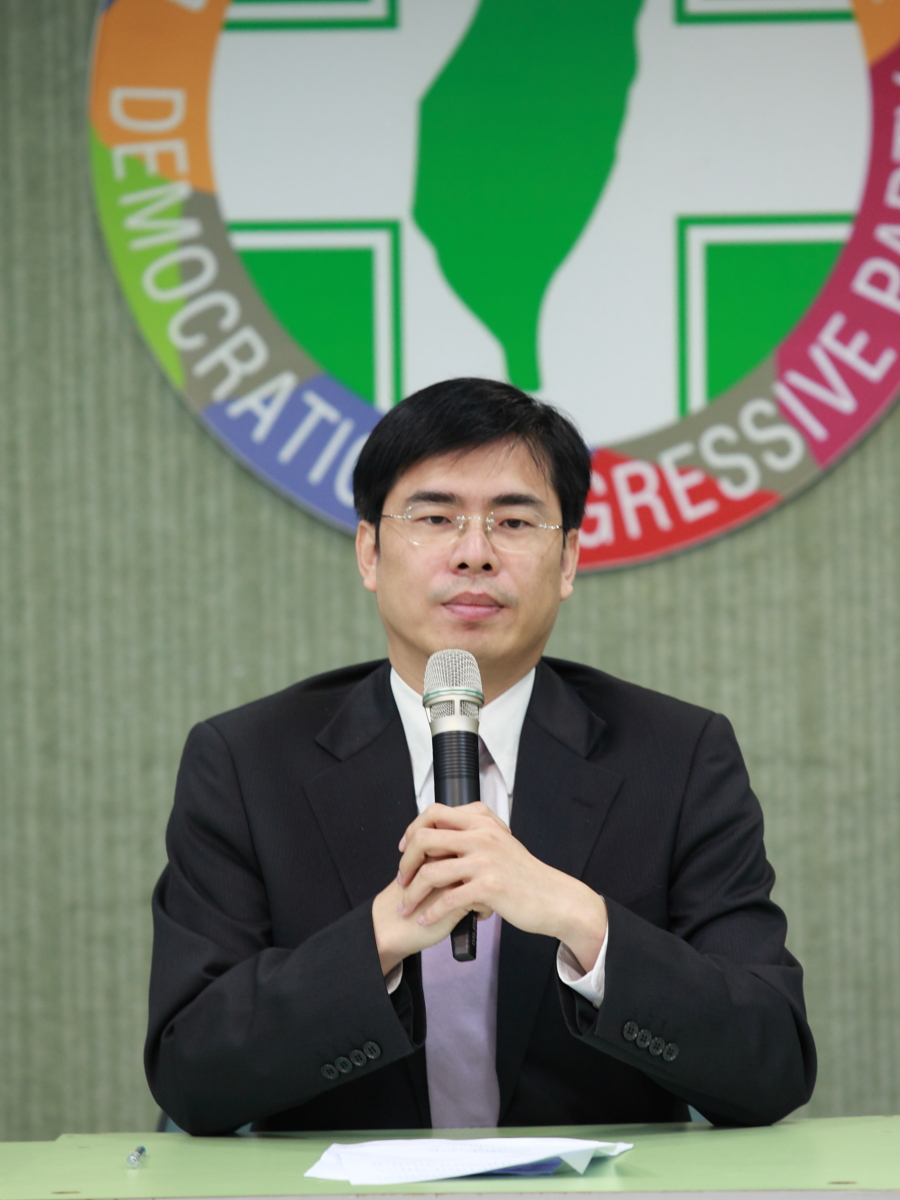
Chen as spokesperson of Tsai Ing-wen's 2012 presidential campaign, 2011

After a temporary period of research at the London School of Economics in England, Chen was appointed the deputy secretary-general of the Presidential Office in February 2007. His appointment drew mixed reactions, with the support from the DPP legislative caucus and opposition from the Kuomintang legislative caucus. Chen served with Lin Chia-lung, former director of the Government Information Office.

After the DPP chairmanship election in May 2008, chairwoman-elect Tsai Ing-wen announced the appointment of Chen as the deputy secretary-general of the party. He held the position with Cho Jung-tai until 2009. Chen is now concurrently serving as both the spokesperson of the Democratic Progressive Party and the chief executive officer of the party's Policy Research and Coordinating Committee since May 2011.

In the 2012 legislative elections, Chen was placed on the DPP electoral list, from which 13 members were elected based on the number of votes the DPP received. Being the eighth member on the list, Chen returned to the Legislative Yuan once again as a legislator in February 2012. He was reelected via proportional representation in 2016. Chen faced fellow lawmakers Chao Tien-lin, Lin Tai-hua, and Kuan Bi-ling in a Kaohsiung mayoral primary held in March 2018, and was named the Democratic Progressive Party candidate for the mayoralty. On November 24, 2018, he was defeated by Han Kuo-yu, the Kuomintang mayoral nominee, by more than 150,000 votes. Chen became the first DPP mayoral candidate to lose in the special municipality of Kaohsiung, established in 2010. His defeat marked the end of 20 years of Democratic Progressive Party governance in the old city area of Kaohsiung, and 33 years of governance in the old Kaohsiung County area.

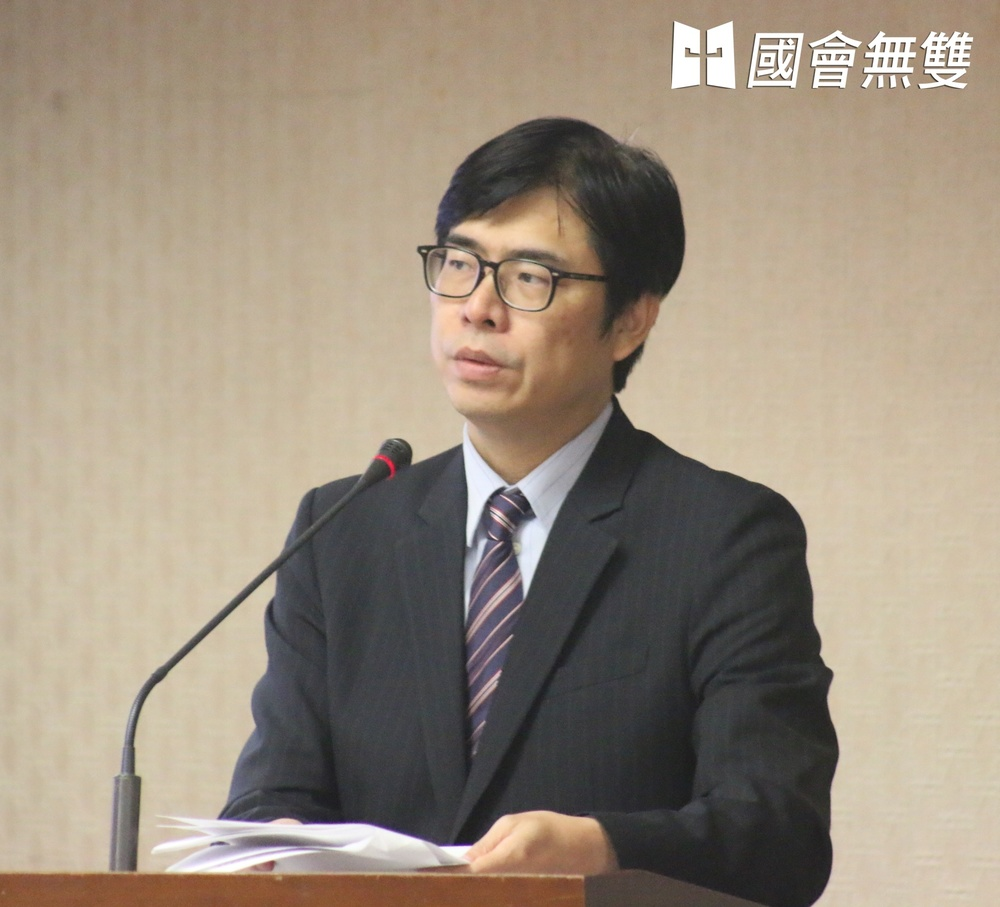
Chen as a legislator of the Legislative Yuan, 2015

2018 Kaohsiung City mayoral results
No.	Candidate	Party	Votes	Percentage
1	Han Kuo-yu	Kuomintang	892,545	53.87%
2	Chen Chi-mai	Democratic Progressive Party	742,239	44.80%
3	Chu Mei-feng	Independent	7,998	0.48%
4	Su Ying-kuei	Independent	14,125	0.85%
Total voters			2,281,338	
Valid votes			1,656,907	
Invalid votes				
Voter turnout			72.63%	

Chen's resignation from the vice premiership took effect on 19 June 2020, as he then represented the DPP as their candidate contesting in the 2020 Kaohsiung mayoral by-election scheduled for 15 August.

== Return to mayoralty ==
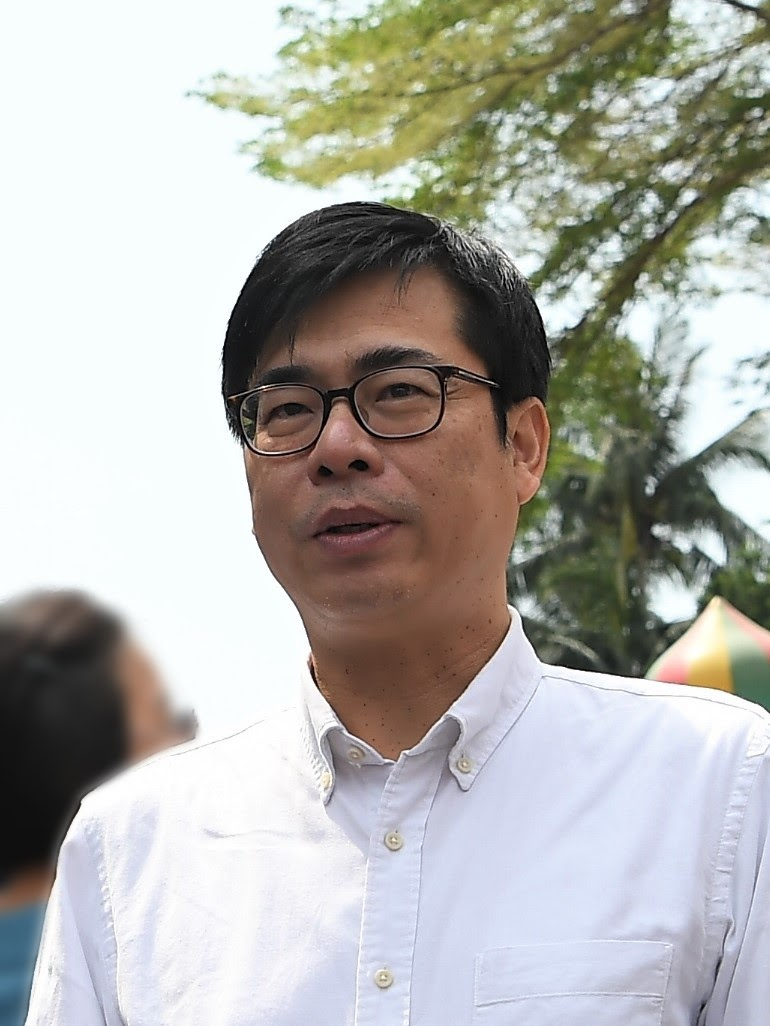
Chen as Vice Premier of the Republic of China, 2019

Following the successful recall attempt against Han Kuo-yu, Chen registered as the candidate representing the Democratic Progressive Party in the 2020 Kaohsiung mayoral by-election on 15 August with many calling on him as the favorite to win. He won by a landslide margin with 70 percent of the votes.

Chen announced on 20 August 2020 that Charles Lin, Shih Che, and Lo Ta-sheng would be joining his administration as deputy mayors, one day before his victory was certified by the Central Election Commission. Chen succeeded acting mayor Yang Ming-jou on 24 August.

2020 Kaohsiung City mayoral by-election results
No.	Candidate	Party	Votes	Percentage
1	Chen Chi-mai	Democratic Progressive Party	671,804	70.03%
2	Li Mei-jhen	Kuomintang	248,478	25.90%
3	Wu Yi-jheng	Taiwan People's Party	38,960	4.06%
Total votes			962,826	
Valid votes			959,242	
Invalid votes			3,584	
Voter turnout			41.83%	

During Chen's second stint as mayor, President Tsai Ing-wen resigned as chairperson of the Democratic Progressive Party to take responsibility for the party's poor performance in the 2022 local elections. On 30 November 2022, Chen assumed the party leadership in an acting capacity.

== Research ==
Chen has a master's degree in public health from National Taiwan University and, referring to COVID-19, has been quoted as saying that Taiwan was "the earliest country to activate epidemic prevention measures against this disease". Chen has proposed using technology including mobile phone data for contact tracing and containment, and is the first author of a paper that describes how passengers of the COVID-19 stricken cruise ship Diamond Princess were traced using mobile phone data, and how their contacts were alerted through text messaging.

== Personal ==
Chen is married to Wu Hong who is also a doctor and has a son and a daughter.

He is a Master Scuba Diver with close to thirty years of experience.

== Notes ==
Political offices
Preceded by Lin Chia-lung	Spokesperson of the Executive Yuan; 2004–2005	Succeeded by Cho Jung-tai
Preceded by Frank Hsieh	Mayor of Kaohsiung (acting); 2005	Succeeded by Yeh Chu-lan
Preceded by Liu Shyh-fang	Deputy Secretary-General of the Pres. Office; 2007–2008 (with Lin Chia-lung)	Succeeded by Yeh Ching-chuan
Preceded by Shih Jun-ji	Vice Premier of the Republic of China; 2019–2020	Succeeded by Shen Jong-chin
Preceded by Yang Ming-jou (acting)	Mayor of Kaohsiung; 2020–present	Incumbent
