= Hsu Li-ming =

Taiwanese politician

- 許立明
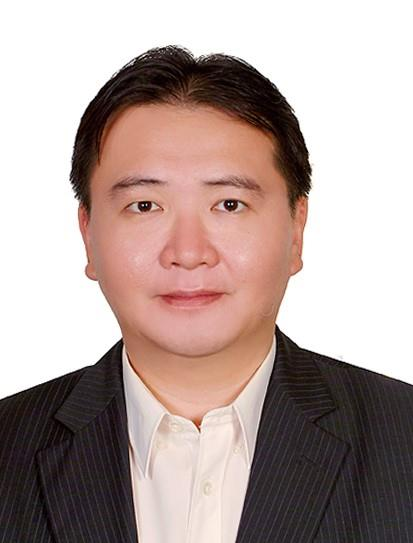
- Official portrait, 2018

24th Secretary-General of the Democratic Progressive Party
- In office 18 January 2023 – 17 January 2024
- Chairman: William Lai
- Preceded by: Lin Hsi-yao; Sydney Lin (acting)
- Succeeded by: Andrea Yang (acting); Lin Yu-chang

Acting Mayor of Kaohsiung
- In office 23 April 2018 – 25 December 2018
- Preceded by: Chen Chu
- Succeeded by: Han Kuo-yu

Personal details
- Born: 17 January 1969 (age 57) Mailiao, Yunlin, Taiwan
- Party: Democratic Progressive Party
- Education: National Chengchi University (LLB, LLM)

Hsu Li-ming (Chinese: 許立明; pinyin: Xǔ Lìmíng; born 17 January 1969) is a Taiwanese politician. He serves as the secretary general of the Democratic Progressive Party since January 2021. He previously served as the acting Mayor of Kaohsiung in 2018.

== Education ==
Hsu graduated from National Chengchi University with a bachelor's degree in law and a master's degree in law.

== Political career ==
Hsu chaired the Greater Kaohsiung Research, Development and Evaluation Commission before he became a deputy mayor of Kaohsiung in 2015. He was named acting mayor of Kaohsiung in April 2018, as predecessor Chen Chu was appointed presidential secretary general.

Hsu stepped down as secretary-general of the Democratic Progressive Party in January 2024.

Political offices
Preceded by Chen Chu	Mayor of Kaohsiung (acting); 2018	Succeeded by Han Kuo-yu
