= Kaohsiung City Government =

Municipal government in Taiwan

- 高雄市政府 (Note: In local languages: Traditional Chinese script: 高雄市政府; Mandarin Pinyin: Gāoxióng shì zhèngfǔ; Hokkien: Ko-hiông-chhī Chèng-hú)

Agency overview
- Formed: 1924; 102 years ago
- Jurisdiction: Kaohsiung City
- Headquarters: Lingya District (mayor's office)
- Ministers responsible: Chen Chi-mai, Mayor; Empty now, Deputy Mayors
- Website: www.kcg.gov.tw

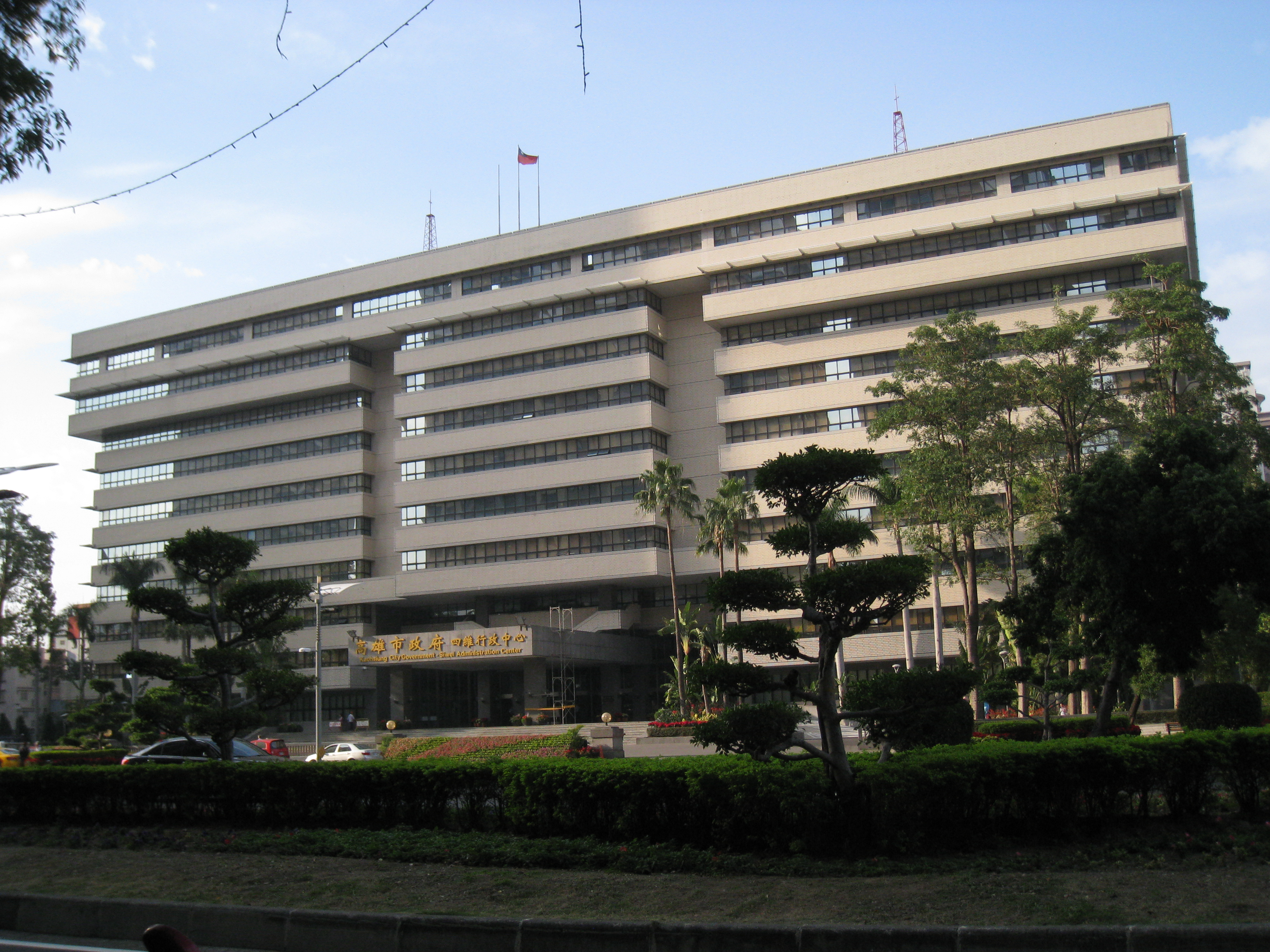
Kaohsiung City Hall - Sihwei Administration Center

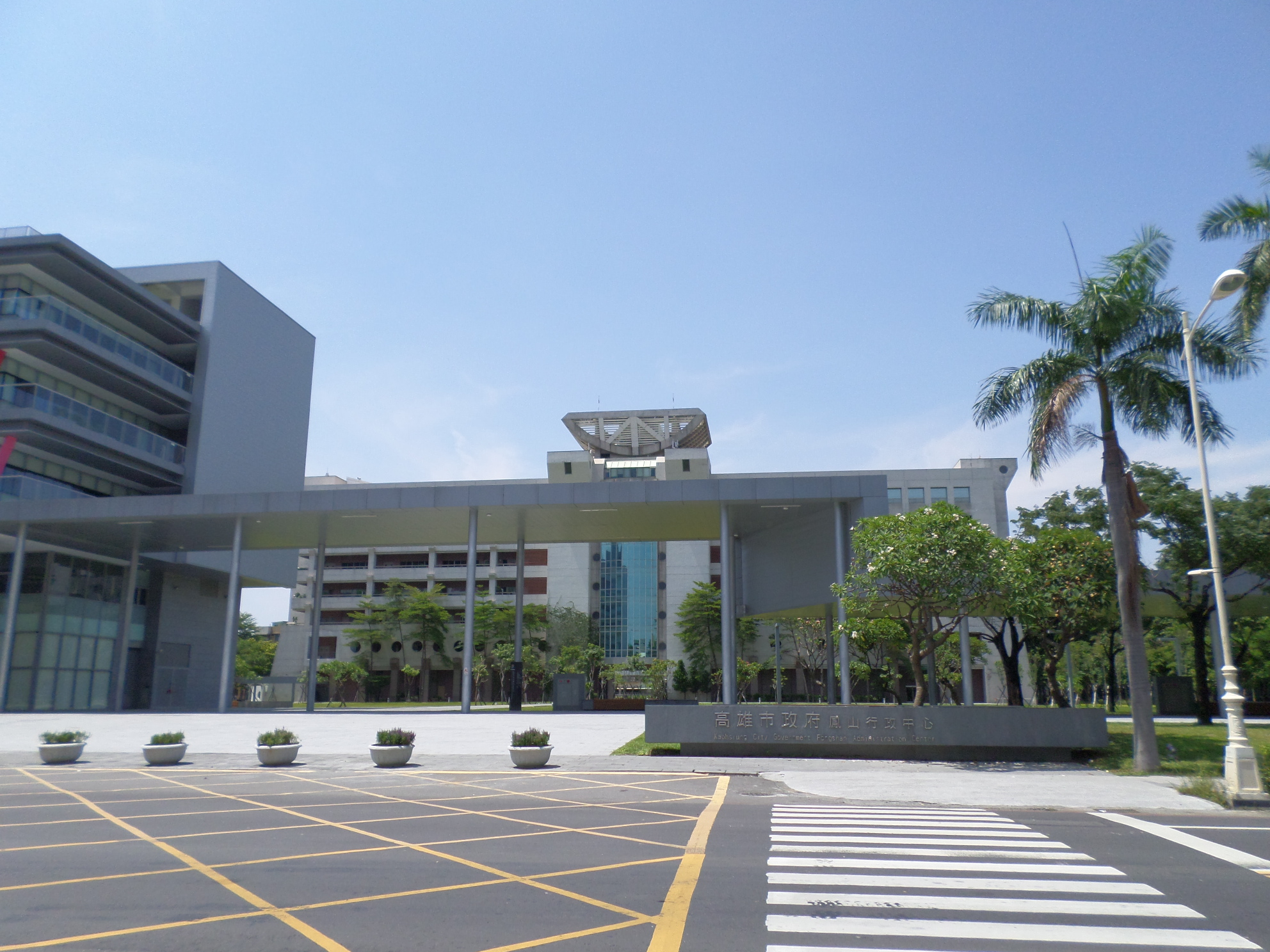
Kaohsiung City Hall - Fongshan Administration Center

The Kaohsiung City Government is the municipal government of Kaohsiung. It was formed after the merger of Kaohsiung County and Kaohsiung City in December 2010. Its chief administrator is the directly elected mayor of Kaohsiung.

== History ==
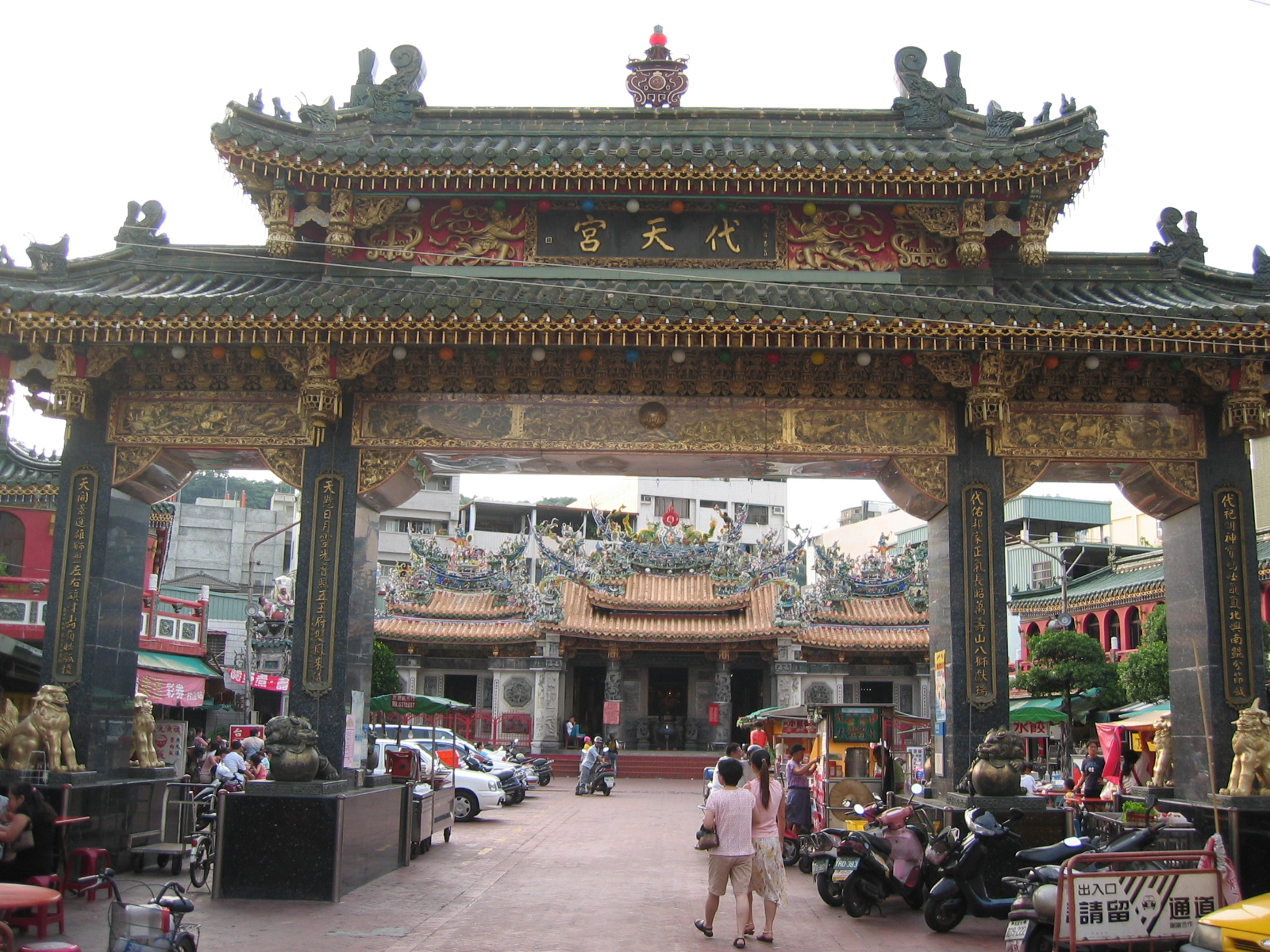
First Kaohsiung City Hall (1924-1939)

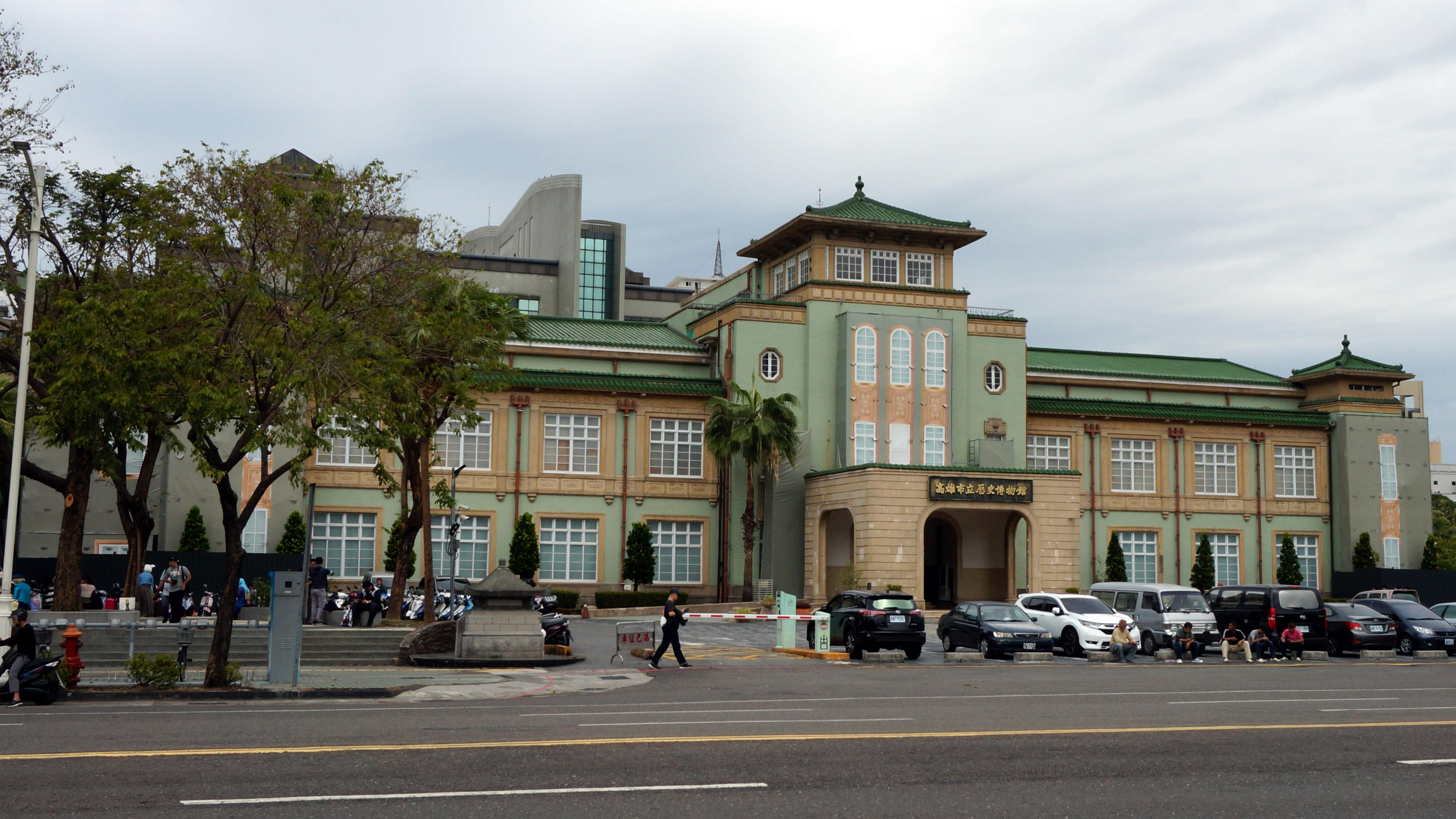
Second Kaohsiung City Hall (1939-1992)

In 1924, Takao Town (Japanese: 高雄街) was upgraded to city status, and the Takao City Office was established in modern-day Gushan by the Japanese government which reported directly to Takao Prefecture. The city hall was located at the modern-day Dai Tien Kung temple. The second city hall was built in 1938 at modern-day Zhongzheng 4th Road, Yancheng District, and commissioned on 16 September 1939.

After the handover of Taiwan from Japan to the Republic of China in 1945, the city was renamed Kaohsiung City Government.

A fast-growing population and rapid industrial and commercial development caused the expansion of the city government as well. In 1992, the city government moved to the new city hall building at Xiwei 3rd Road in Lingya District. The former city hall building in Yancheng District was turned into the Kaohsiung Museum of History on 25 October 1998.

== Administration ==
=== Bureaus ===
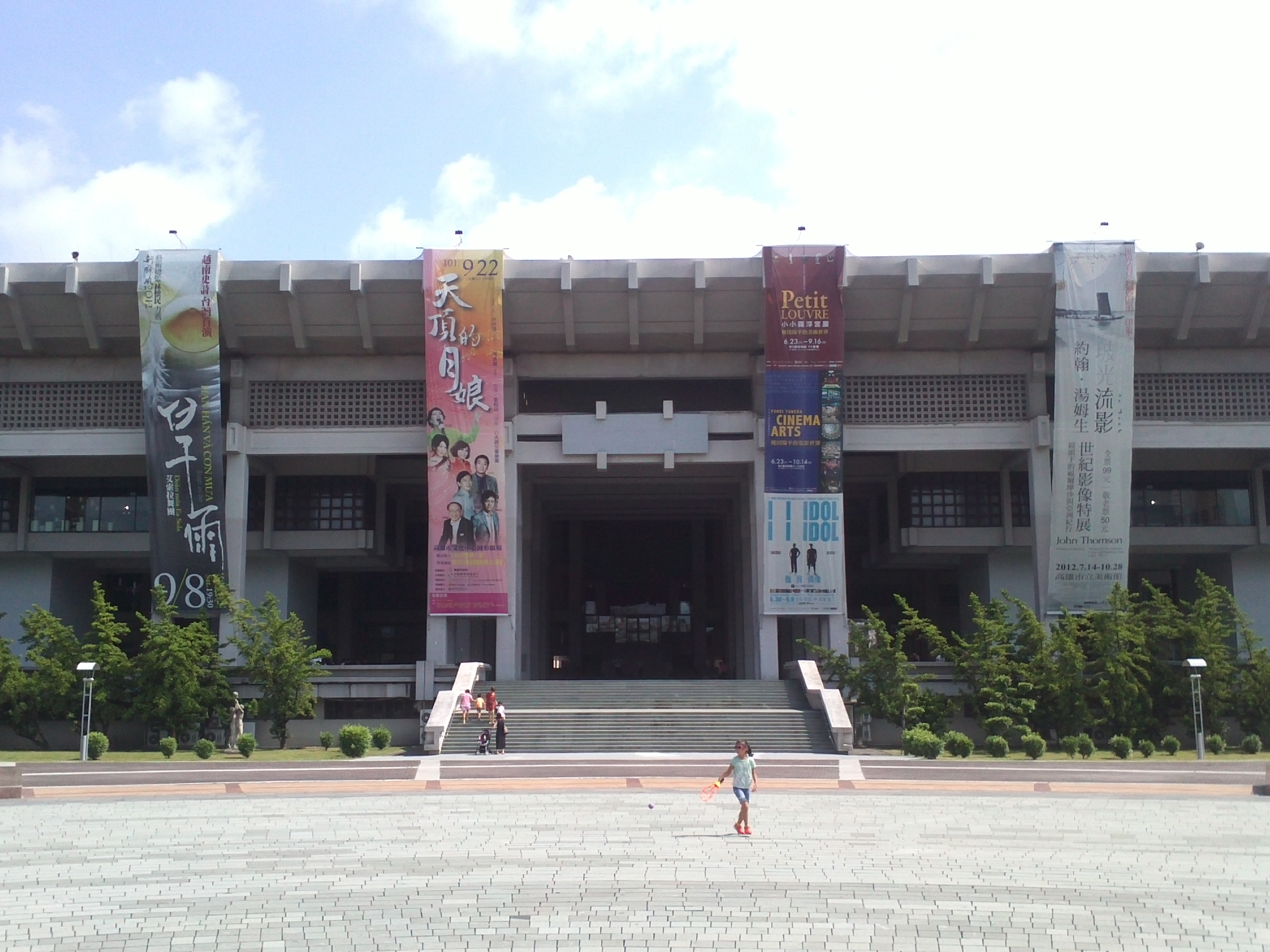
Cultural Affairs Bureau

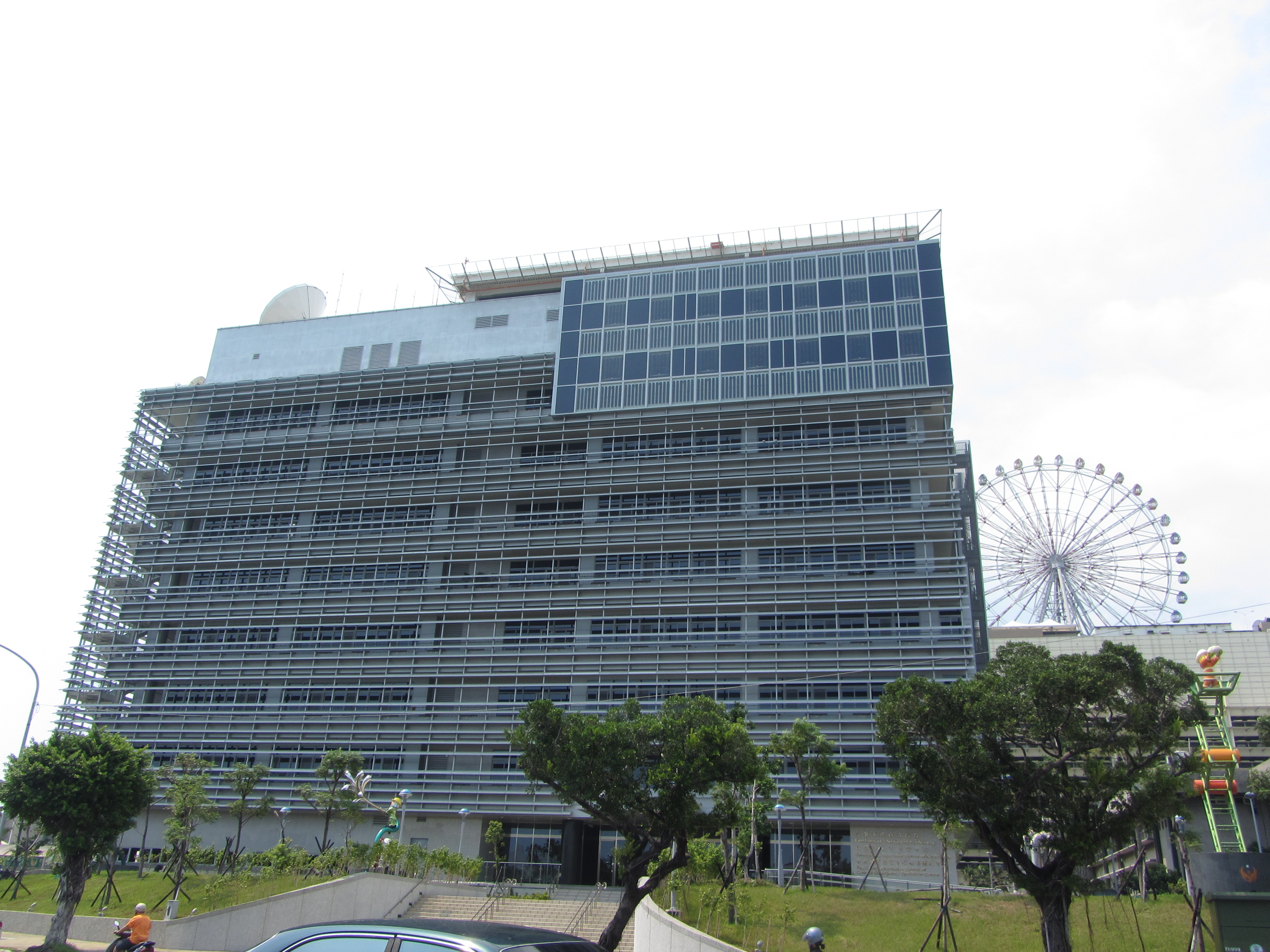
Fire Bureau

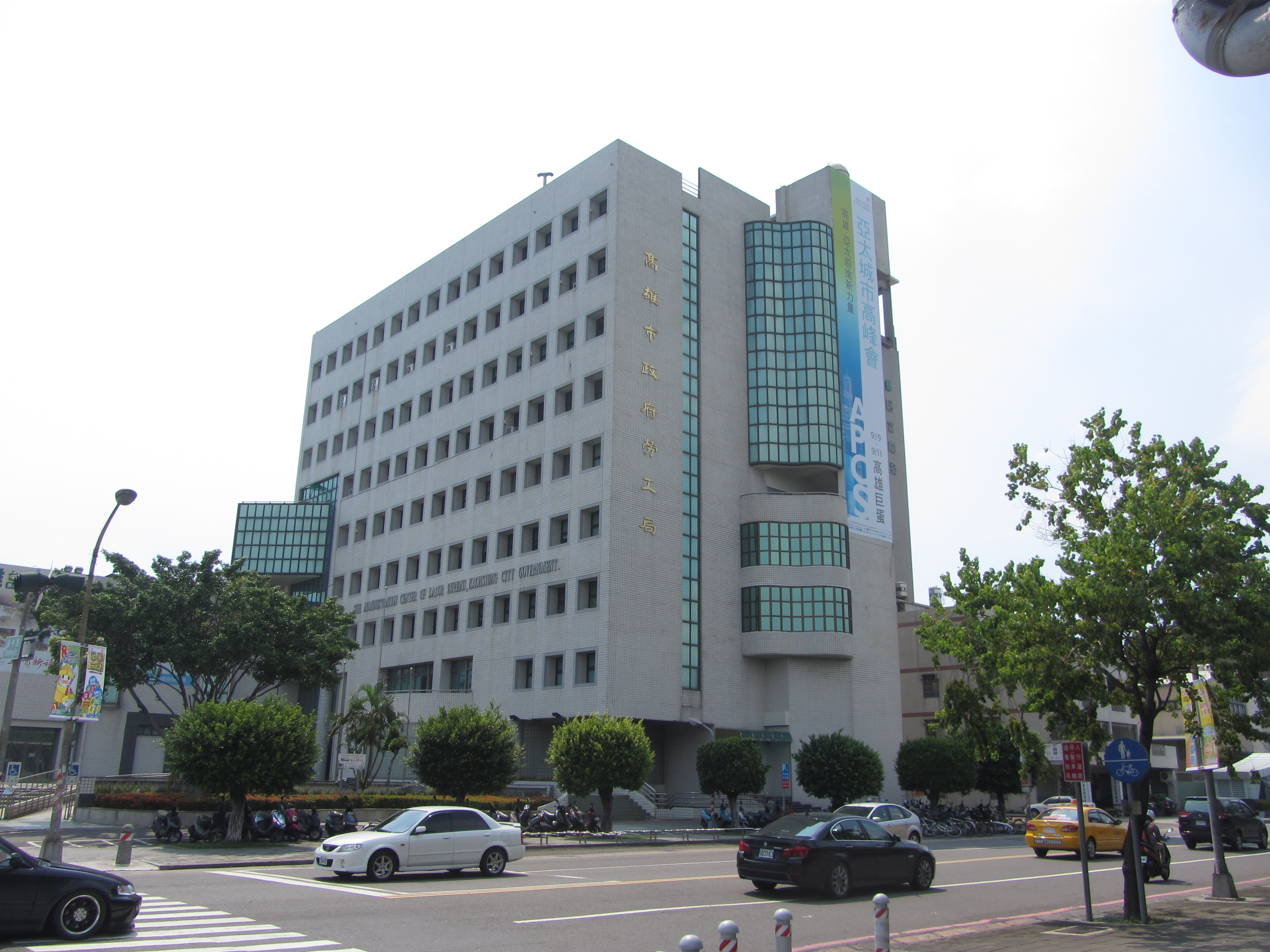
Labor Bureau

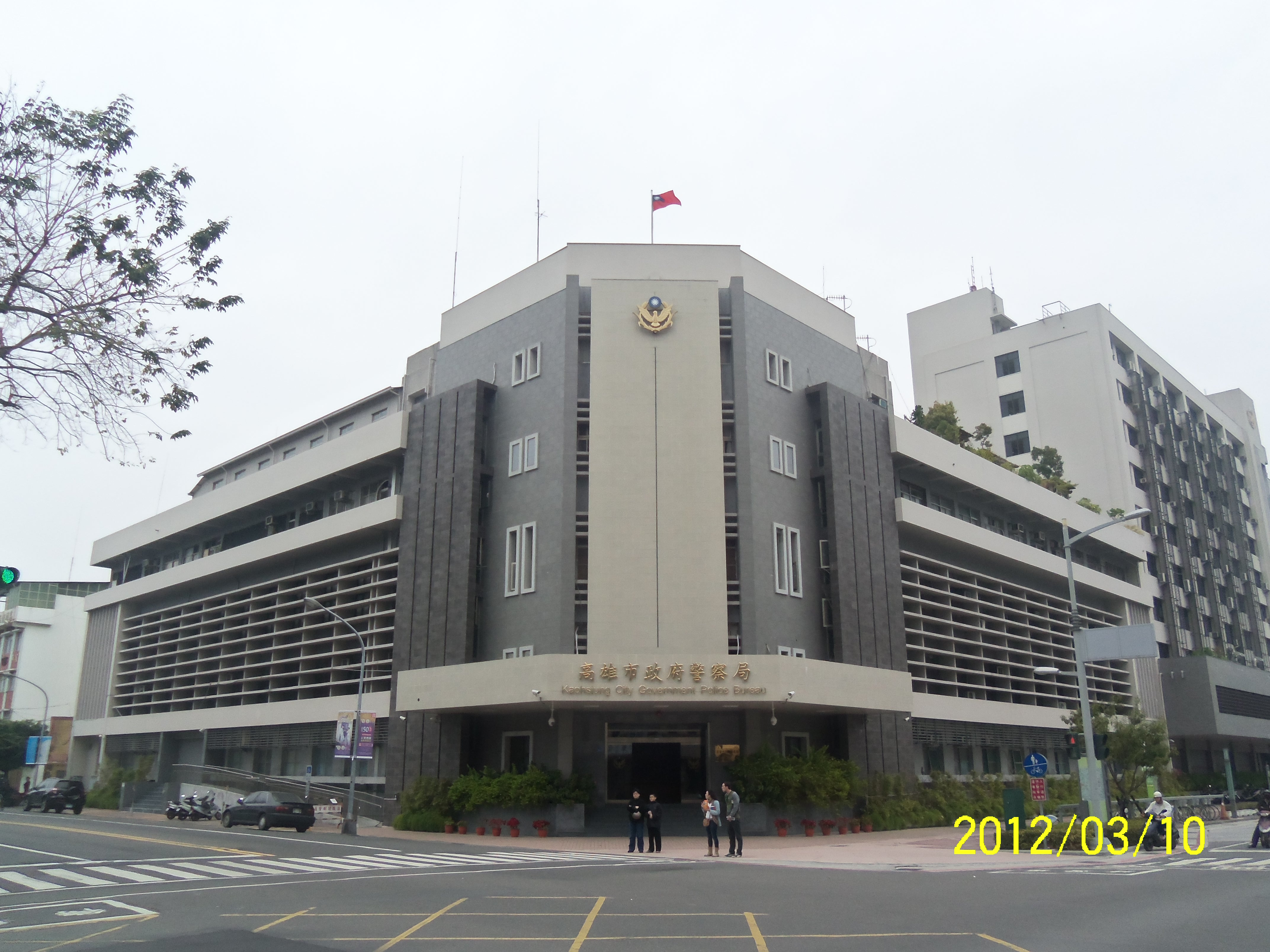
Police Department

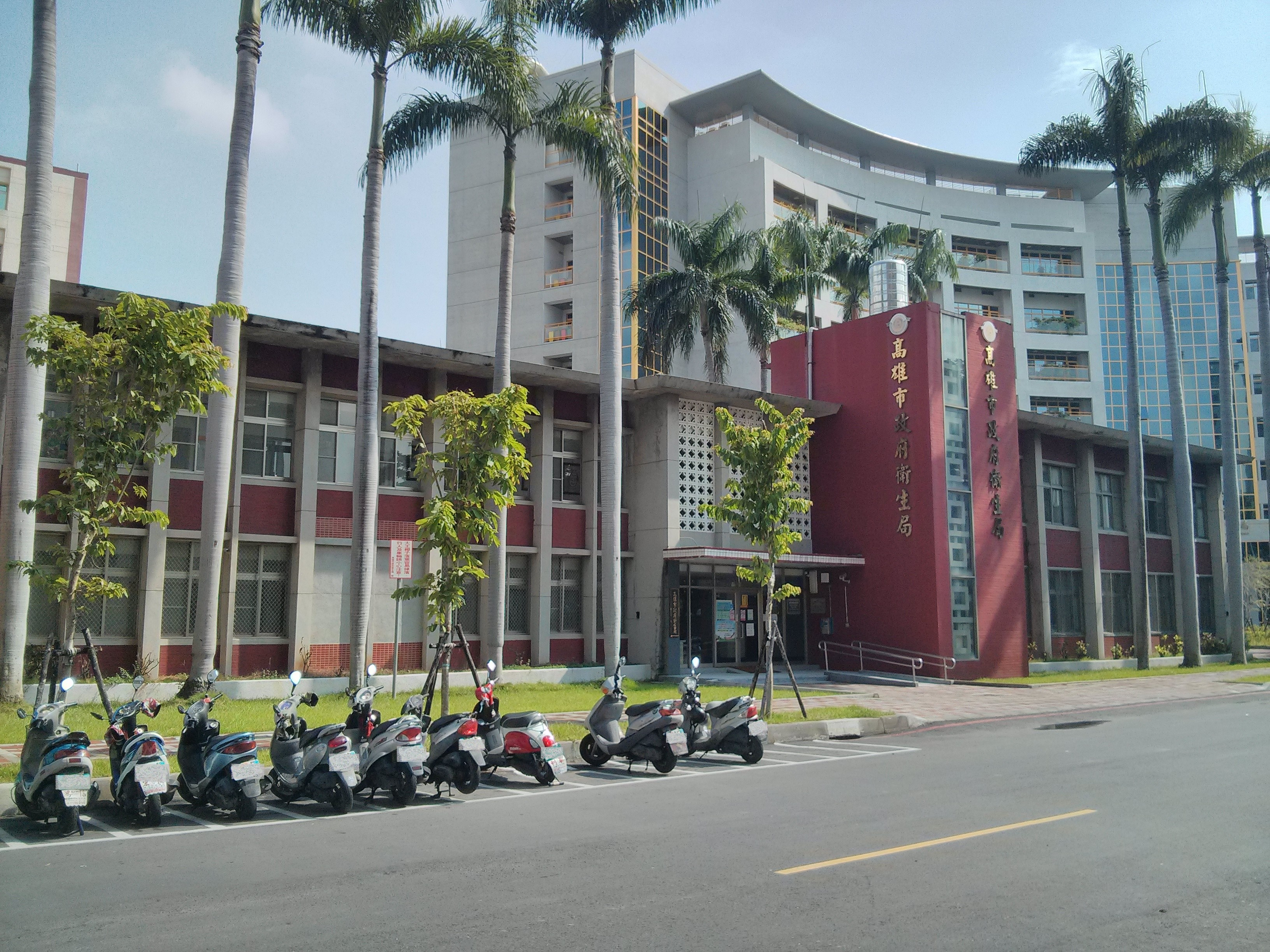
Public Health Bureau

- Civil Affairs Bureau
- Finance Bureau
- Education Bureau
- Economic Development Bureau
- Marine Bureau
- Agriculture Bureau
- Tourism Bureau
- Urban Development Bureau
- Public Works Bureau
- Water Resources Bureau
- Social Affairs Bureau
- Labor Affairs Bureau
- Kaohsiung City Police Department
- Fire Bureau
- Department of Health
- Environmental Protection Bureau
- Kaohsiung Mass Rapid Transit
- Bureau of Cultural Affairs
- Transportation Bureau
- Legal Affairs Bureau
- Military service Bureau
- Land Administration Bureau
- Information Bureau

=== Offices ===
- Secretariat
- Department of Budget, Accounting and Statistics
- Personnel Department
- Civil Service Ethics Office

=== Commissions ===
- Research, Development and Evaluation Commission
- Indigenous Affairs Commission
- Hakka Affairs Committee

== Mayor ==
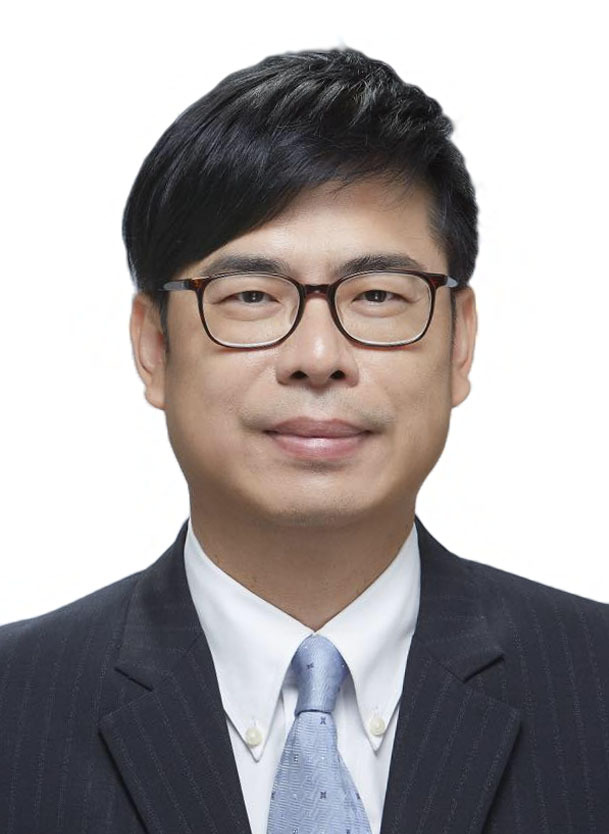
Chen Chi-mai, the incumbent Mayor of Kaohsiung

The mayor of Kaohsiung City is the chief executive officer of the city. The mayor is elected for a four-year term and limited to serving no more than two terms. Under the mayor there are 3 deputy mayors, 1 secretary-general, 2 deputy secretaries-general and 30 principal officers. The incumbent mayor of Kaohsiung is Chen Chi-mai of the Democratic Progressive Party.

== See also ==
- Kaohsiung City Council
- Mayor of Kaohsiung
- List of county magistrates of Kaohsiung
