= Yu Teng-fa =

Taiwanese politician (1904–1989)

- 余登發

Magistrate of Kaohsiung County
- In office 2 June 1960 – 27 September 1963
- Preceded by: Chen Chieh-hsing
- Succeeded by: Lin Shih-cheng (acting); Tai Liang-chin

Personal details
- Born: 21 September 1904 Takao Prefecture, Taiwan, Empire of Japan
- Died: 13 September 1989 (aged 84) Kaohsiung, Taiwan
- Party: Independent
- Other political affiliations: Kuomintang (1947–1948)
- Children: Yu Jui-yen (son); Huang Yu Hsiu-luan (daughter)

Yu Teng-fa (traditional Chinese: 余登發; simplified Chinese: 余登发; pinyin: Yú Dēngfā; 21 September 1904 – 13 September 1989) was a Taiwanese politician. His family's influence in Kaohsiung began with his own political career. Yu's daughter-in-law Yu Chen Yueh-ying succeeded his daughter Huang Yu Hsiu-luan in the Legislative Yuan. Yu Teng-fa played a major role in Yu Chen's political career. His grandchildren Yu Lin-ya, Yu Jane-daw, and Yu Cheng-hsien have also served in the Legislative Yuan.

== Life ==
Born to a family of wealthy farmers, Yu Teng-fa began his political career in 1947, when he was elected a Kuomintang member of the National Assembly. He left the KMT in 1948, though he remained friends with party members, namely Chen Hsin-an. Yu succeeded Chen Chieh-hsing as Kaohsiung County magistrate in 1960. That same year, he founded the China Democratic Self Government Research Association. His followers were known as the "black faction." Yu was invited to join the tangwai movement for democratization, and he did so. However, he remained opposed to Taiwanese independence, preferring unification with China. Yu yielded the Kaohsiung magistracy to Tai Liang-chin of Kaohsiung's "red faction" in 1963. The Kuomintang charged Yu with embezzlement, and he was jailed.

Elections to the National Assembly and Legislative Yuan were scheduled for December 1978, but postponed after the United States announced that it would soon diplomatically recognize the People's Republic of China. Yu protested the postponement of the elections, stating that the decision was unconstitutional, exposing the Kuomintang's penchant for relying on martial law. In January 1979, he and his son Yu Jui-yen were arrested prior to a demonstration against the postponement of elections and formally charged with "knowing a Communist and not reporting it." Yu's arrest led to a large protest organized by Hsu Hsin-liang. The event became known as the Qiaotou incident and was the first political demonstration since martial law was enacted in May 1949. The January 1979 protest prompted Hsu's impeachment by the Control Yuan, which in turn contributed to December's Kaohsiung Incident. Yu's alleged collaborator, Wu Tai-an, also known as Wu Chun-fa, went to trial shortly after Yu's arrest. Proceedings against Yu Teng-fa and Yu Jui-yen began in March 1979, and were overseen by a military court of the Taiwan Garrison Command. During his trial, Yu Teng-fa was represented by Yao Chia-wen. On 16 April 1979, Yu was sentenced to eight years imprisonment. In her memoir, Annette Lu wrote that the charges against Yu were "an elaborate frame up." Three years later, Yu was released on medical parole. In 1986, while serving as magistrate of Kaohsiung, Yu Teng-fa's daughter-in-law Yu Chen Yueh-ying merged the "black faction" with the Democratic Progressive Party. On 13 September 1989, Yu Teng-fa was found dead at his home in Kaohsiung. There was a wound in the back of his head, and he was lying in a supine position. In 1995, Kao Ming-hui, a retired deputy chief of the Investigation Bureau based in Kaohsiung, wrote that charges against Yu were fabricated by Kao's agency, additionally stating that Yu was mentally unstable and could not recognize the flag of the People's Republic of China when questioned.
