= 2010 Taiwanese local elections =

- 27 November 2010 (Note: Township/city council and village elections in counties were held on 12 June 2010)

5 mayors and others (Note: 314 councillors; 3,757 village chiefs in municipalities; 2,322 township/city council representatives; 4,074 village chiefs in counties; Figures in this infobox are for mayor elections unless otherwise noted)
- Registered: 10,663,545
- Turnout: 71.71% ▲5.96 pp (Note: Compared to the 2 municipal mayor elections of 2006)
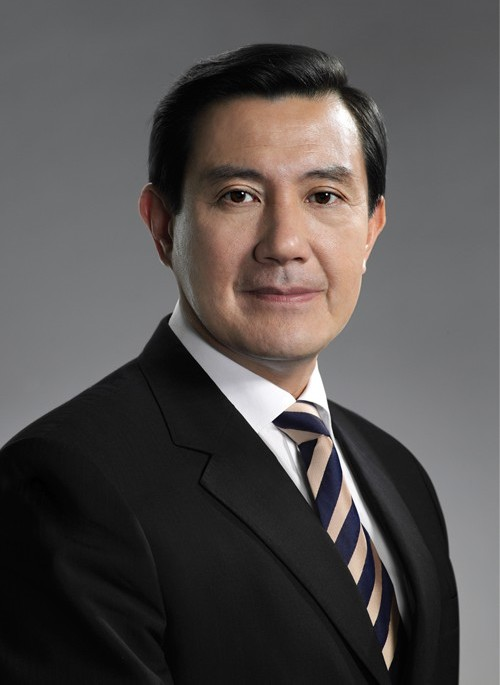

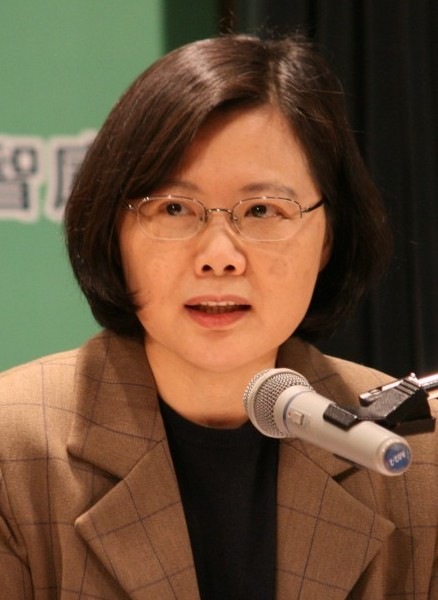
	First party	Second party
Leader	Ma Ying-jeou	Tsai Ing-wen
Party	KMT	DPP
Leader since	17 October 2009	20 May 2008
Last election	3 seats, 52.13%	2 seats, 45.23%
Seats won	3	2
Seat change	Steady	Steady
Popular vote	3,369,052	3,772,373
Percentage	44.54%	49.87%
Swing	▼7.59 pp	▲4.65 pp
Councillors	130	130
Township/city representatives	715	169
- Elected magistrate/mayor party by seat

Local elections were held in Taiwan on 27 November 2010 to elect mayors, councillors, and village chiefs of special-municipalities (Kaohsiung, New Taipei, Taichung, Tainan and Taipei), known as the Five Municipalities Elections (Chinese: 五都選舉). Mayoral candidates for the Kuomintang were elected in New Taipei, Taipei, and Taichung, while candidates for the Democratic Progressive Party were elected in Kaohsiung and Tainan. On the eve of the election, Sean Lien, son of former Vice President Chan Lien, was shot in face when he was campaigning for a Kuomintang New Taipei councillor candidate.

Earlier in the year on 12 June 2010, elections were held to elect representatives in township/city councils and village chiefs.

== Results summary ==
Elected mayors and council composition in the 2010 Taiwanese local election
Subdivision	Mayor	Council				
Subdivision	Mayor	First party	Seats (Note: Bold figures indicate majority)	Second party	Seats	Total seats
New Taipei City	Eric Chu	Kuomintang	30	DPP	28	66
Taipei City	Hau Lung-pin	Kuomintang	31	DPP	23	62
Taichung City	Jason Hu	Kuomintang	27	DPP	24	63
Tainan City	Lai Ching-te	DPP	27	Kuomintang	13	57
Kaohsiung City	Chen Chu	Kuomintang	29	DPP	28	66

Mayoral election results
Subdivision	Electorate	Turnout (%)	Winner			Runner-up			Map
Subdivision	Electorate	Turnout (%)	Name	Votes	%	Name	Votes	%	Map
New Taipei City	3,006,877	71.25	Eric Chu	1,115,536	52.61	Tsai Ing-wen	1,004,900	47.39	
Taipei City	2,045,925	70.65	Hau Lung-pin	797,865	55.65	Su Tseng-chang	628,129	43.81	
Taichung City	1,977,368	73.15	Jason Hu	730,284	51.12	Su Jia-chyuan	698,358	48.88	
Tainan City	1,467,256	71.01	Lai Ching-te	619,897	60.41	Kuo Tien-tsai	406,196	39.59	
Kaohsiung City	2,166,119	72.52	Chen Chu	821,089	52.80	Yang Chiu-hsing	414,950	26.68	

== Taipei ==
=== Electoral background ===
As the capital of Taiwan, Taipei functions as the economic and political centre of Taiwan, and is currently the largest city of Taiwan. Due to the great allocation of resources to Taipei, the Municipal Mayoral position of Taipei is of extreme strategic importance within the political arena, and has always been a fiercely contested position. Because two directly elected Municipal Mayors of Taipei, Chen Shui-bian and Ma Ying-jeou, were elected the Presidents in 2000 and 2008 respectively, the position has been widely speculated to be a "first-step" towards the Presidential Office.

Having been under the administration of the Kuomintang for the past twelve years, Taipei is commonly considered to be solidly in the Pan-Blue political camp. Recent estimates show that approximately 60% of voters who identify themselves with political inclination support the Pan-Blue Coalition, whilst 40% support the Pan-Green Coalition. A significant proportion of eligible voters in Taiwan identify themselves as having no political inclination. The incumbent Taipei Municipal Mayor Hau Lung-pin of the Kuomintang stood for his second term in this election.

Results of Past Taipei Municipal Mayoral Elections
Year	Winning Candidate	Political Party
1994	Chen Shui-bian	Democratic Progressive Party
1998	Ma Ying-jeou	Kuomintang
2002	Ma Ying-jeou	Kuomintang
2006	Hau Lung-pin	Kuomintang

=== Polling ===
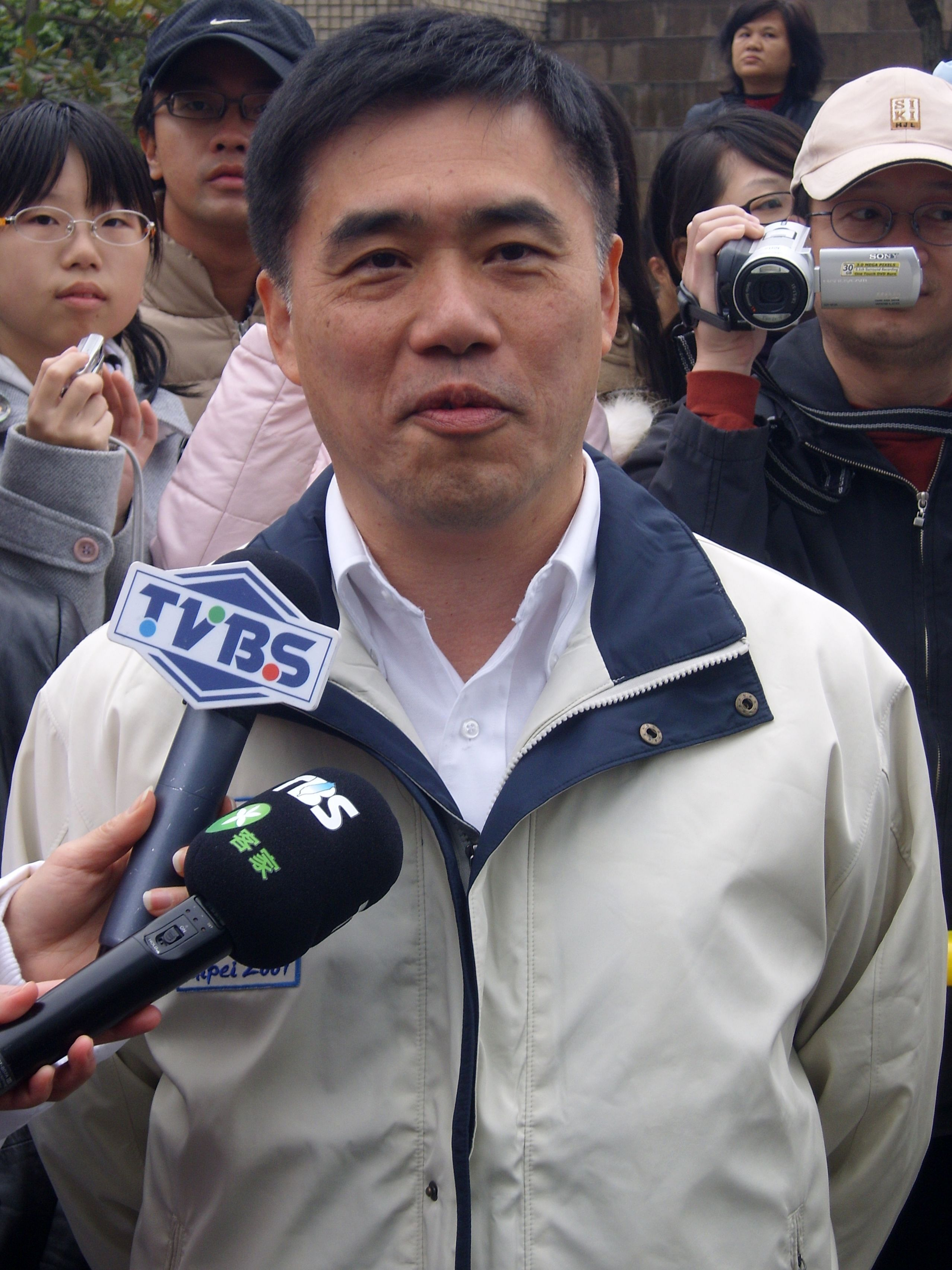
Hau Lung-pin

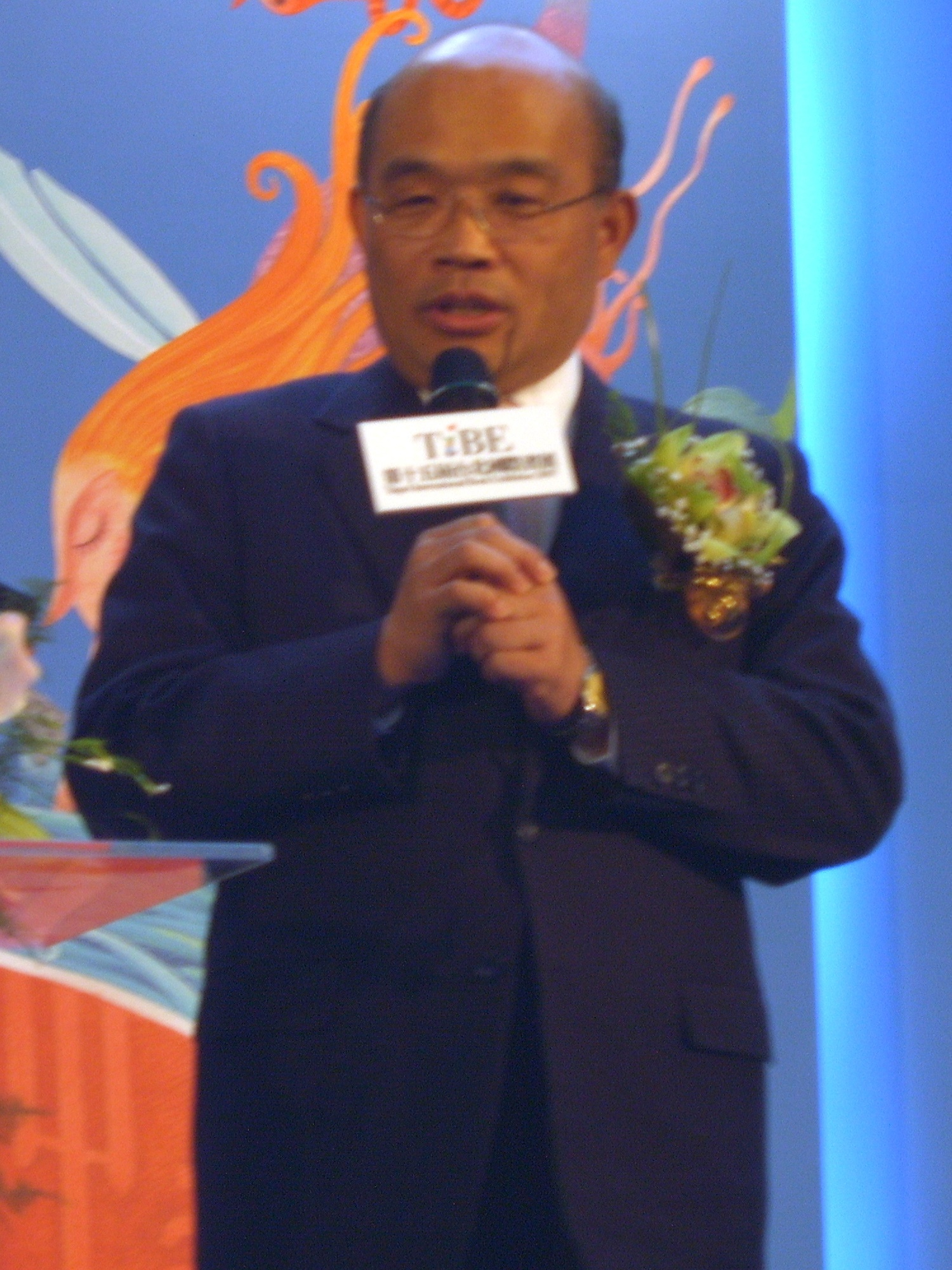
Su Tseng-chang

Poll source	Date of completion	Hau Lung-pin	Su Tseng-chang	Undecided
TVBS	May 26, 2010	46%	41%	14%
Era Television	June 11, 2010	39.3%	41.0%	19.6%
Era Television	June 22, 2010	41.8%	37.7%	20.5%
China Times	July 15, 2010	42.9%	38.5%	18.7%
TVBS	July 20, 2010	44%	41%	15%
I-tel Research	August 19, 2010	58.33%	41.67%	—
TVBS	August 25, 2010	45%	42%	12%
Apple Daily	August 29, 2010	43.12%	44.68%	12.20%
I-tel Research	September 1, 2010	44.55%	55.45%	—
TVBS	September 8, 2010	42%	45%	13%
China Times	September 17, 2010	39.0%	41.2%	19.8%
I-tel Research	September 20, 2010	52.94%	47.06%	—
United Daily News	September 26, 2010	41%	33%	26%
Apple Daily	October 3, 2010	47.52%	35.64%	16.84%
TVBS	October 6, 2010	43%	42%	15%
Shih Hsin University	October 12, 2010	33.2%	30.1%	36.7%
Liberty Times	October 21, 2010	36.84%	37.45%	25.71%
United Daily News	October 24, 2010	48%	37%	15%
TVBS	October 27, 2010	46%	40%	14%
China Times	November 3, 2010	42.7%	42.1%	15.2%
Wealth Magazine	November 7, 2010	37.2%	38.5%	24.3%
Shih Hsin University	November 8, 2010	33.4%	33.0%	33.6%
Democratic Progressive Party	November 10, 2010	39.3%	40.8%	19.9%
TVBS	November 11, 2010	49%	39%	12%
China Times	November 14, 2010	47.3%	39.6%	13.2%

=== Predictions ===
Source	Date of release	Voter turnout	Hau Lung-pin	Su Tseng-chang
TVBS	August 25, 2010	66%	51%	49%
TVBS	September 8, 2010	67%	48%	52%
I-tel Research	October 4, 2010	—	50.59%	49.41%
United Daily News	October 24, 2010	—	49%	51%
TVBS	October 27, 2010	68%	50.3%	49.7%
TVBS	November 11, 2010	68%	53%	47%
Global Views	November 27, 2010	68%	50.6%	48.5%

=== Results ===
==== Municipal Mayoral Election ====
Party	#	Candidate	Votes	Percentage
Kuomintang	2	Hau Lung-pin (郝龍斌)	797,865	55.65%
Democratic Progressive Party	5	Su Tseng-chang (蘇貞昌)	628,129	43.81%
Independent	4	Francis Wu (吳武明)	3,672	0.26%
Independent	3	Helen Hsiao (蕭淑華)	2,238	0.16%
Independent	1	Wu Yen-cheng (吳炎成)	1,832	0.13%
Total			1,433,736	100.00%
Voter turnout			70.65%	

==== Municipal Councilmen Election ====
Party	Votes	Percentage	Seats
Kuomintang	637,255	44.93%	31
Democratic Progressive Party	516,140	36.39%	23
New Party	74,116	5.23%	3
People First Party	65,550	4.62%	2
Taiwan Solidarity Union	36,302	2.56%	1
Green Party Taiwan	16,329	1.15%	0
Taiwan Constitution Association	188	0.01%	0
Independent	72,455	5.11%	2
Total	1,418,335	100.00%	62
Voter turnout	70.65%		

==== Ward Chiefs Election ====
Party	Votes	Percentage	Seats
Kuomintang	648,243	48.63%	247
Democratic Progressive Party	105,465	7.91%	41
Green Party Taiwan	964	0.07%	0
Independent	578,227	43.38%	168
Total	1,332,899	100.00%	456
Voter turnout	70.72%		

== New Taipei ==
=== Electoral background ===
New Taipei (formerly Taipei County) was promoted into a central municipality, and replaced Taipei City as the largest city of Taiwan. Taipei County was under the administration of the Kuomintang, with the incumbent Taipei County Magistrate Chou Hsi-wei serving as mayor. However, unlike Taipei City, which is solidly in the Pan-Blue political camp, the electoral composition of Taipei County is more evenly distributed between Pan-Blue and Pan-Green Coalition supporters, with only a very slight overall inclination towards the Pan-Blue political camp. It should also be noted that Taipei County had previously been under the administration of the Democratic Progressive Party for 16 years, until the incumbent County Magistrate Chou Hsi-wei won power 5 years ago.

Results of Past Taipei County Magistrate Elections
Year	Winning Candidate	Political Party
1989	You Ching	Democratic Progressive Party
1993	You Ching	Democratic Progressive Party
1997	Su Tseng-chang	Democratic Progressive Party
2001	Su Tseng-chang	Democratic Progressive Party
2005	Chou Hsi-wei	Kuomintang

=== Polling ===
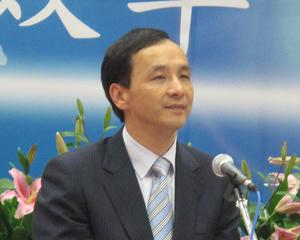
Eric Chu Li-luan

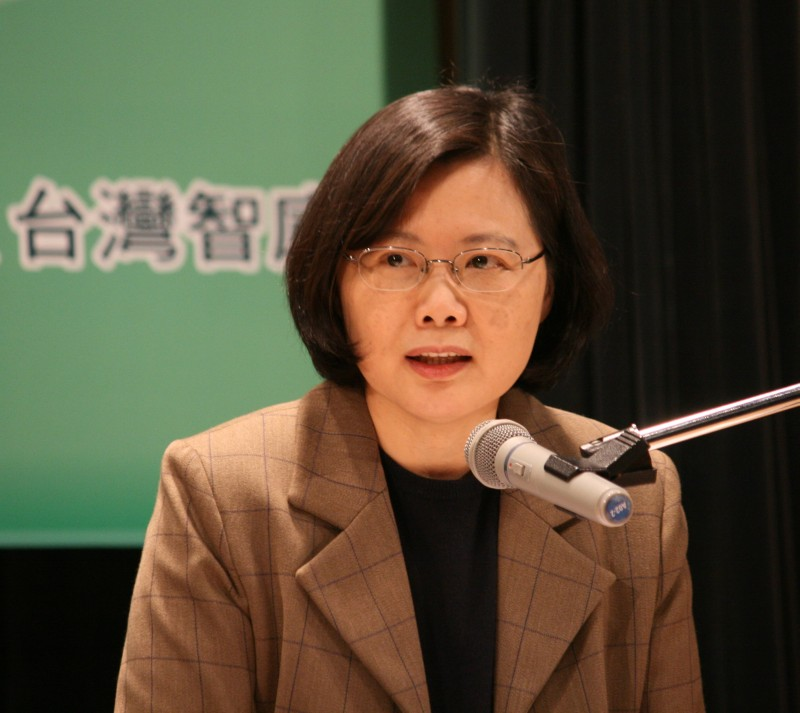
Tsai Ing-wen

Poll source	Date of completion	Eric Chu Li-luan	Tsai Ing-wen	Undecided
China Times	May 24, 2010	33.0%	28.2%	38.7%
TVBS	May 24, 2010	43%	44%	14%
TVBS	July 16, 2010	46%	40%	14%
China Times	July 17, 2010	39.2%	39.8%	21.0%
Era Television	July 21, 2010	41.1%	36.2%	22.7%
Democratic Progressive Party	August 19, 2010	44.2%	44.1%	11.7%
TVBS	August 23, 2010	47%	40%	13%
I-tel Research	August 23, 2010	45%	55%	—
I-tel Research	September 7, 2010	43.9%	56.1%	—
Apple Daily	September 11, 2010	47.04%	39.08%	13.88%
China Times	September 17, 2010	42.1%	38.1%	19.8%
Democratic Progressive Party	September 23, 2010	44.4%	43.5%	12.1%
United Daily News	September 27, 2010	45%	28%	26%
I-tel Research	September 28, 2010	55.63%	44.38%	—
Apple Daily	October 4, 2010	48.49%	35.13%	16.38%
TVBS	October 5, 2010	47%	35%	17%
Democratic Progressive Party	October 7, 2010	43.1%	43.5%	13.4%
Citizen's Association of Taiwan	October 8, 2010	37.9%	35.3%	26.8%
Shih Hsin University	October 10, 2010	35.3%	31.3%	33.4%
China Times	October 17, 2010	43%	34%	23%
Liberty Times	October 19, 2010	35.81%	34.00%	30.19%
United Daily News	October 27, 2010	45%	37%	18%
TVBS	October 29, 2010	44%	40%	16%
China Times	November 2, 2010	44%	38%	18%
Liberty Times	November 2, 2010	35.82%	38.49%	25.69%
Wealth Magazine	November 5, 2010	39.3%	34.3%	26.4%
Decision Making Research	November 6, 2010	39.9%	37.2%	22.9%
Shih Hsin University	November 7, 2010	33.5%	30.4%	36.1%
China Times	November 8, 2010	45.6%	41.6%	12.8%
TVBS	November 9, 2010	45%	38%	17%
Democratic Progressive Party	November 12, 2010	40.3%	39.1%	20.6%
Liberty Times	November 12, 2010	38.81%	39.29%	21.90%

=== Predictions ===
Source	Date of release	Voter turnout	Eric Chu Li-luan	Tsai Ing-wen
TVBS	August 23, 2010	69%	53%	47%
I-tel Research	October 4, 2010	—	49.56%	50.44%
United Daily News	October 27, 2010	—	55%	45%
TVBS	October 29, 2010	71%	51%	49%
TVBS	November 9, 2010	71%	51%	49%
Global Views	November 27, 2010	69.1%	48.9%	51.1%

=== Results ===
==== Municipal Mayoral Election ====
Party	#	Candidate	Votes	Percentage
Kuomintang	1	Eric Chu Li-luan (朱立倫)	1,115,536	52.61%
Democratic Progressive Party	2	Tsai Ing-wen (蔡英文)	1,004,900	47.39%
Total			2,120,436	100.00%
Voter turnout			71.25%	

==== Municipal Councilmen Election ====
Party	Votes	Percentage	Seats
Kuomintang	831,590	39.74%	30
Democratic Progressive Party	724,807	34.64%	28
People First Party	40,755	1.95%	0
New Party	18,807	0.90%	0
Taiwan Solidarity Union	33,789	1.61%	0
Green Party Taiwan	8,321	0.40%	0
Independent	434,368	20.76%	8
Total	2,092,437	100.00%	66
Voter turnout	71.29%		

==== Ward Chiefs Election ====
Party	Votes	Percentage	Seats
Kuomintang	645,761	32.68%	354
Democratic Progressive Party	75,790	3.84%	25
Chinese Reunification Party	1,912	0.10%	1
People First Party	208	0.01%	0
Independent	1,252,189	63.37%	652
Total	1,975,860	100.00%	1,032
Voter turnout	71.45%		

== Taichung ==
=== Electoral background ===
Results of Past Taichung County Magistrate Elections
Year	Winning Candidate	Political Party
1989	Liao Liou-yi	Kuomintang
1993	Liao Liou-yi	Kuomintang
1997	Liao Yung-lai	Democratic Progressive Party
2001	Huang Chung-sheng	Kuomintang
2005	Huang Chung-sheng	Kuomintang

Results of Past Taichung City Mayoral Elections
Year	Winning Candidate	Political Party
1989	Lin Po-jung	Kuomintang
1993	Lin Po-jung	Kuomintang
1997	Chang Wen-ying	Democratic Progressive Party
2001	Jason Hu Chih-chiang	Kuomintang
2005	Jason Hu Chih-chiang	Kuomintang

The newly created central municipality Taichung will be formed from the merging and elevation of Taichung County and Taichung City, both of which are currently county-level divisions of Taiwan. At present, both Taichung County and Taichung are under the administration of the Kuomintang, with the incumbent Taichung County Magistrate being Huang Chung-sheng and the incumbent Taichung City Mayor being Jason Hu Chih-chiang. The electoral composition of Taichung County is relatively balanced with only a slight overall inclination towards the Pan-Blue political camp, whereas Taichung City is commonly considered to be mildly leaning towards the Pan-Blue political camp. It is estimated that in Taichung County, approximately 52% of voters who identify themselves with political inclination support the Pan-Blue Coalition, whilst 48% support the Pan-Green Coalition. In Taichung City, the proportion of Pan-Blue to Pan-Green supporters within voters who identify themselves with political inclination is approximately 55% to 45%.

=== Polling ===
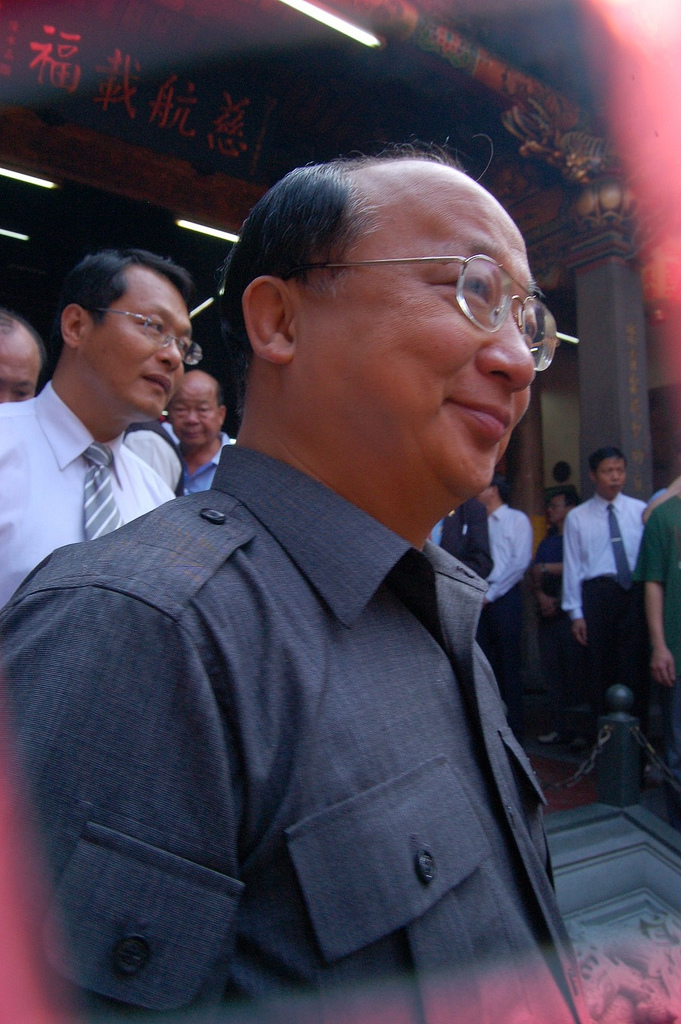
Jason Hu Chih-chiang

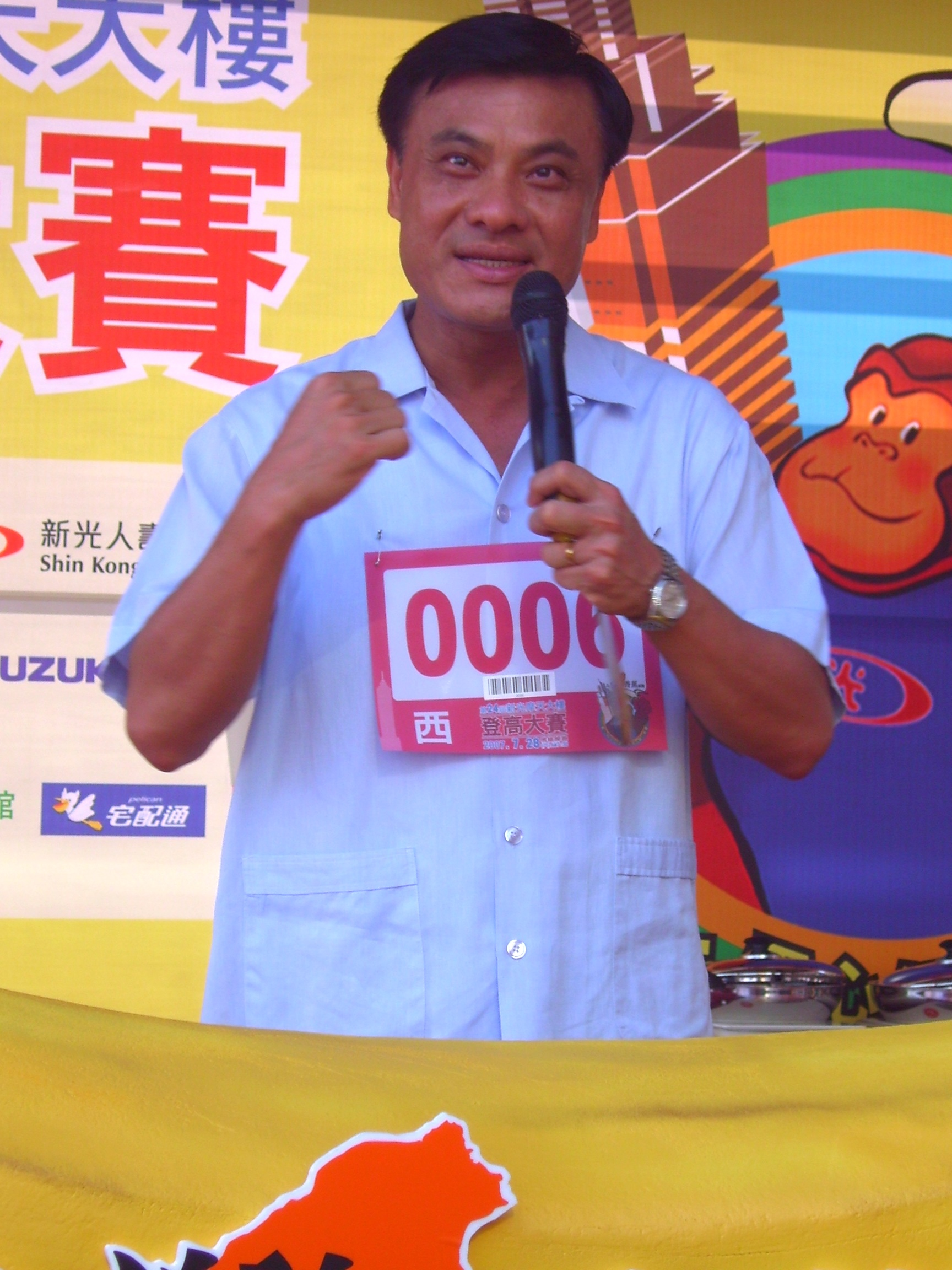
Su Jia-chyuan

Poll source	Date of completion	Jason Hu Chih-chiang	Su Jia-chyuan	Undecided
Apple Daily	May 24, 2010	53.40%	35.39%	11.21%
TVBS	May 25, 2010	57%	26%	17%
United Daily News	June 4, 2010	46%	24%	30%
Liberty Times	June 9, 2010	35.59%	28.71%	29.67%
Era Television	July 6, 2010	44.6%	32.5%	22.9%
TVBS	July 22, 20102	51%	31%	19%
Era Television	July 27, 2010	43.5%	30.7%	25.8%
I-tel Research	August 26, 2010	62%	38%	—
TVBS	August 27, 2010	51%	30%	19%
I-tel Research	September 9, 2010	52.25%	47.75%	—
Democratic Progressive Party	September 15, 2010	45%	36%	19%
China Times	September 19, 2010	41%	35%	25%
Apple Daily	September 26, 2010	51.82%	36.26%	11.92%
United Daily News	September 28, 2010	43%	25%	29%
Democratic Progressive Party	September 29, 2010	46.4%	33.3%	20.3%
I-tel Research	September 29, 2010	59.57%	40.43%	—
TVBS	October 12, 2010	47%	34%	18%
Shih Hsin University	October 12, 2010	37.9%	22.2%	39.9%
Democratic Progressive Party	October 13, 2010	45.7%	35.3%	19.0%
United Daily News	October 27, 2010	49%	31%	20%
Democratic Progressive Party	October 27, 2010	40.5%	35.4%	24.1%
China Times	October 31, 2010	43%	33%	23%
Liberty Times	November 5, 2010	34.85%	30.04%	35.11%
Democratic Progressive Party	November 6, 2010	40.1%	35.1%	24.8%
Shih Hsin University	November 9, 2010	36.3%	26.5%	37.2%
China Times	November 12, 2010	47.1%	40.1%	12.8%
Beterly Research	November 15, 2010	28.9%	29.2%	41.9%

=== Predictions ===
Source	Date of release	Voter turnout	Jason Hu Chih-chiang	Su Jia-chyuan
TVBS	August 27, 2010	65%	58%	42%
I-tel Research	October 4, 2010	—	57.28%	42.72%
United Daily News	October 27, 2010	—	56%	44%
Global Views	November 27, 2010	64.1%	50.6%	49.4%

=== Results ===
==== Municipal Mayoral Election ====
Party	#	Candidate	Votes	Percentage
Kuomintang	2	Jason Hu Chih-chiang (胡志強)	730,284	51.12%
Democratic Progressive Party	1	Su Jia-chyuan (蘇嘉全)	698,358	48.88%
Total			1,428,642	100.00%
Voter turnout			73.15%	

==== Municipal Councilmen Election ====
Party	Votes	Percentage	Seats
Kuomintang	531,365	37.64%	27
Democratic Progressive Party	460,345	32.61%	24
Taiwan Solidarity Union	24,396	1.73%	1
People First Party	9,247	0.66%	1
Independent	386,217	27.36%	10
Total	1,411,570	100.00%	63
Voter turnout	73.21%		

==== Ward Chiefs Election ====
Party	Votes	Percentage	Seats
Kuomintang	465,827	34.40%	227
Democratic Progressive Party	54,623	4.03%	18
Independent	833,529	61.56%	379
Total	1,353,979	100.00%	624
Voter turnout	73.31%		

== Tainan ==
=== Electoral background ===
Results of Past Tainan County Magistrate Elections
Year	Winning Candidate	Political Party
1989	Lee Ya-chiao	Kuomintang
1993	Mark Chen Tang-shan	Democratic Progressive Party
1997	Mark Chen Tang-shan	Democratic Progressive Party
2001	Su Huan-chih	Democratic Progressive Party
2005	Su Huan-chih	Democratic Progressive Party

Results of Past Tainan City Mayoral Elections
Year	Winning Candidate	Political Party
1989	Shih Chih-ming	Kuomintang
1993	Shih Chih-ming	Kuomintang
1997	George Chang Tsan-hung	Democratic Progressive Party
2001	Hsu Tain-tsair	Democratic Progressive Party
2005	Hsu Tain-tsair	Democratic Progressive Party

The newly created central municipality Tainan will be formed from the merging and elevation of Tainan County and Tainan City, both of which are currently county-level divisions of Taiwan. The incumbent Tainan County Magistrate Su Huan-chih and the incumbent Tainan City Mayor being Hsu Tain-tsair are both members of the Democratic Progressive Party. Having been under the administration of the Democratic Progressive Party for the past seventeen and thirteen years respectively, both Tainan County and Tainan City are commonly considered to be strongholds of the Pan-Green political camp. It is estimated that in both the county and the city, approximately 60% of voters who identify themselves with political inclination support the Pan-Green Coalition, whilst 40% support the Pan-Blue Coalition.

=== Polling ===
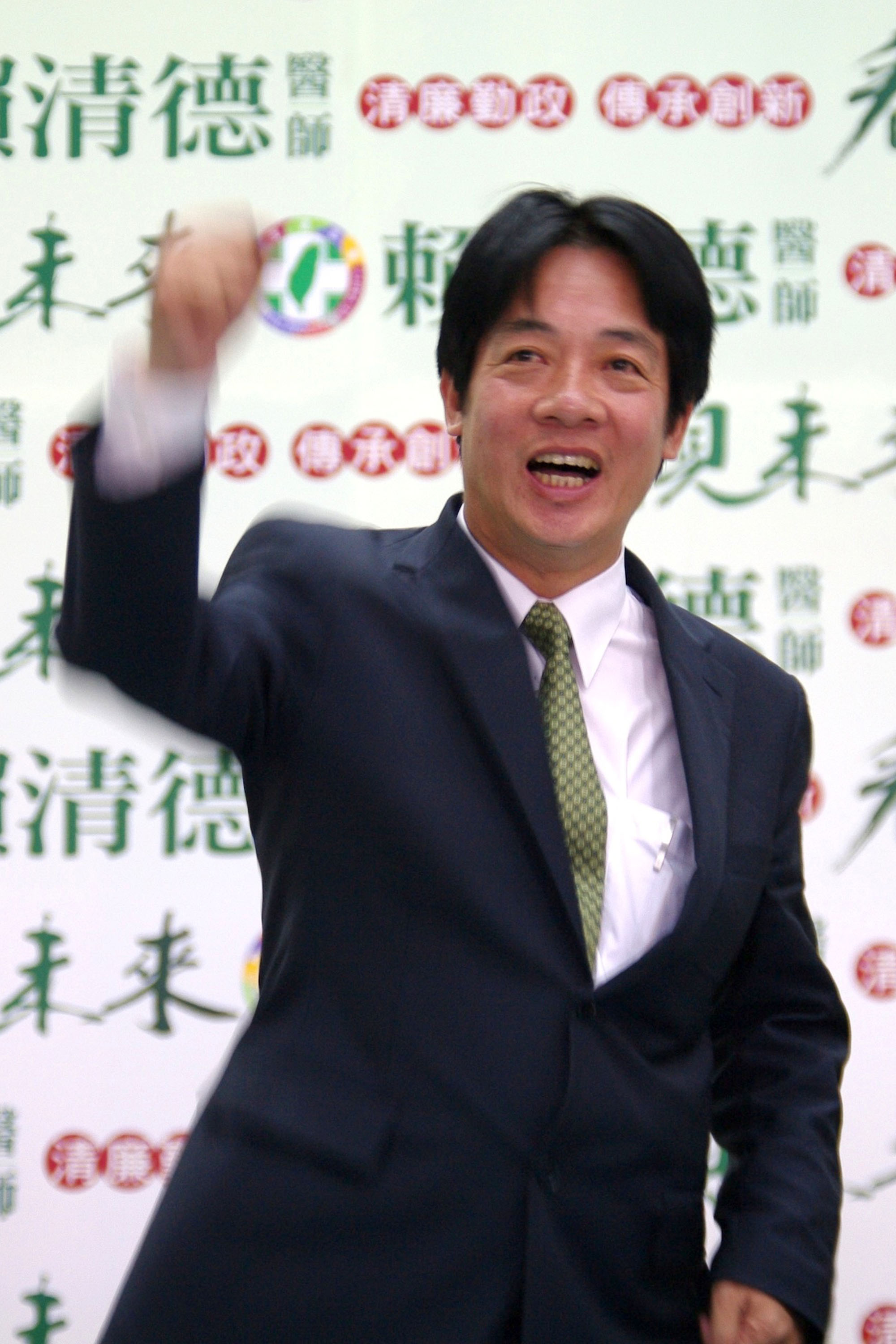
William Lai Ching-te

Poll source	Date of completion	William Lai Ching-te	Kuo Tien-tsai	Undecided
TVBS	May 20, 2010	59%	22%	19%
TVBS	July 27, 2010	53%	25%	22%
Era Television	August 17, 2010	47.7%	18.9%	33.4%
I-tel Research	August 27, 2010	67.21%	32.79%	—
TVBS	August 31, 2010	53%	25%	21%
I-tel Research	September 13, 2010	75.42%	24.58%	—
China Times	September 18, 2010	52%	21%	27%
United Daily News	September 29, 2010	44%	20%	33%
I-tel Research	September 30, 2010	66.43%	33.57%	—
TVBS	October 13, 2010	50%	28%	22%
Shih Hsin University	October 16, 2010	36.2%	23.3%	40.5%
Liberty Times	October 23, 2010	44.07%	16.73%	39.2%
United Daily News	October 29, 2010	48%	24%	28%
China Times	October 29, 2010	52%	23%	25%
TVBS	November 4, 2010	47%	34%	18%
Shih Hsin University	November 13, 2010	37.7%	22.0%	40.3%
Democratic Progressive Party	November 13, 2010	51.3%	25.9%	22.8%

=== Predictions ===
Source	Date of release	Voter turnout	William Lai Ching-te	Kuo Tien-tsai
TVBS	August 31, 2010	67%	64%	36%
I-tel Research	October 4, 2010	—	66.79%	33.21%
United Daily News	October 29, 2010	—	58%	42%
TVBS	November 4, 2010	71%	56%	44%
Global Views	November 27, 2010	61.7%	62.5%	37.5%

=== Results ===
==== Municipal Mayoral Election ====
Party	#	Candidate	Votes	Percentage
Democratic Progressive Party	2	William Lai Ching-te (賴清德)	619,897	60.41%
Kuomintang	1	Kuo Tien-tsai (郭添財)	406,196	39.59%
Total			1,026,093	100.00%
Voter turnout			71.01%	

==== Municipal Councilmen Election ====
Party	Votes	Percentage	Seats
Democratic Progressive Party	378,139	37.01%	27
Kuomintang	288,861	28.27%	13
People First Party	5,774	0.57%	0
New Party	810	0.08%	0
Taiwan Solidarity Union	4,701	0.46%	0
Taiwan Public Opinion Party	138	0.01%	0
Independent	343,300	33.60%	17
Total	1,021,723	100.00%	57
Voter turnout	71.09%		

==== Ward Chiefs Election ====
Party	Votes	Percentage	Seats
Kuomintang	191,288	19.56%	124
Democratic Progressive Party	69,780	7.13%	40
Independent	717,077	73.31%	588
Total	978,145	100.00%	752
Voter turnout	71.17%		

== Kaohsiung ==
=== Electoral background ===
Results of Past Kaohsiung Municipal Mayoral Elections
Year	Winning Candidate	Political Party
1994	Wu Den-yih	Kuomintang
1998	Frank Hsieh Chang-ting	Democratic Progressive Party
2002	Frank Hsieh Chang-ting	Democratic Progressive Party
2006	Chen Chu	Democratic Progressive Party

Results of Past Kaohsiung County Magistrate Elections
Year	Winning Candidate	Political Party
1989	Yu Chen Yueh-ying	Democratic Progressive Party
1993	Yu Cheng-hsien	Democratic Progressive Party
1997	Yu Cheng-hsien	Democratic Progressive Party
2001	Yang Chiu-hsing	Democratic Progressive Party
2005	Yang Chiu-hsing	Democratic Progressive Party

The newly created central municipality Kaohsiung will be formed from the merging of Kaohsiung County and the current central municipality Kaohsiung City. The incumbent Kaohsiung Municipal Mayor Chen Chu and the incumbent Kaohsiung County Magistrate Yang Chiu-hsing are both members of the Democratic Progressive Party. Having been under the administration of the Democratic Progressive Party for the past twelve years, the electoral composition of Kaohsiung City has a slight overall inclination towards the Pan-Green political camp. On the other hand, Kaohsiung County has been under the control of Tangwai members and the Democratic Progressive Party for 25 years, is widely considered to be solidly in the Pan-Green political camp. It is estimated that in Kaohsiung County, approximately 60% of voters who identify themselves with political inclination support the Pan-Green Coalition, whilst 40% support the Pan-Blue Coalition.

=== Polling ===
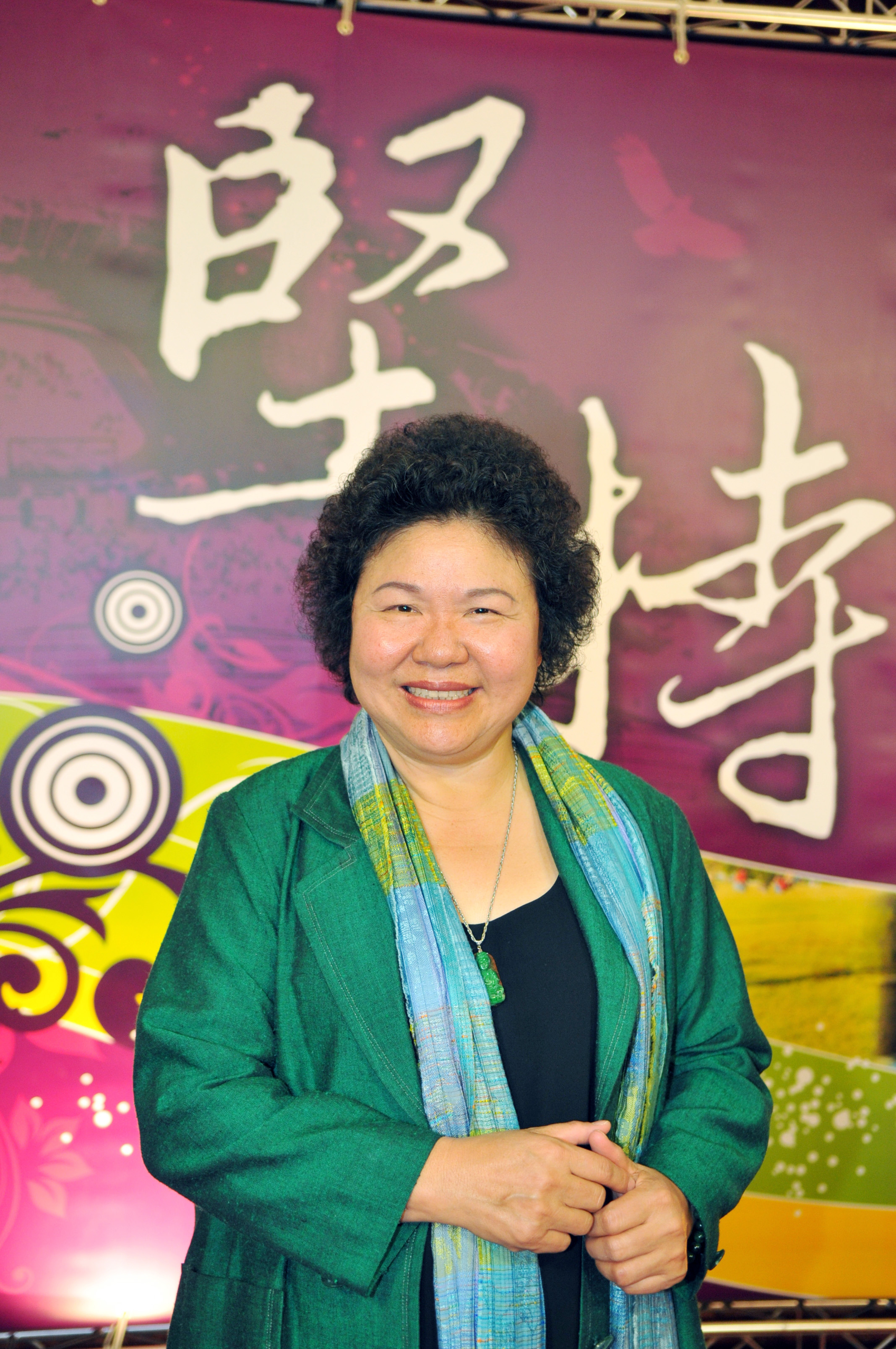
Chen Chu

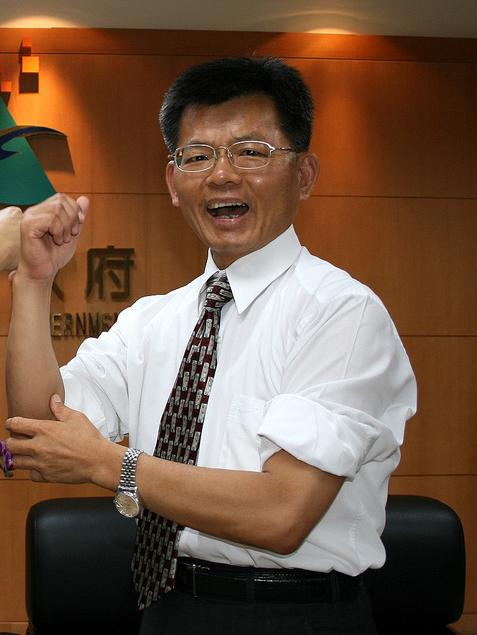
Yang Chiu-hsing

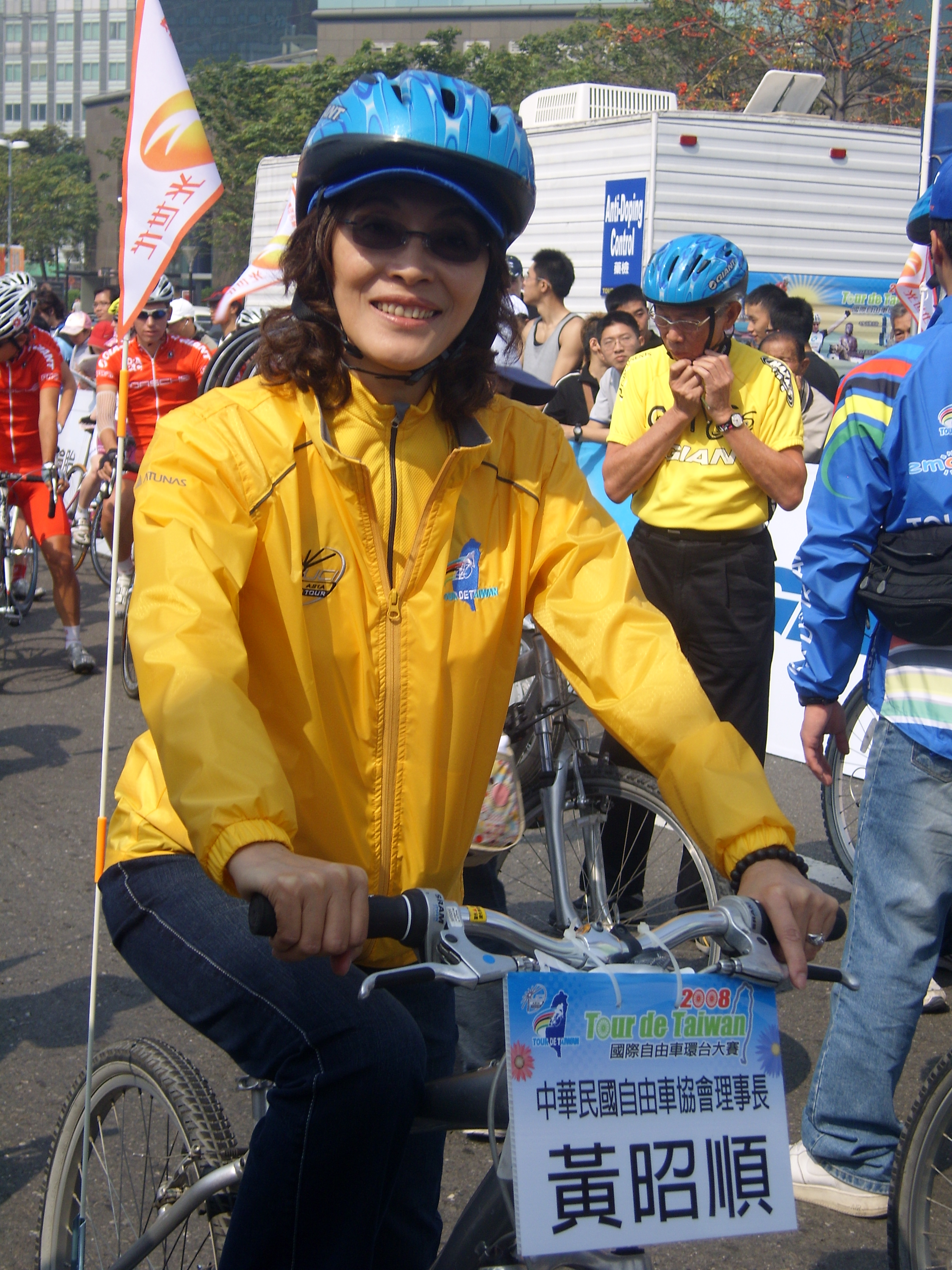
Huang Chao-shun

Poll source	Date of completion	Chen Chu	Yang Chiu-hsing	Huang Chao-shun	Undecided
TVBS	May 27, 2010	62%	—	26%	12%
Era Television	July 13, 2010	45.4%	25.4%	11.7%	17.5%
TVBS	July 29, 2010	43%	26%	16%	15%
Apple Daily	August 3, 2010	43.75%	27.18%	20.49%	8.58%
Era Television	August 3, 2010	43.6%	23.8%	11.5%	21.2%
United Daily News	August 4, 2010	44%	23%	13%	19%
Democratic Progressive Party	August 9, 2010	53.7%	22.6%	15.3%	8.4%
TVBS	August 10, 2010	46%	28%	14%	12%
I-tel Research	August 16, 2010	54.35%	36.96%	8.70%	—
Liberty Times	August 18, 2010	46%	19%	7%	28%
I-tel Research	August 31, 2010	48.36%	20.49%	31.15%	—
TVBS	September 2, 2010	46%	22%	16%	16%
I-tel Research	September 17, 2010	56.45%	25.81%	17.74%	—
China Times	September 18, 2010	45.5%	20.2%	14.9%	19.3%
Apple Daily	September 23, 2010	36.39%	24.60%	18.05%	20.96%
United Daily News	September 26, 2010	37%	24%	14%	23%
Democratic Progressive Party	September 27, 2010	46.0%	26.3%	12.4%	15.3%
TVBS	September 28, 2010	42%	21%	18%	19%
The Commons Daily	September 29, 2010	31.7%	18.8%	7.3%	42.4%
Apple Daily	September 29, 2010	38.30%	22.48%	19.61%	19.61%
China Times	September 30, 2010	42.8%	21.1%	13.8%	22.3%
Democratic Progressive Party	October 12, 2010	47.0%	21.7%	14.8%	16.5%
Shih Hsin University	October 14, 2010	31.7%	20.6%	15.2%	32.5%
TVBS	October 25, 2010	43%	26%	16%	15%
China Times	October 28, 2010	47.1%	23.4%	10.3%	19.2%
Liberty Times	October 30, 2010	43.27%	18.52%	7.8%	30.41%
United Daily News	October 31, 2010	39%	29%	16%	16%
TVBS	November 7, 2010	41%	28%	16%	15%
Democratic Progressive Party	November 9, 2010	47.2%	25.6%	12.5%	14.7%
Shih Hsin University	November 11, 2010	34.1%	18.2%	15.3%	32.4%
Liberty Times	November 15, 2010	45.03%	16.76%	11.51%	26.37%
China Times	November 15, 2010	46.0%	24.0%	13.7%	16.3%

=== Predictions ===
Source	Date of release	Voter turnout	Chen Chu	Yang Chiu-hsing	Huang Chao-shun
TVBS	September 2, 2010	72%	52%	26%	22%
I-tel Research	October 4, 2010	—	52.74%	25.34%	21.92%
TVBS	October 25, 2010	74%	46%	31%	23%
United Daily News	October 31, 2010	—	44%	35%	21%
TVBS	November 7, 2010	73%	45%	33%	21%
Kuomintang	November 15, 2010	—	41.52%	27.68%	30.80%
Global Views	November 27, 2010	69.7%	55.6%	39.2%	5.2%

=== Results ===
==== Municipal Mayoral Election ====
Party	#	Candidate	Votes	Percentage
Democratic Progressive Party	3	Chen Chu (陳菊)	821,089	52.80%
Independent	1	Yang Chiu-hsing (楊秋興)	414,950	26.68%
Kuomintang	2	Huang Chao-shun (黃昭順)	319,171	20.52%
Total			1,555,210	100.00%
Voter turnout			72.52%	

==== Municipal Councilmen Election ====
Party	Votes	Percentage	Seats
Kuomintang	601,083	39.08%	29
Democratic Progressive Party	564,397	36.70%	28
People First Party	30,355	1.97%	1
New Party	1,317	0.09%	0
Taiwan Solidarity Union	27,171	1.77%	0
Independent	313,586	20.39%	8
Total	1,537,889	100.00%	66
Voter turnout	72.60%		

==== Ward Chiefs Election ====
Party	Votes	Percentage	Seats
Kuomintang	393,136	26.81%	242
Democratic Progressive Party	170,430	11.62%	96
Taiwan Solidarity Union	85	0.01%	0
Independent	902,836	61.56%	555
Total	1,466,487	100.00%	893
Voter turnout	72.72%		

== Implications and reactions ==
A forum entitled "Policy Direction after Five Metropolitan Elections in Taiwan", organized by the Institute for National Policy Research on Monday, November 29, 2010, concluded that although the Kuomintang won three of the five mayoral positions, in terms of the overall votes won, the real victor was in fact the Democratic Progressive Party.

Raymond Burghardt, chairman of the American Institute in Taiwan, said that the way both parties handled the shooting which wounded Sean Lien, son of former vice-president Lien Chan, "was also a sign of political maturity."

Taiwanese political scientist Hsu Yung-ming believed that the elections signalled the era of the new "Four Heavenly Kings" Tsai Ing-wen, Chen Chu, William Lai and Su Jia-chyuan within the Democratic Progressive Party.

== See also ==
- Elections in the Republic of China
