= Wang Jung-chang =

Taiwanese politician

Wang Jung-chang MLY
- 王榮璋
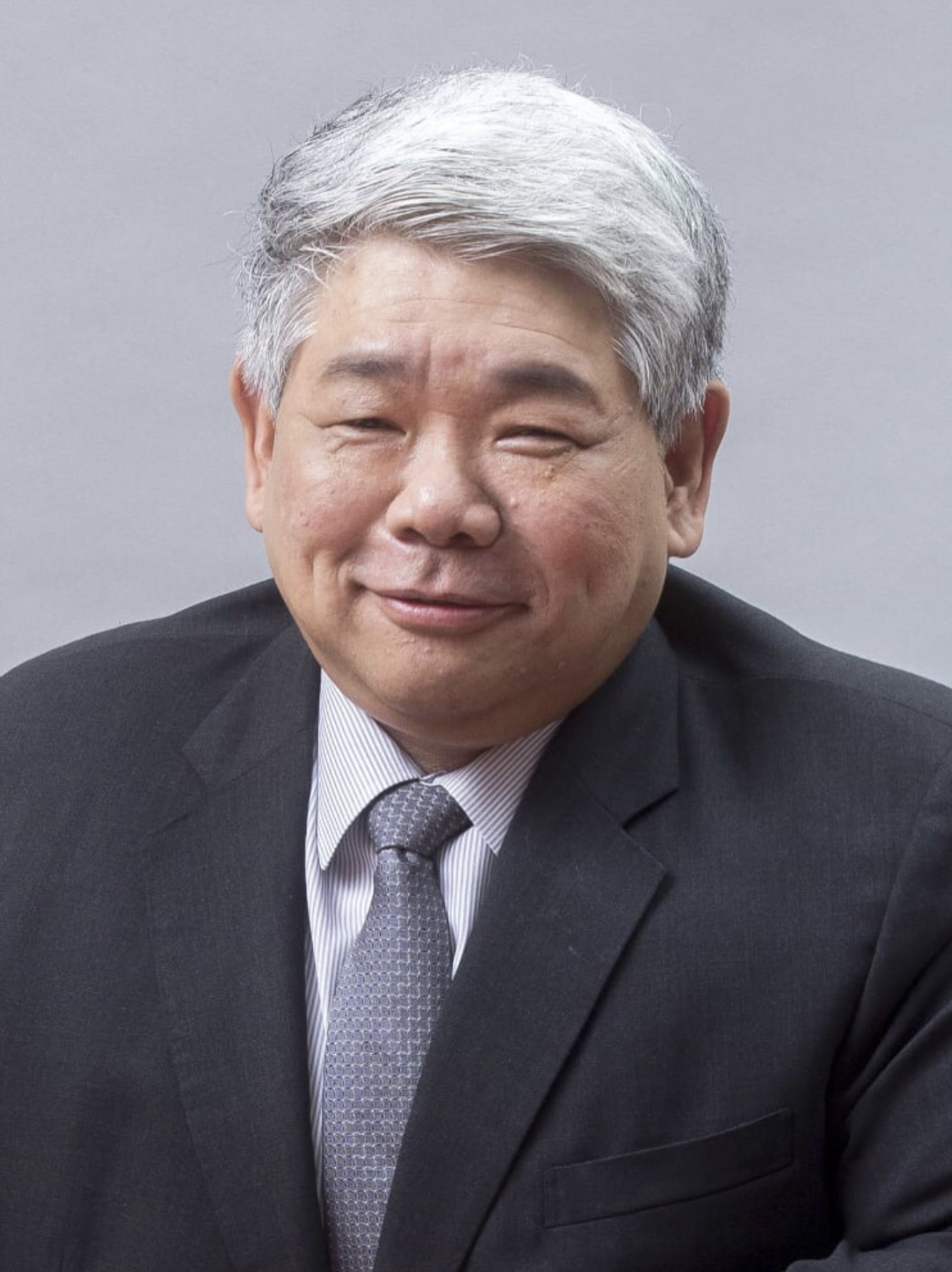
- Official portrait, 2022

Member of the Control Yuan
- Incumbent
- Assumed office 1 August 2020
- CY President: Chen Chu

3rd Vice Chair of the National Human Rights Commission
- In office 1 August 2022 – 31 July 2023
- Chairperson: Chen Chu
- Preceded by: Eugene Jao
- Succeeded by: Tsai Chung-yi

Member of the Legislative Yuan
- In office 1 February 2016 – 31 January 2020
- Constituency: Party-list (Democratic Progressive Party)
- In office 1 February 2005 – 31 January 2008
- Constituency: Party-list (Democratic Progressive Party)

Personal details
- Born: 28 May 1964 (age 61)
- Party: Democratic Progressive Party

Wang Jung-chang (Chinese: 王榮璋; Wade–Giles: Wang^{2} Jung^{2}-chang^{1}; born 28 May 1964) is a Taiwanese politician who is a member of the Control Yuan. He previously served in the Legislative Yuan from 2005 to 2008 and again from 2016 to 2020.

== Education ==
Wang graduated from National Kangshan Senior High School in Gangshan District, Kaohsiung.

== Career ==
In the early 2000s, Wang served as secretary general of the League of Welfare Organizations for the Disabled and was the spokesperson of the Pan-Purple Coalition. From the latter position in 2003, Wang supported Chien Hsi-chieh's presidential campaign. After Chien had left the race, Wang was invited to take part in Taiwan's first televised presidential debate, between Chen Shui-bian and Lien Chan, as one of five questioners.

He was named a Democratic Progressive Party legislative candidate later that year and elected via party list proportional representation. Two months after taking office, Wang advocated for the government to investigate the amount of mercury used in imported batteries from elsewhere in Asia. As a legislator, Wang also continued advocating for the rights of people with disabilities. He accused Fubon Securities of discrimination against a person with hearing loss in 2006, and protested police actions in an arrest of a person with mental disabilities in 2007. Following the incident, Wang worked to pass amendments to the Mental Health Act relating to care and medical treatment of people with mental disabilities.

Wang stepped down at the end of his legislative term in January 2008 and later that year, became the secretary general for the League of Social Welfare Organizations in Taiwan. Between June 2008 and December 2009, Wang was a member of the Executive Yuan Tax Reform Committee. By 2010, Wang was leading the Alliance for Fair Tax Reform. While with the group, Wang criticized the Council of Labor Affairs for spending money on nonessential acquisitions in the midst of budget cuts. After Control Yuan President Wang Chien-shien stated in 2010 that students who work while studying at university were "stupid," Wang Jung-chang challenged him to help keep tuition costs down and lessen economic inequality. The next year, Wang drew attention to Taiwan's increasing budget deficit. He was considered for a position on the Democratic Progressive Party list prior to the January 2012 legislative elections. The Ministry of Finance invited Wang to participate in a task force considering taxation and finance issues in March 2012. He stated that the finance ministry's 2012 bill to reform security gains tax benefited the rich over the poor and made it difficult to consider other tax reform. Wang also resumed his position with the League of Welfare Organizations for the Disabled. In 2013, he brought attention to a case of discrimination on the basis of disability, when police were called to escort a woman with Down syndrome out of a McDonald's restaurant in Kaohsiung. After this incident, Wang pushed for Taiwan to formally sign the Convention on the Rights of Persons with Disabilities.

Wang served as an advisor to Wellington Koo's 2014 Taipei mayoral campaign. He opposed a 2015 proposal to cut Taiwan's transaction tax rate, stating that the cut would increase economic inequality. Wang called for pension reform instead, supporting extensive and centralized review of the system, stating that without such a review, the separate pension funds would go bankrupt in the coming decades. He was placed on the proportional representation ballot for the second time in 2015, and returned to the Legislative Yuan. Wang signed on in support of a 2016 amendment to the Act of Gender Equality in Employment, which made it possible for both married and unmarried parents to claim family leave. He suggested that retirement age for Taiwanese schoolteachers be raised to 65 later that year, and drew criticism from the National Federation of Education Unions. Wang was named to the Legislative Yuan Finance Committee in September 2016, and retained his position in February 2017.

In June 2020, Wang was nominated by the Tsai Ing-wen presidential administration to serve on the Control Yuan. He was also to serve on the National Human Rights Commission. Despite Kuomintang opposition to the number of Pan-Green nominees, all 26 nominations were confirmed.
