= Chien Hsi-chieh =

Taiwanese politician (born 1947)

Chien Hsi-chieh MLY
- 簡錫堦
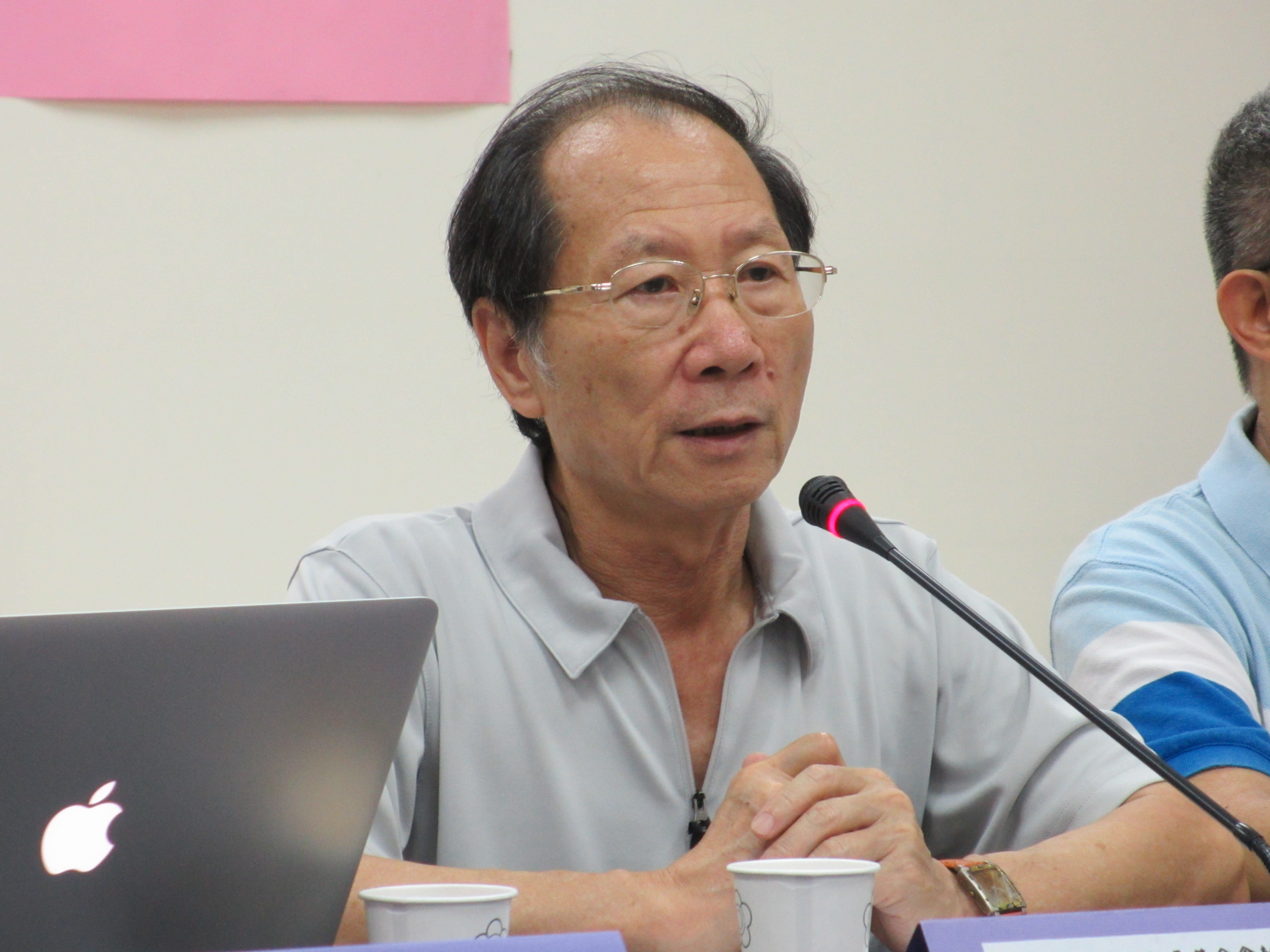
- Chien in July 2013

Member of the Legislative Yuan
- In office 1 February 1996 – 31 January 2002
- Constituency: Republic of China

Personal details
- Born: 15 March 1947 (age 79)
- Party: Alliance of Fairness and Justice
- Other political affiliations: Democratic Progressive Party
- Education: Aletheia University (BS)

Chien Hsi-chieh (Chinese: 簡錫堦; Pe̍h-ōe-jī: Kán Sek-kai; born 15 March 1947) is a Taiwanese politician who served in the Legislative Yuan from 1996 to 2002 as a member of the Democratic Progressive Party. He later founded the Alliance of Fairness and Justice.

== Early career and activism ==
Chien graduated from the Provincial Chunghua Commerce and Vocational High School and then graduated from Tamsui Technical and Commercial College with a degree in engineering. He became active in the tangwai movement after the Kaohsiung Incident as a journalist and cartoonist. He and Chiou I-jen co-founded the Taiwan Labor Legal Support Group in 1984, which was later renamed the Taiwan Labor Front, an organization that Chien served as president before his election to the legislature.

== Political career ==
Chien was elected to two terms as a member of the Legislative Yuan and served from 1996 to 2002. A legislative representative of the Democratic Progressive Party, Chien belonged to its New Tide faction. In 1999, he worked to pass stronger legislation protecting conscientious objection to military service on religious grounds after the Judicial Yuan ruled that such reasoning was not sufficient to refuse conscription. Chen spoke out against black gold politics later that year, citing data collected by the National Police Agency. In 2000, Chien was attacked by Lo Fu-chu and Lin Ming-yi. Lo later gained a reputation for using violence on the legislative floor.

After stepping down from the legislature in 2002, Chien became leader of the Peacetime Foundation. Through the foundation, Chien advocates peace on both sides of the Taiwan Strait, leading to a formally independent Taiwan, negotiation with Chinese civic groups on Cross-Strait issues, and organizes the Peace Film Festival. Chien founded the Alliance of Fairness and Justice, also known as the Pan-Purple Coalition, on 10 August 2003 and announced that he would represent the coalition of social groups as its presidential candidate in the 2004 elections, but soon left the race. Since leaving office, Chien has supported many social causes and initiatives. Among them are judicial reform and tax reform, as well as workers' rights. Chien has also called for the government to fund programs that would raise Taiwan's birth rate. In 2005, he pushed the Chen Shui-bian administration to adopt less demeaning Chinese translations of the words "Jew" and "Islam". The next year, Chien helped lead the Million Voices Against Corruption, President Chen Must Go campaign alongside Shih Ming-teh.

Chien later joined the Alliance for Fair Tax Reform to serve as its spokesman, leaving the group to establish the Anti-Poverty Alliance. Led by Chien, members of the Anti-Poverty Alliance held two hunger strikes in October 2011 to raise awareness of economic inequality in Taiwan. In 2012, Chien, representing the Anti-Poverty Alliance, was named to the Executive Yuan Tax Reform Committee alongside Wang Jung-chang of the Alliance for Fair Tax Reform. Chien and Wang had previously worked together prior to this as members of the Pan-Purple Collation. Additionally, both were members of an earlier convocation of the Tax Reform Committee which met from June 2008 to December 2009. Chien published a book, Power of the Weak in 2015. In it he advocated for the government to adopt nonviolent civil resistance as part of a strategy for national defense. Chien's Anti-Poverty Alliance supported third force political candidates in the 2016 elections, the most successful of which belonged to the New Power Party.

== Political stances ==
Chien's opinion pieces appear frequently in the Taipei Times. His editorials for the publication have discussed Taiwan's participation in the International Criminal Court and the 2011 food scandal. Chien has also written repeatedly on the merits of nonviolent civil resistance, a topic on which he published a book in 2015. The Taipei Times has also published Chien's writing on economic inequality and tax reform.
