= Chen Chu =

Taiwanese politician (born 1950)

- 陳菊
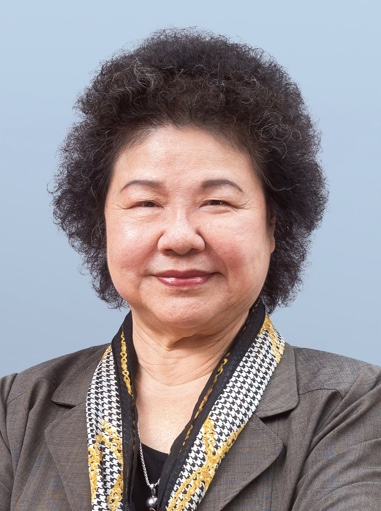
- Official portrait, 2020

10th President of the Control Yuan
- In office 1 August 2020 – 31 January 2026 (Note: On medical leave from 10 February 2025 to 31 January 2026, Vice President Lee Hung-chun took over the duties of the President of the Control Yuan during her absence.)
- Appointed by: Tsai Ing-wen
- Vice President: Lee Hung-chun
- Preceded by: Chang Po-ya
- Succeeded by: Lee Hung-chun

1st Chairperson of the National Human Rights Commission
- In office 1 August 2020 – 31 January 2026 (Note: On medical leave since 10 February 2025, Vice Chairwoman Wang Yu-ling and Chi Huey-rong took over the duties of the chairwoman during her absence.)
- Deputy: See list: Kao Yung-cheng Eugene Jao Wang Jung-chang Tsai Chung-yi Wang Yu-ling
- Preceded by: Position established
- Succeeded by: Wang Yu-ling (acting)

35th Secretary-General to the President
- In office 23 April 2018 – 20 May 2020
- President: Tsai Ing-wen
- Deputy: Liu Chien-sin; Lee Chun-yi
- Preceded by: Liu Chien-sin (acting)
- Succeeded by: Su Jia-chyuan

1st (Note: Chen was elected before and after the merge of the Kaohsiung City and Kaohsiung County. She was the 3rd Mayor of Kaohsiung City (before) and 1st Mayor of Kaohsiung (after).) Mayor of Kaohsiung
- In office 25 December 2006 – 20 April 2018
- Deputy: See list: Cheng Wen-lon Chiu Tai-san Lin Ren-yih Lee Yung-te Chen Chi-yu Liu Shyh-fang Wu Hong-mo Chen Chin-te Hsu Li-ming Shih Che Yang Ming-jou
- Preceded by: Yeh Chu-lan (acting); Yang Chiu-hsing (Note: as the Magistrate of the Kaohsiung County that was merged into Kaohsiung City in 2010.)
- Succeeded by: Hsu Li-ming (acting)

Chair of the Democratic Progressive Party
- Acting; 29 February 2012 – 30 May 2012
- Preceded by: Tsai Ing-wen
- Succeeded by: Su Tseng-chang

6th Minister of Labor
- In office 20 May 2000 – 19 September 2005
- Prime Minister: Tang Fei; Chang Chun-hsiung; Yu Shyi-kun; Frank Hsieh
- Preceded by: Chan Huo-shen
- Succeeded by: Lee Ying-yuan

Personal details
- Born: 10 June 1950 (age 76) Sanxing, Luodong, Taipei County, Taiwan
- Party: Democratic Progressive Party (1986–present) (Note: Membership suspended since 2020 during the tenure as the President of Control Yuan)
- Other political affiliations: Chinese Youth Party (1969–1979)
- Relatives: Lee Kun-tse (nephew)
- Education: Shih Hsin University (BA, MA); National Sun Yat-sen University (MPA)

Chen Chu (Chinese: 陳菊; pinyin: Chén Jú; Wade–Giles: Ch'en^{²} Chü^{²}; Pe̍h-ōe-jī: Tân Kiok; born 10 June 1950), also known as Kiku Chen or Joyce Chen, is a Taiwanese politician serving as president of the Control Yuan and chairwoman of the National Human Rights Commission since 2020. Before assuming her current post, Chen had served as Secretary-General to the President from 2018 to 2020 and Mayor of Kaohsiung from 2006 to 2018, making her the longest-serving mayor of the city since the Japanese occupation of Taiwan. Prior to her entrance into politics, Chen was one of the eight prominent dissidents in the Kaohsiung Incident arrested and charged in 1979. She was a political prisoner for almost six years during the martial law period in Taiwan.

Chen had also served in various capacities with the Taipei and Kaohsiung city governments between 1995 and 2000, with the latter being the year when she graduated from the National Sun Yat-sen University (NSYSU) with a master's degree in public affairs. She then served as Minister of the Council of Labor Affairs, the precursor to present-day Ministry of Labor, in various cabinets between 2000 and 2005. Chen won the 2006 Kaohsiung mayoral election and became the Republic of China's first directly-elected female mayor of a special municipality. She was twice reelected in 2010 and 2014 with about 53% and 68% of the votes respectively.

Nearly a month after she tendered her resignation from the role of Secretary-General to the President, President Tsai Ing-wen nominated Chen, who supports abolishing altogether the Examination Yuan and Control Yuan, as the next President of the Control Yuan on 22 June 2020 amid dissent from the opposition. Legislative Yuan confirmed the nomination in a 65-3 vote after days of violence in the chamber. Lawmakers from the Kuomintang and the Taiwan People's Party boycotted the vote whereas all New Power Party lawmakers cast their dissent votes.

The Democratic Progressive Party, which Chen helped to found, temporarily suspended her membership during her tenure as President of the Control Yuan according to party rules. Chen had expressed hopes of becoming the last President of the Control Yuan after helping to secure passage of the amendments to the Constitution.

== Early life and education ==
Chu was born on June 10, 1950, in Sanxing. She was the second child in a family of five children. After graduating from Taiwan Provincial Yilan County Toucheng Middle School, she studied library science as an undergraduate at Shih Hsin University and obtained a bachelor's degree in 1968 and a master's degree in social development from the university. In 2001, she earned a Master of Public Affairs (M.P.A.) from National Sun Yat-sen University.

== Kaohsiung mayoralty ==
=== 2006 Kaohsiung mayoral election ===
Chen narrowly defeated the Kuomintang candidate Huang Jun-ying with a margin of just 1,120 votes in the 2006 Kaohsiung mayoral election. After announcement of the election result, Huang filed two lawsuits against Chen's campaign team, requesting the court to annul the election. He argued airing of a video, produced by Chen's campaign team, on the eve of the election resulted in his loss. The Kaohsiung District Court ruled in favor of Huang in one of the lawsuits, thus nullifying the election.

Chen expressed her intention to appeal to the court upon knowing the verdict. She claimed it would be a political suicide if she accepted the ruling. While her colleague and Democratic Progressive Party legislator Kuan Bi-ling advised Chen to concede, Chen nonetheless appealed the ruling. There were speculations on whether Kuan, who lost to Chen during the primaries, made the remark out of personal interest.

The High Court eventually overturned the earlier decision of the Kaohsiung District Court and revalidated the election result on 17 November 2007. Chen announced, after all legal proceedings against the mayoral election result had ended, that her policy priorities would be the city's transportation, infrastructure construction and environmental protection.

2006 Kaohsiung mayoral election result
No	Candidate	Party	Votes	%
1	Huang Jun-ying		378,303	49.27%
2	Lin Chi-sheng (林志昇)		1,746	0.23%
3	Lo Chih-ming		6,599	0.86%
4	Lin Ching-yuan (林景元)		1,803	0.23%
5	Chen Chu		379,417	49.41%

=== Chienchen River cleanup ===
Chen assured the public in April 2009 she would improve the water quality of Chienchen River, nicknamed "Heilungchiang" by the locals for its apparent pollution. She pledged NT$120 million to implement the water treatment project. Chen vowed to make Kaohsiung a city not just notable for the beauty of the Love River.

=== 2009 World Games ===
Kaohsiung was the host city of 2009 World Games. Chen visited China in that year to promote the Games and met with then-Mayor of Beijing Guo Jinlong. Chen addressed then-President Ma Ying-jeou with his formal title during the meeting with Guo, which garnered much support from her party and the Kaohsiung City Council. However, she was criticized by several Taiwanese localist groups, including the Taiwan Solidarity Union. In response, Chen said the trip was meant to be beneficial to Kaohsiung. In addition to Guo, she also met with then-Mayor of Shanghai Han Zheng and former Chinese Olympic Committee chairman Liu Pong during her trip to China.

The main venue of the games, the World Games Stadium, was designed by Japanese architect Toyo Ito. Both the groundbreaking and completion of the Stadium occurred during Chen's tenure of mayorship.

The closing ceremony was held in the sold-out World Games Stadium, where President of the International World Games Association Ron Froehlich called the Games a "fantastic success" and declared it "the best ever". Tourism Bureau of Kaohsiung announced the Games generated nearly US$61 million in revenue for the city. The city's department stores reported a 15-percent growth in sales. Chen said Kaohsiung would no longer be known only as the second largest city in Taiwan, but also the one that hosted the best World Games ever.

=== Typhoon Fanapi ===
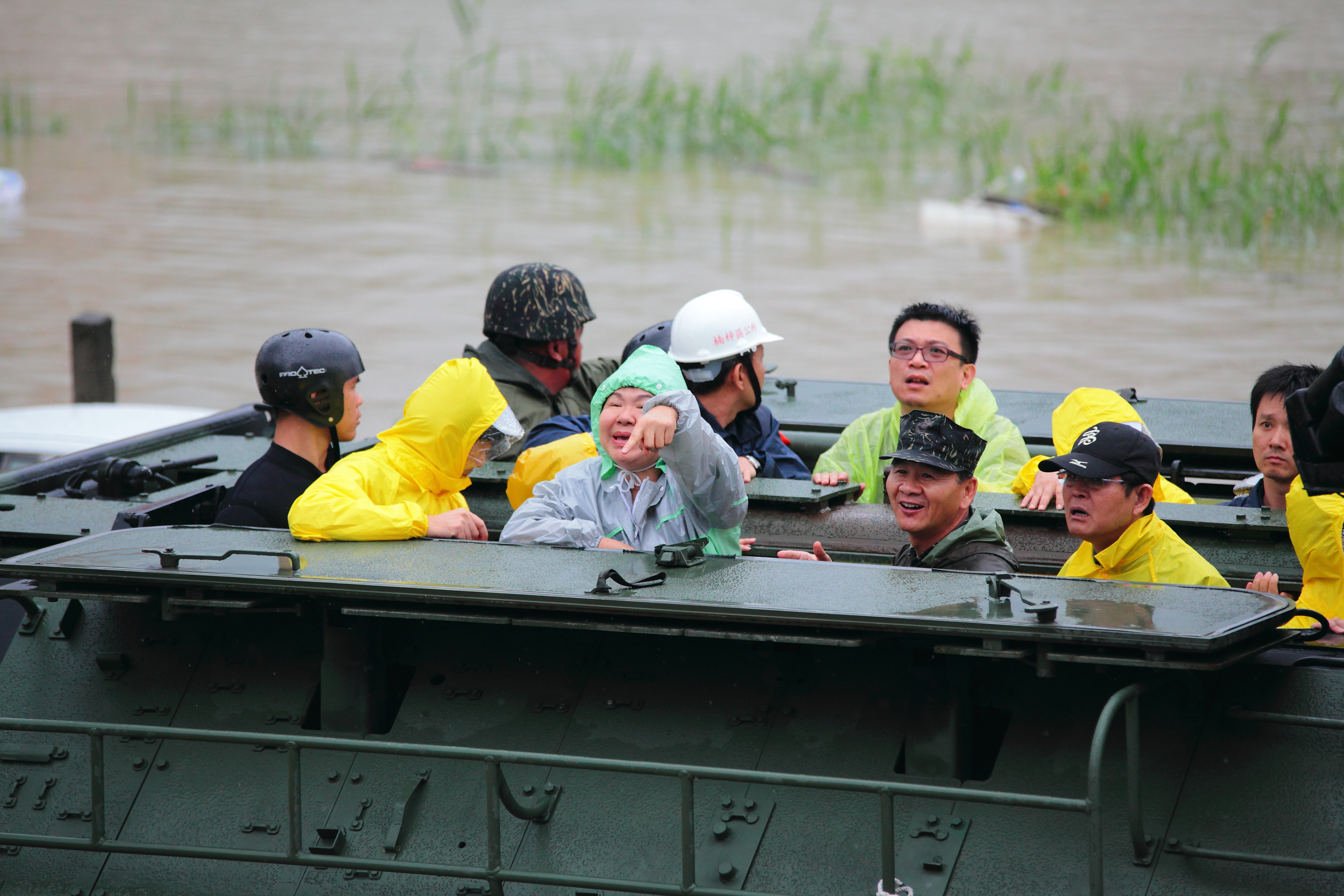
Chen riding on a R.O.C. Marine Corps' AAV-7A1 during her Typhoon Fanapi rescue efforts.

Chen was criticized for having a nap in her residence while many parts of Kaohsiung were flooded during Typhoon Fanapi on 19 September 2010.

Chen tearfully apologized, saying she felt guilty for taking a rest. Stressing that she returned to her residence to change her wet clothes, Chen indicated she was also keeping a close eye on the rainstorm. Critics called for her immediate resignation and compared Chen's behaviour to then-Premier Liu Chao-shiuan's haircut and then-Secretary-General of the Executive Yuan Hsieh Hsiang-chuan's attendance at a Father's Day dinner during Typhoon Morakot in August 2009.

Chen and the Kaohsiung City Government were sued by Lin Chi-mei, a fellow party member and local official from Benhe Village, in the aftermath of the flooding. She alleged the local government did not maintain properly the flood control facilities.

=== 2010 Kaohsiung mayoral election ===
Chen was running against the Kuomintang candidate Huang Chao-shun and independent candidate Yang Chiu-hsing in her first reelection campaign. She won the 2010 Kaohsiung mayoral election with 52.80% of the votes. This was the first Kaohsiung mayoral election held after the city became a special municipality under the Local Government Act, which also paved the way for the merger of Kaohsiung City and Kaohsiung County.

2010 Kaohsiung mayoral election result
Party	#	Candidate	Votes	Percentage
Democratic Progressive Party	3	Chen Chu	821,089	52.80%
Independent	1	Yang Chiu-hsing	414,950	26.68%
Kuomintang	2	Huang Chao-shun	319,171	20.52%
Total			1,555,210	100.00%
Voter turnout			72.52%	

=== 2014 gas explosions ===
Kaohsiung residents criticized Chen for taking an apathetic attitude in the 2014 Kaohsiung gas explosions. The Kuomintang caucus in the Kaohsiung City Council sued her for negligence which led to casualties. A subpoena was issued to Chen and three other municipal officials on 22 September 2014. The Kaohsiung District Prosecutors' Office decided on 18 December 2014 not to indict Chen.

=== 2014 Kaohsiung mayoral election ===
Chen launched her second reelection campaign in 2014 and defeated the Kuomintang candidate Yang Chiu-hsing in the mayoral election, held on 29 November 2014, with 68.09% of the votes.

2014 Kaohsiung mayoral election result
No.	Candidate	Party	Votes	Percentage
1	Chou Ko-sheng	Independent	14,925	1.02%
2	Chen Chu	DPP	993,300	68.09%
3	Yang Chiu-hsing	KMT	450,647	30.89%

== Notes ==
Government offices
Preceded by Chan Huo-shen	Minister of the Council of Labor Affairs; 2000-2005	Succeeded by Lee Ying-yuan
Preceded by Yeh Chu-lan (acting)	Mayor of Kaohsiung; 2006–2018	Succeeded by Hsu Li-ming (acting)
Preceded by Liu Chien-sin (acting)	Secretary-General to the President; 2018–2020	Succeeded by Su Jia-chyuan
Preceded by Chang Po-ya	President of the Control Yuan; 2020–2026	Succeeded by Lee Hung-chun
Preceded by New office	Chair of the National Human Rights Commission; 2020–2026	Succeeded by Wang Yu-ling (acting)
Party political offices
Preceded by Tsai Ing-wen	Chairwoman of the Democratic Progressive Party; Acting; 2012	Succeeded by Su Tseng-chang
