= Eugene Jao =

Taiwanese politician (born 1957)

Jao Yung-ching MLY
- 趙永清
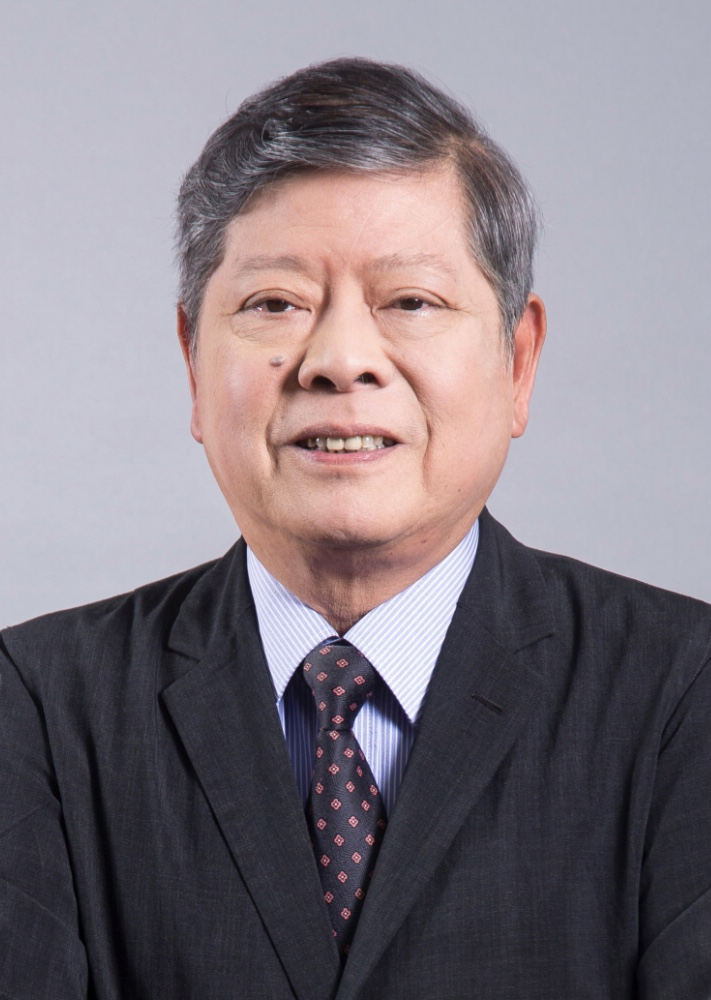
- Official portrait, 2021

Member of the Control Yuan
- Incumbent
- Assumed office 22 January 2018
- CY President: Chen Chu

2nd Vice Chairperson of the National Human Rights Commission
- In office 1 August 2021 – 31 July 2022
- Chairperson: Chen Chu
- Preceded by: Kao Yung-cheng
- Succeeded by: Wang Jung-chang

Member of the Legislative Yuan
- In office 1 February 1993 – 31 January 2008
- Constituency: Taipei County 3 (1999—2008); Taipei County (1993–1999)

Personal details
- Born: 9 November 1957 (age 68)
- Party: Democratic Progressive Party (since 2002); Kuomintang (until 2000); Independent (2000–2002)
- Education: National Chengchi University (BA); New York University (MA)

Jao Yung-ching (Chinese: 趙永清; born 9 November 1957), also known by his English name Eugene Jao, is a Taiwanese politician. He was a member of the Legislative Yuan between 1993 and 2008. Jao began his political career as a member of the Kuomintang before leaving the party in 2000. He switched affiliations to the Democratic Progressive Party in 2002. He has served on the Control Yuan since 2018.

== Education ==
After graduating from the Affiliated Senior High School of National Taiwan Normal University, Jao earned a Bachelor of Arts (B.A.) in political science from National Chengchi University and a Master of Arts (M.A.) in political science from New York University.

== Political career ==
Jao joined the Kuomintang due to the influence of his father, Jao Chang-chiang, and brother, both senior party members. Jao was first elected to the Legislative Yuan in 1992. In 1996, during Jao's second term, he received repeated death threats from fellow legislator Lo Fu-chu, who opposed anti-corruption bills Jao supported. Jao remained popular entering his third legislative term due to his tendency to challenge his party caucus. In the 1998 election cycle, Jao received the most votes of any candidate in Taipei County. A conflict of interest bill Jao backed as part of his anti-corruption crusade became law in June 2000. Later that year, he joined a task force which discussed the state of Cross-Strait relations in context of the 1992 Consensus. Jao vehemently opposed the activation of the Lungmen Nuclear Power Plant discussed in October. Shortly thereafter, the Kuomintang suspended Jao's membership. Jao subsequently formed an independent legislative caucus, for which the KMT revoked his membership. After spending some time as an independent, Jao began his fourth legislative term as a member of the Democratic Progressive Party caucus. In March 2002, he was named chief executive of a legislative task force called to consider passage of sunshine laws. That July, Jao formally joined the Democratic Progressive Party. During his fifth legislative term, Jao served as DPP caucus whip. In 2006, Jao backed a proposed bill to regulate the Kuomintang's assets. He lost reelection in 2008. The Tsai Ing-wen administration nominated Jao to a seat on the Control Yuan in 2017. He faced interpellation in January 2018 and took office with legislative consent. He was renominated in June 2020. Despite Kuomintang opposition to the number of Pan-Green nominees, all 26 nominations were confirmed.

== Political stances ==
Over the course of his legislative career, Jao has taken an interest in genetically modified food, and food safety. A noted environmentalist, Jao has been active in discussions about energy policy and water use. He is opposed to the use of nuclear power. Jao is also known for his interest in endangered species such as the black-faced spoonbill.

== Controversy ==
Jao was one of five DPP politicians whom Chang Che-shen accused of slander in 2006. Next Magazine first reported in 2007 that Jao had taken bribes from the National Chinese Herbal Apothecary Association in 1998. In January 2008, Jao was one of eight lawmakers charged with taking bribes, from the National Chinese Herbal Apothecary Association in 1998 and the Taiwan Dental Association in 2003, in violation of the Pharmaceutical Affairs Law. The Taipei District Court ruled in 2009 that Jao was not guilty of the charges dating back to 1998. Upon appeal to the Taiwan High Court, Jao was sentenced to eight years imprisonment. His sentence for the charges stemming from 2003 was set at ninety months imprisonment in 2011. The Supreme Court issued the final ruling on the case in 2016, deciding that Jao was not guilty of accepting bribes from the Taiwan Dental Association.
