= Chen Horng-chi =

Taiwanese politician

Chen Horng-chi MLY
- 陳鴻基

Member of the Legislative Yuan
- In office 1 February 1999 – 31 January 2002
- Constituency: Taipei 2
- In office 1 February 1996 – 31 January 1999
- Constituency: Taipei 1

Member of the National Assembly
- In office 1992 – 31 January 1996

Personal details
- Born: 30 September 1950 (age 75) Taiwan
- Party: Taiwan Solidarity Union (since 2002)
- Other political affiliations: Kuomintang (until 2002)
- Education: Tamsui Institute of Industrial and Business Administration (BS); Nihon University (LLB); Kinki University (PhD)

Chen Horng-chi (Chinese: 陳鴻基; pinyin: Chén Hóngjī; born 30 September 1950) is a Taiwanese politician who served as a member National Assembly between 1992 and 1996, when he was seated to the Legislative Yuan. Shortly after stepping down from the legislature in 2002, Chen left the Kuomintang and joined the Taiwan Solidarity Union.

== Education ==
After graduating from the Tamsui Institute of Industrial and Business Administration, Chen went to Japan and studied at Nihon University and then Kinki University, where he received his doctorate in law.

== Political career ==
Chen was elected to the National Assembly in 1991, and to the Legislative Yuan in 1995 and 1998.

He was an ally of Lee Teng-hui, and later led the Generation-E Alliance affiliated with the parties of the Pan-Blue Coalition, namely the Kuomintang and People First Party. Chen was a proponent of reform for the Kuomintang, and was willing to work with the Democratic Progressive Party to resolve questions regarding the Kuomintang's assets. However, he was frequently critical of the DPP, and repeatedly commented on President Chen Shui-bian's ability to build a government. Chen Horng-chi actively pursued the recall of Chen Shui-bian and the resignation of premier Chang Chun-hsiung. As a legislator, Chen maintained an interest in social and medical services. He opposed the legalization of gambling on Taiwan's offshore islands.

For a portion of his second term in office, Chen chaired the Legislative Yuan's Discipline Committee. In February 2001, Chen spoke out against a Kuomintang proposal to form dual party tickets alongside the People First Party for that year's municipal elections. Later it was reported that Chen and fellow members of the Generation-E Alliance were considering withdrawal from the Kuomintang. Chen eventually accepted the Kuomintang nomination to run in Taipei South. During his campaign, Chen called for cooperation with the Democratic Progressive Party. His statement led to continued rumors of party switching and a potential split vote. Chen apologized for the statement but did not retract it, and led a rally to lend further support to the proposed coalition. Chen lost the election, and subsequently joined the Taiwan Solidarity Union in November 2002. Having experience in the Kuomintang's organization department, Chen was named director of the same office within the TSU. He was formally expelled from the Kuomintang in December 2002. By 2003, Chen had become the TSU's deputy secretary general. In June 2004, he was named Taiwan's deputy representative to Japan. Chen took office in October. He considered standing for the 2004 legislative elections, but ended his bid to support David Huang. Lo Koon-tsan joined Chen as a deputy representative to Japan in June 2006. Chen then served as the chairman of the Association of East Asian Relations.

In January 2008, Chen was charged with taking bribes to support amendments to the Pharmaceutical Affairs Law from the National Chinese Herbal Apothecary Association in 1998. The case was heard by the Taipei District Court in 2009, and appealed to the Taiwan High Court in September 2010. Both courts found Chen guilty, but the High Court decision was overruled by the Supreme Court. The retrial was heard by the Taiwan High Court in 2012, and Chen was found not guilty.

== Awards and honors ==
- 2022 Grand Cordon of the Order of the Rising Sun – Japan
