= Cheng Kuei-lien =

Taiwanese politician

- 鄭貴蓮

Member of the Legislative Yuan
- In office 1 February 2002 – 31 January 2005
- Constituency: Republic of China

Personal details
- Born: 25 December 1961 (age 64)
- Party: Democratic Progressive Party
- Spouse: Yu Cheng-hsien
- Education: Soochow University

Cheng Kuei-lien (Chinese: 鄭貴蓮; pinyin: Zhèng Guìlián; born 25 December 1961) is a Taiwanese politician who served in the Legislative Yuan from 2002 to 2005.

== Academic career ==
Cheng attended Soochow University and later taught at Cheng Shiu Institute of Technology.

== Political career ==
She served on the third National Assembly and was elected to the Legislative Yuan in 2001. A 2003 assessment by the Association Monitoring the Nomination of Grand Justices determined that Cheng ranked second-worst at interpellation. In 2004, she referred to Chen Chi-mai and Gao Jyh-peng as "little bastards" and compared the duo to communists, claiming that they had stopped her from running for re-election by supporting other Democratic Progressive Party candidates.

== Personal life ==
Cheng is married to Yu Cheng-hsien.
