= Liu Shyh-fang =

Taiwanese politician

Liu Shyh-fang MLY
- 劉世芳
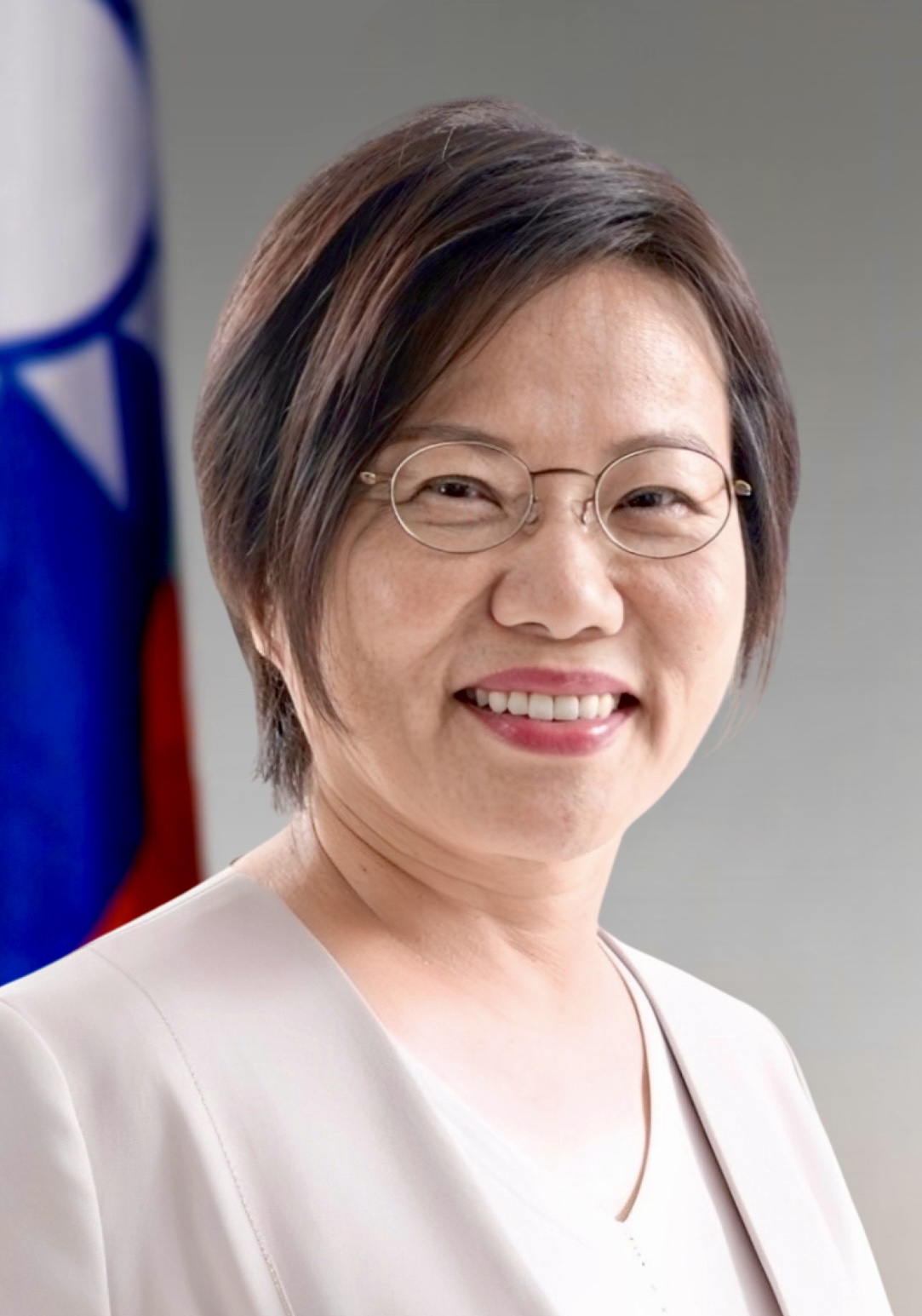
- Official portrait, 2024

35th Minister of the Interior
- Incumbent
- Assumed office 20 May 2024
- Prime Minister: Cho Jung-tai
- Preceded by: Lin Yu-chang

Member of the Legislative Yuan
- In office 1 February 2016 – 31 January 2024
- Preceded by: Huang Chao-shun
- Succeeded by: Lee Po-yee
- Constituency: Kaohsiung 3
- In office 1 February 2002 – 30 June 2002
- Constituency: Party-list
Additional offices
1st Deputy Mayor of Kaohsiung
In office 25 December 2010 – 24 December 2014
Mayor	Chen Chu
Preceded by	Position established
9th Deputy Secretary-General to the President
In office 16 July 2006 – 11 February 2007 Serving with Cho Jung-tai
Secretary General	Mark Chen; Chiou I-jen
Preceded by	Ma Yung-chen
Succeeded by	Chen Chi-mai

22nd Secretary-General of the Executive Yuan
- In office 1 July 2002 – 20 May 2004
- Prime Minister: Yu Shyi-kun
- Preceded by: Lee Ying-yuan
- Succeeded by: Arthur Iap

Personal details
- Born: 13 August 1959 (age 67) Taipei, Taiwan
- Party: Democratic Progressive Party
- Education: Tamkang University (BS); Oklahoma State University (MS); National Taiwan University (MBA)

Liu Shyh-fang (or Liu Shih-fang; Chinese: 劉世芳; pinyin: Liú Shìfāng; born 15 August 1959) is a Taiwanese politician who currently serves as the Minister of the Interior since 2024.

She graduated from the Oklahoma State University and is a member of the Democratic Progressive Party. She was deputy secretary-general of the office of President Chen Shui-bian.

== Education ==
Liu graduated from Tamkang University with a Bachelor of Science (B.S.) in chemical engineering. She then earned a Master of Science (M.S.) in environmental engineering from Oklahoma State University and an M.B.A. from National Taiwan University.

== Interior ministry ==
On 12 April 2024, Liu was appointed to Cho Jung-tai's incoming cabinet as Minister of the Interior.

On 8 January 2026, Liu was sanctioned by the Taiwan Affairs Office of the People's Republic of China as a "diehard "Taiwan independence" separatist" for "blatantly promoting separatist ‘Taiwan independence’ rhetoric", as well as "persecuting mainland spouses in Taiwan and actively creating obstacles to cross-strait personnel exchanges".

== See also ==
- List of members of the ninth Legislative Yuan
