= Huang Chao-shun =

Taiwanese politician (born 1953)

Huang Chao-shun MLY
- 黃昭順
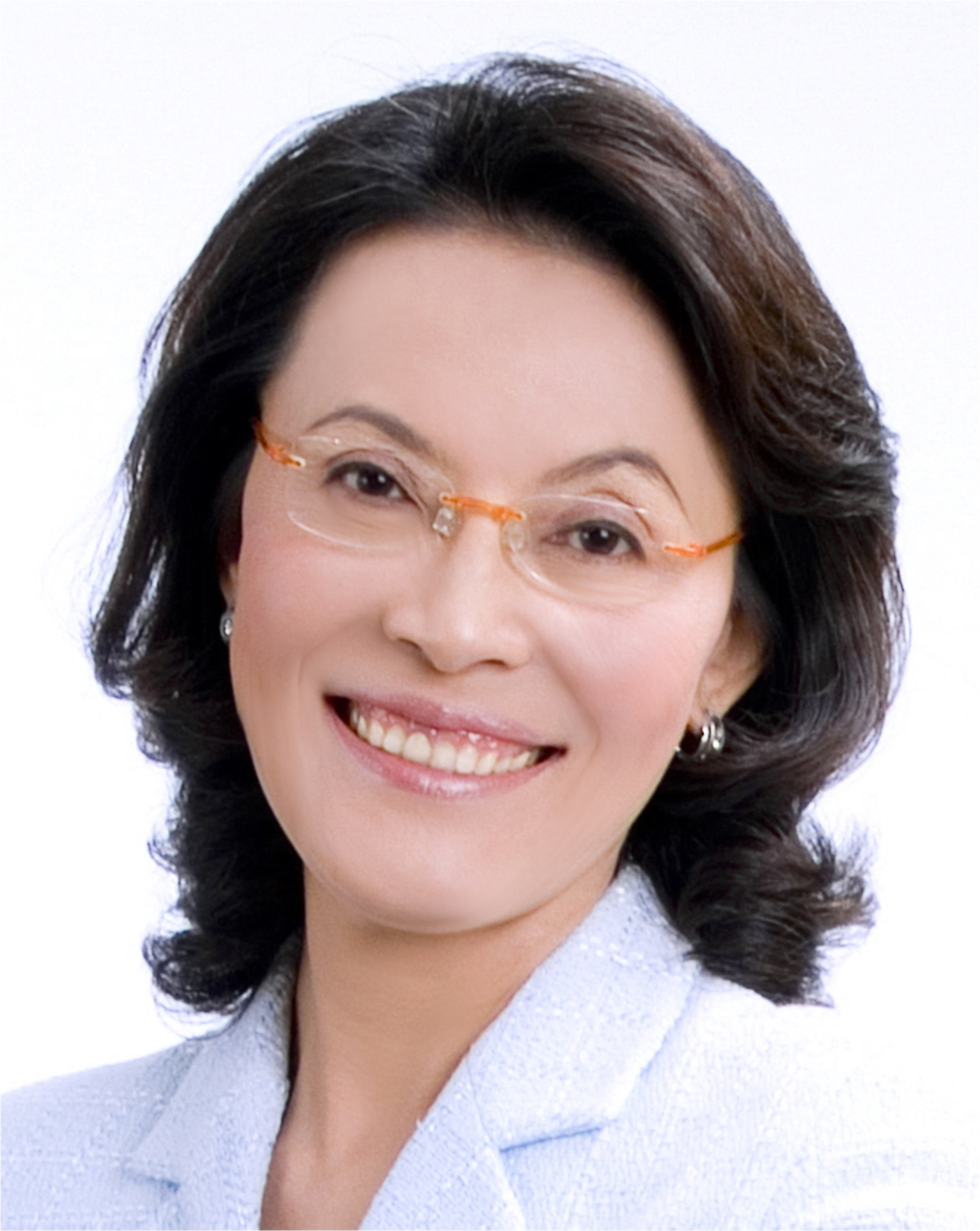

Member of the Legislative Yuan
- In office 1 February 1993 – 31 January 2020
- Succeeded by: Liu Shyh-fang (2016)
- Constituency: See list: Kaohsiung 1st (1993-2002) National At-Large (2002-2008) Kaohsiung 3 (2008-2016) National At-Large (2016-2020)

Kaohsiung City Councillor
- In office 25 December 1981 – 1 February 1993
- Constituency: Nanzih and Zuoying

Personal details
- Born: 22 August 1953 (age 73) Fuxing, Changhua County, Taiwan
- Party: Kuomintang
- Spouse(s): Chen Yun-long (div.); Wang Chung-yi
- Children: Chen Ching-hui (Note: and 2 stepsons through her marriage with Wang.)
- Parent: Huang Tzuen-chiou
- Education: Kaohsiung Medical College (MB); National Sun Yat-sen University (MBA)

Huang Chao-shun (Chinese: 黃昭順; pinyin: Huáng Zhāoshùn; Wade–Giles: Huang Chao-shun; born 22 August 1953) is a Taiwanese politician and physician who was a member of the Legislative Yuan from 2002 to 2020. She is a member of the Kuomintang (KMT).

== Early life and education ==
Huang was born in Changhua on August 22, 1953. Her father, Huang Tsun-chiu, served as the president of the Control Yuan from 1987 to 1993.

After high school, Huang earned her Bachelor of Medicine (M.B.) specializing in pharmacy from Kaohsiung Medical College in 2006. She later earned a master's degree in business administration from National Sun Yat-sen University (NSYSU).

== Political career and electoral history ==
On 12 January 2008, Huang joined the Republic of China legislative election as the KMT candidate representing Kaohsiung City's 1st constituency. She eventually went on to win the election with the highest votes in Kaohsiung among other 8 elects.

No.	Candidate	Party	Votes	Ratio	Elected
1	Huang Chao-shun	Kuomintang	92,417	58.30%	
2	Pasuya Yao	Democratic Progressive Party	65,266	41.17%	
3	Cian Huei Yang (錢彙穎)	Civil Party	841	0.53%	

On 27 November 2010, Huang joined Kaohsiung City Mayoralty election as the KMT candidate. However, she lost to incumbent Kaohsiung City Mayor Chen Chu of the Democratic Progressive Party.

Party	#	Candidate	Votes	Percentage
Independent	1	Yang Chiu-hsing	414,950	26.68%
Kuomintang (Chinese Nationalist Party)	2	Huang Chao-shun	319,171	20.52%
Democratic Progressive Party	3	Chen Chu	821,089	52.80%
Total			1,555,210	100.00%
Voter turnout			72.52%	

On 14 January 2012, Huang joined the Republic of China legislative election as the KMT candidate representing Kaohsiung City's 3rd constituency. She eventually won the election.

== Personal life ==
Huang's father, Huang Tzuen-chiou, has served as the President of the Control Yuan from 1987 to 1993. Through her first marriage, she has a daugher, Chen Ching-hui, who is currently a member of the Legislative Yuan through Kuomintang's party-list since 2024. She remarried to Wang Chung-yi, who is the minister of the Coast Guard Administration from 2014 to 2016 during the presidency of Ma Ying-jeou. Through her marriage with Wang, she has two setepsons.

is married with one child.
