= Yang Chiu-hsing =

Taiwanese politician (born 1956)

- 楊秋興
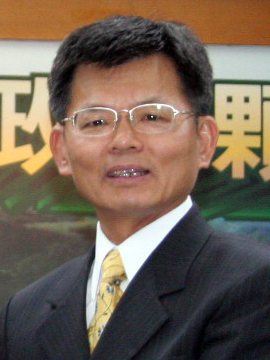

Minister without Portfolio
- In office 6 February 2012 – 8 December 2014
- Prime Minister: Sean Chen; Jiang Yi-huah

11th Magistrate of Kaohsiung
- In office 20 December 2001 – 25 December 2010
- Preceded by: Yu Cheng-hsien
- Succeeded by: Chen Chu (as Mayor of Kaohsiung)

Personal details
- Born: 15 May 1956 (age 69) Yanchao, Kaohsiung, Taiwan
- Party: Independent (2010–2013; since 2019)
- Other political affiliations: Kuomintang (1975–1976; 2013–2019); Democratic Progressive Party (1987–2010)
- Education: National Taiwan University (BS, MS)

Yang Chiu-hsing (Chinese: 楊秋興; pinyin: Yáng Qiūxìng; born 15 May 1956) is a Taiwanese politician. He was a Minister without Portfolio in the Executive Yuan and Magistrate of Kaohsiung County.

== Kaohsiung County Magistracy ==
Yang was elected as the Magistrate of Kaohsiung County after winning the 2001 Kaohsiung magisterial election as a Democratic Progressive Party (DPP) candidate on 1 December 2001 and took office on 20 December 2001. He was reelected for ta second magisterial term after winning the 2005 Kaohsiung magisterial election under DPP on 3 December 2005 and took office on 20 December 2005.

=== 2010 Kaohsiung Mayoralty election ===
On 27 November 2010, Yang joined Kaohsiung City Mayoralty election as independent candidate. However, he lost to incumbent Kaohsiung City Mayor Chen Chu, the Democratic Progressive Party candidate.

Party	#	Candidate	Votes	Percentage
Independent	1	Yang Chiu-hsing	414,950	26.68%
Kuomintang (Chinese Nationalist Party)	2	Huang Chao-shun	319,171	20.52%
Democratic Progressive Party	3	Chen Chu	821,089	52.80%
Total			1,555,210	100.00%
Voter turnout			72.52%	

== 2014 Kaohsiung Mayoral election ==
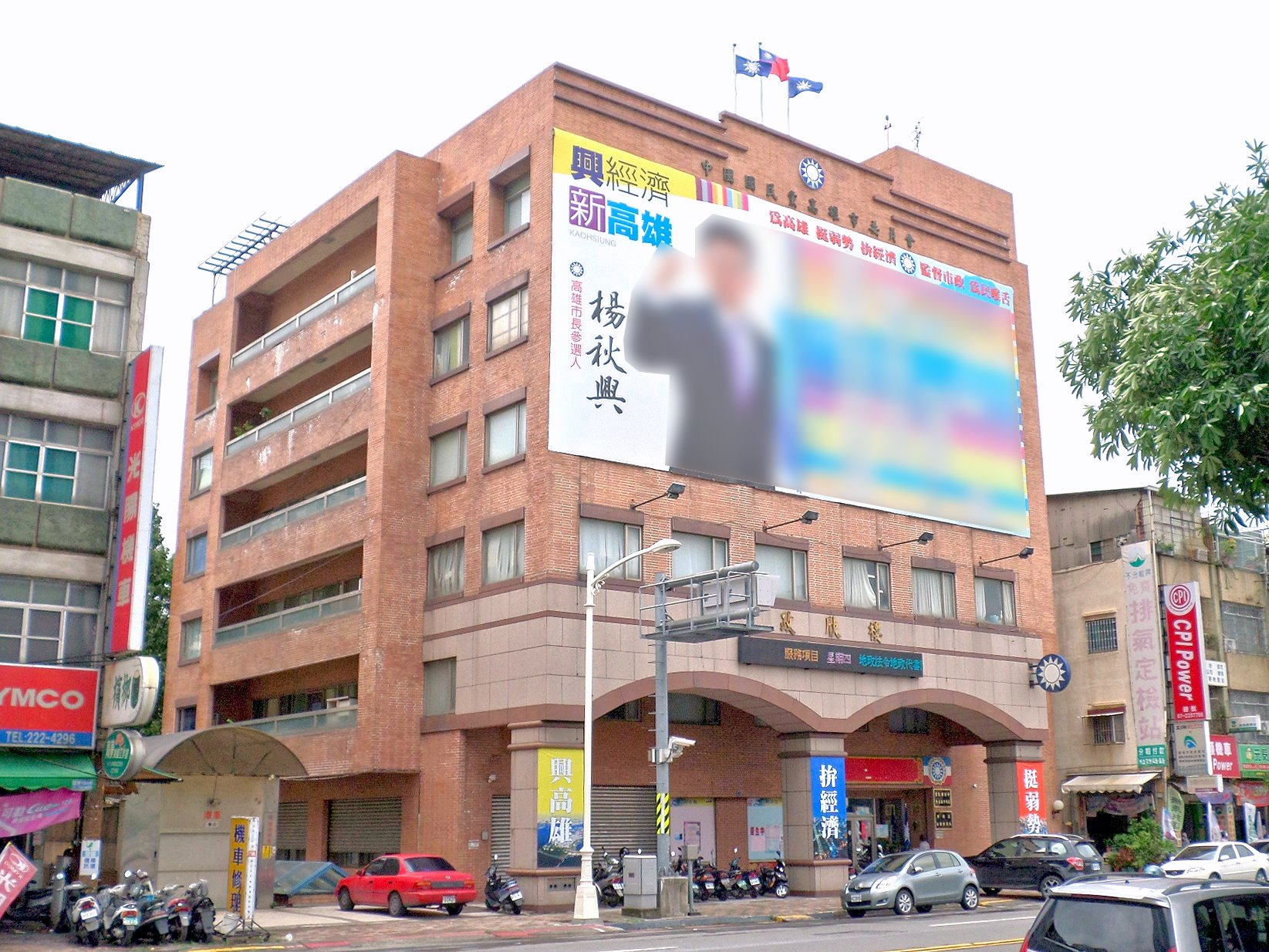
Yang's mayoral campaign banner at KMT Kaohsiung headquarter office

On 29 November 2014, Yang joined Kaohsiung City mayoralty election as Kuomintang candidate for Mayor of Kaohsiung position, going against his rival incumbent Mayor Chen Chu of DPP. He however lost to Chen.

2014 Kaohsiung City Mayoralty Election Result
No.	Candidate	Party	Votes	Percentage
1	Chou Ko-sheng (周可盛)	Independent	14,925	1.02%
2	Chen Chu	DPP	993,300	68.09%
3	Yang Chiu-hsing	KMT	450,647	30.89%
