= Yu Lin-ya =

Taiwanese politician

- 余玲雅

Member of the Legislative Yuan
- In office 1 February 1996 – 31 January 1999
- Constituency: Kaohsiung County
- In office 1 February 1993 – 31 January 1996
- Constituency: Republic of China

Personal details
- Born: 29 June 1950 (age 76)
- Party: Democratic Progressive Party
- Relations: Yu Cheng-hsien, Yu Jane-daw (brothers)
- Parent: Yu Chen Yueh-ying (mother)
- Education: National Chengchi University (BA); National Sun Yat-sen University (MPA, MA, PhD)

Yu Lin-ya (Chinese: 余玲雅; pinyin: Yú Língyǎ; born 29 June 1950) is a Taiwanese politician who served in the Legislative Yuan from 1993 to 1999.

== Life and career ==
Yu was born in 1950 to the Yu family of Kaohsiung. Her grandfather, mother, and brothers were also politicians.

After high school, Yu graduated from National Chengchi University with a bachelor's degree in history. She then earned an M.P.A., a master's degree in management, and a Ph.D. from National Sun Yat-sen University. She later became president of the Private Kao Yuan Junior College of Technology.

Yu began her political career as a member of the Taiwan Provincial Assembly. Elected to the Legislative Yuan in 1992 and 1995, Yu later served as vice chair of the Research, Development and Evaluation Commission and speaker of the Taiwan Provincial Consultative Council.

In 2017, the Ciaotou District Court in Kaohsiung ruled that Yu was guilty on charges of breach of trust, as she had used funds from Kao Yuan to pay her personal assistant from 1988 to 2006. The Kaohsiung branch of the Taiwan High Court upheld the guilty verdict in 2018, reducing her sentence from two years to nine months imprisonment.
