= Pharmaceutical Affairs Law (Taiwan) =

- Traditional Chinese: 藥事法
- Simplified Chinese: 药事法
Transcriptions
Standard Mandarin
- Hanyu Pinyin: Yàoshìfǎ

Pharmaceutical and Drug Manufacturer Administration Law
- Traditional Chinese: 藥物藥商管理法
- Simplified Chinese: 药物药商管理法
Transcriptions
Standard Mandarin
- Hanyu Pinyin: Yàowù Yàoshāng Guǎnlǐfǎ

The Pharmaceutical Affairs Law (PAL) of the Taiwan is a law regulating the manufacturing, importation, and sale of drugs and medical devices.

== Legislative history ==
The law was first publicised on 17 August 1970 as the Pharmaceutical and Drug Manufacturer Administration Law, with 90 articles. Thereafter it was amended eleven times (listed by date of publication):

1. 4 April 1979: amended Articles 24 to 27 and 54
2. 5 February 1993: Act #0476 changed the name of the law to its present name and amended the whole text, with a new total of 106 articles.
3. 8 March 1993: Act #0539 amended articles 38 and 61
4. 7 May 1997: Act #8600104890 amended articles 53 and 106. Executive Yuan Order #075680-3 on 25 December 2001 established regulations as directed under article 53, bringing it into effect from 1 January 2002.
5. 24 June 1998: Act #8700122830 amended article 103
6. 26 April 2000: Act #8900105220 amended articles 2, 3, 27, 66, 77 to 79, 100, and 102
7. 6 February 2003: Act #09200017750 amended article 39 and added subarticles 48-1 and 96–1
8. 21 April 2004: Act #09300074821:
  - amended articles 1, 8 9, 11, 13, 16, 22, 33, 37, 40 to 42, 45, 47, 48, 57, 62, 64, 66, 74 to 78, 82, 83, 91 to 93, 95, 96
  - added sub-articles 27–1, 40–1, 45–1, 57–1, 66–1, 97–1, 99–1, 104–1, 104–2
  - deleted articles 61 and 63
9. 5 February 2005: Act #09400017691 amended sub-article 40-1 and added sub-article 40–2
10. 17 May 2006: Act #09500069811 amended articles 66, 91, 92, 95, and 99, and deleted article 98
11. 30 May 2006: Act #09500075771 amended articles 82, 83, and 106 with effect from 1 July 2006

Article 103 of the February 1993 version of the law removed herbalists' rights to dispense drugs. In 1996, legislators from various parties are believed to have taken bribes from the National Union Chinese Medicine Association (中華民國中藥商業同業公會聯合會) in exchange for their support of an amendment reversing the February 1993 changes. The eight legislators in question were indicted in January 2008. Among them, Jao Yung-ching (DPP) was simultaneously indicted in another bribery case regarding a 2003 amendment to the Oral Healthcare Act. Of the eight legislators in question, Chiu Chuei-chen (DPP) and Liao Hwu-peng (KMT) were found guilty in a lower court trial, while the remainder were found not guilty. However, the High Court reversed the lower court ruling in September 2010; Lin Kuang-hua and Jao Yung-ching (both DPP) received eight-year sentences, Feng Ting-kuo (PFP) got seven years and two months, while Chen Horng-chi (KMT) was sentenced to seven years.

== Effects ==
The PAL establishes labelling requirements for all items under its purview, requiring them to display an authorisation number, expiration date, usage instructions, and a list of side effects. Such items are not limited to ingested medicines, but include other items such as condoms and face masks. The Department of Health is tasked with inspections to ensure compliance with the law; private organisations such as the Consumers' Foundation have also been known to carry out clandestine checks. A February 2007 check of sex shops found that 18 out of 25 condom brands did not label their ingredients clearly or at all, while 22 gave an incorrect authorisation number or none at all. A 2009 survey, also by the Consumers' Foundation, looked at 41 face masks (17 N95 masks and 24 surgical masks), and found that 90% did not meet the labelling and packaging requirements.

Sellers of drugs and medical devices are required by article 27 of the PAL to obtain a license from the Ministry of Health. Furthermore, article 37 requires that sales of all drugs, though not of medical devices, be carried out by a licensed pharmacist (or assistant pharmacist, in the case of non-narcotic drugs). Not just pharmacies, but various other types of stores including convenience stores and supermarkets, have been able to obtain the required licenses. However, many small online sellers bring covered items back from overseas and sell them on internet auction websites without knowing about this requirement. Under articles 27 and 92, fines could range from NT$30,000 to $150,000. Items covered under the law include not just those which consumers traditionally think of as pharmaceuticals, but some unexpected items such as make-up, tooth bleaching agents, hair removal products, band-aids, knee pads, and body fat percentage monitors.

== See also ==
- Full text of the law (in Chinese) on Wikisource
