= Kaohsiung City Constituency 3 =

Constituency of the Legislative Yuan of Taiwan

- Single-member constituency for the Legislative Yuan
- District(s): Zuoying, Nanzih
- Electorate: 314,457 (2024 election)

Current constituency
- Created: 2008 (As Kaohsiung City 1); 2010 (current name)
- Party: DPP
- Member: Lee Po-yi

Kaohsiung City Constituency 3 (Chinese: 高雄市第三選舉區) is one of the 73 regional constituencies represented in the Legislative Yuan, the national legislature of Taiwan. It was created in 2008 (as Kaohsiung City Constituency 1) following a series of constitutional reforms, and elects one legislator, through first-past-the-post voting, to the Legislative Yuan. It has been represented by Lee Po-yi of the Democratic Progressive Party since 2024.

== Legislators ==
Election	Legislator	Party
2008 - 2016	Huang Chao-shun	Kuomintang
2016 - 2024	Liu Shih-fang	Democratic Progressive Party
2024	Lee Po-yi	Democratic Progressive Party

== Election results ==

=== 2008 (Note: Named Kaohsiung City Constituency 1, boundaries unchanged) ===
2008 Taiwanese legislative election: Kaohsiung City 1
Candidate	Party	Votes	%
Huang Chao-shun	Kuomintang	92,417	58.30
Yao Wen-chih	Democratic Progressive Party	65,266	41.17
Chien Hui-ying	Civil Party	841	0.53
Total		158,524	100.00
Valid votes		158,524	98.94
Invalid/blank votes		1,705	1.06
Total votes		160,229	100.00
Registered voters/turnout		256,225	62.53
Majority		27,151	17.13
Kuomintang win (new seat)			

=== 2012 ===
* denotes the incumbent representative

2012 Taiwanese legislative election: Kaohsiung 3
Candidate	Party	Votes	%	+/–
Huang Chao-shun	Kuomintang	101,055	48.72	▼9.58
Lin Ying-jung	Democratic Progressive Party	95,617	46.10	▲4.93
Li Chien-nan	People First Party	7,296	3.52	NEW
Lin Chen-yang	Green Party Taiwan	3,448	1.66	NEW
Total		207,416	100.00	–
Valid votes		207,416	99.06	
Invalid/blank votes		1,961	0.94	
Total votes		209,377	100.00	
Registered voters/turnout		273,788	76.47	
Majority		5,438	2.62	
Kuomintang hold				

=== 2016 ===
2016 Taiwanese legislative election: Kaohsiung 3
Candidate	Party	Votes	%	+/–
Liu Shih-fang	Democratic Progressive Party	102,255	53.51	▲7.41
Chang Hsien-yao	Kuomintang	73,792	38.61	▼10.11
Liang Pei-chen	Faith and Hope League	11,546	6.04	NEW
Liu Shu-fang	Independent	1,935	1.01	NEW
Chuang Ming-hsien	Taiwan Constitution Association	1,583	0.83	NEW
Total		191,111	100.00	–
Valid votes		191,111	98.54	
Invalid/blank votes		2,834	1.46	
Total votes		193,945	100.00	
Registered voters/turnout		289,344	67.03	
Majority		28,463	14.9	
Democratic Progressive Party gain from Kuomintang				

=== 2020 ===
* denotes the incumbent representative

2020 Taiwanese legislative election: Kaohsiung 3
Candidate	Party	Votes	%	+/–
Liu Shih-fang*	Democratic Progressive Party	102,300	43.75	▼9.76
Huang Chao-shun	Kuomintang	87,665	37.49	▼1.12
Kuo Hsin-cheng	Independent	24,277	10.38	NEW
Chuang Yi-liang	Taiwan People's Party	12,099	5.17	NEW
Su Po-ting	People First Party	3,138	1.34	NEW
Tang Jinn-chuan	Independent	1,288	0.55	NEW
Chang Yu-hsuan	Formosa Alliance	1,237	0.53	NEW
Liu Shu-fang	Taiwan Independence Party	939	0.40	▼0.61
Cheng Pin-chuan	Congress Party Alliance	412	0.18	NEW
Li Kuo-chiu-lan	Interfaith Union	319	0.14	NEW
Wang Kuei-hsiung	Revive China Alliance	155	0.07	NEW
Total		233,829	100.00	–
Valid votes		233,829	98.75	
Invalid/blank votes		2,958	1.25	
Total votes		236,787	100.00	
Registered voters/turnout		304,481	77.77	
Majority		14,635	6.36	
Democratic Progressive Party hold				

=== 2024 ===
* denotes the incumbent representative

2024 Taiwanese legislative election: Kaohsiung 3
Candidate	Party	Votes	%	+/–
Lee Po-yi	Democratic Progressive Party	108,184	49.06	▲5.31
Li Mei-jhen	Kuomintang	101,513	46.03	▲8.54
Kuo Hsi	Taiwan Mahjong Biggest Party	7,147	3.24	NEW
Chen Chuan-lin	Independent	2,549	1.16	NEW
Chang Cheng-ta	Independent	1,121	0.51	NEW
Total		220,514	100.00	–
Valid votes		220,514	98.09	
Invalid/blank votes		4,285	1.91	
Total votes		224,799	100.00	
Registered voters/turnout		314,457	71.49	
Majority		6,671	3.03	
Democratic Progressive Party hold				
