= National Human Rights Commission (Taiwan) =

- 國家人權委員會; Guójiā Rénquán Wěiyuánhuì (Mandarin); Kok-ka Jîn-koân Úi-oân-hōe (Taiwanese); Koet-kâ Ngìn-khièn Vî-yèn-fi (Hakka)

Agency overview
- Formed: August 1, 2020
- Preceding agency: Presidential Office Human Rights Consultative Committee
- Jurisdiction: Taiwan (Republic of China)
- Headquarters: Zhongzheng, Taipei
- Agency executives: Chen Chu, Chairperson; Wang Jung-chang, Vice Chairperson
- Parent agency: Control Yuan
- Website: nhrc.cy.gov.tw

Chinese name
- Traditional Chinese: 國家人權委員會
Transcriptions
Standard Mandarin
- Hanyu Pinyin: Guójiā Rénquán Wěiyuánhuì
Hakka
- Romanization: Koet-kâ Ngìn-khièn Vî-yèn-f
Southern Min
- Hokkien POJ: Kok-ka Jîn-koân Úi-oân-hōe

The National Human Rights Commission of Taiwan was founded on August 1, 2020 as Taiwan’s national human rights institution. The commission is designed to promote and protect human rights in Taiwan and fulfill the government's commitment to meet the Paris Principles. The first chair of the commission is Chen Chu.

The functions and powers of the National Human Rights Commission are as follows:

1. To investigate incidents involving torture, human rights violations, or various forms of discrimination in accordance with its authority or in response to petition from the general public, and to handle them and provide remedy according to the law.

2. To study and review national human rights policies and make recommendations.

3. To publish thematic reports on major human rights issues or annual reports on the state of human rights in the nation to understand and assess the domestic human rights situation.

4. To assist government agencies in the signing or ratification of international human rights instruments and their incorporation, and to ensure the conformity of domestic laws, regulations, directives, and administrative measures with international human rights norms.

5. To conduct systematic studies of the Constitution and legal statutes based on international human rights standards in order to propose necessary and feasible recommendations to amend the Constitution, legislation and laws.

6. To monitor the effectiveness of government agencies in promoting human rights education, enhancing human rights awareness, and handling matters involving human rights

7. To cooperate with domestic institutions and civic groups, international organizations, national human rights institutes, and non-governmental organizations to promote the protection of human rights

8. To provide independent opinions for national reports submitted by the government in accordance with the provisions of international human rights treaties

9. Other matters related to the protection and promotion of human rights

The Presidential Office Human Rights Consultative Committee (總統府人權諮詢委員會) ceased operations on May 19, 2020 after the Organic Act of the Control Yuan National Human Rights Commission (《監察院國家人權委員會組織法》) was implemented on May 1, 2020.

== See also ==
- Human rights in Taiwan
- Government of the Republic of China
- Control Yuan
