= Yu Chen Yueh-ying =

Taiwanese politician, judge and matriarch of the Yu family

- 余陳月瑛

Magistrate of Kaohsiung County
- In office 20 December 1985 – 20 December 1993
- Preceded by: Tsai Ming-yao
- Succeeded by: Yu Cheng-hsien

Member of the Legislative Yuan
- In office 1 February 1984 – 20 December 1985
- Preceded by: Huang Yu Hsiu-luan
- Constituency: Kaohsiung

Personal details
- Born: 2 September 1926 Takao Prefecture, Taiwan, Empire of Japan (today Yancheng District, Kaohsiung, Taiwan)
- Died: 26 May 2014 (aged 87) Niaosong, Kaohsiung, Taiwan
- Party: Democratic Progressive Party
- Children: Yu Lin-ya, Yu Jane-daw, Yu Cheng-hsien

Yu Chen Yueh-ying (Chinese: 余陳月瑛; pinyin: Yú Chén Yuèyīng; 2 September 1926 – 26 May 2014) was a Taiwanese politician, judge and matriarch of the Yu family, a political family that dominated politics in the former Kaohsiung County for more than thirty years. (Kaohsiung County was merged with Kaohsiung City on December 25, 2010, to form a special municipality, Kaohsiung). Among her six children is Yu Cheng-hsien, who served as the Interior Minister from 2002 to 2004.

== Early life ==
Chen Yueh-ying was the youngest of eleven children born to factory owner Chen Tsai-hsing. She married Yu Jui-yen at the suggestion of a matchmaker. Yu Chen's father-in-law, Yu Teng-fa, served as the Commissioner of Kaohsiung County from 1960 until 1963.

== Political career ==
In 1963, Yu Chen entered politics by running as a candidate for the Taiwan Provincial Council at the behest of Yu Teng-fa. She served on the Provincial Council for four terms.

In 1981, Yu Chen ran for Kaohsiung County magistrate, but lost to Tsai Ming-yao of the Kuomintang (KMT) by just over 3,000 votes. She was elected to the Legislative Yuan in 1982. In 1985, Yu Chen ran for Kaohsiung County commissioner a second time and defeated incumbent commissioner Tsai Ming-yao in a rematch. She became the first female county commissioner in 1987, following the end of martial law in Taiwan. Yu Chen served as county commissioner for two terms until 1993.

Her son, Yu Cheng-hsien, succeeded her as Kaohsiung County Commissioner for two consecutive four-year terms. He then served as Taiwan's Interior Minister from 2002 to 2004 as a member of the Democratic Progressive Party.

Yu Chen was later named an adviser to President Chen Shui-bian.

== Death ==
She died at Kaohsiung Chang Gung Memorial Hospital in Kaohsiung on May 26, 2014, at the age of 87. Her funeral was held in the Yu family's hometown of Ciaotou District.
