= List of county magistrates of Kaohsiung =

This is a list of magistrates of the former Kaohsiung County:

#	Name	Office	Political Party
1	Hsieh Tung-min (謝東閔)	8 January 1946 – 1 October 1947	Kuomintang
2	Mao Chen-huan (毛振寰)	1 October 1947 – 18 October 1948	Kuomintang
3	Huang Chien-fen (黃劍棻)	18 October 1948 – 21 April 1950	Kuomintang
4	Dong Chung-sheng (董中生)	21 April 1950 – 30 April 1951	Kuomintang
5	Hung Jung-hua (洪榮華)	1 May 1951 – 2 June 1954	Kuomintang
6	Chen Hsin-an (陳新安)	2 June 1954 – 2 June 1957	Kuomintang
7	Chen Chi-hsing (陳皆興)	2 June 1957 – 2 June 1960	Kuomintang
8	Yu Teng-fa (余登發)	2 June 1960 – 27 September 1963	Independent
Acting	Lin Shih-cheng (林石城)	27 September 1963 – 2 June 1964	Kuomintang
9	Tai Liang-ching (戴良慶)	2 June 1964 – 2 June 1968	Kuomintang
10	Lin Yuan-yuan (林淵源)	2 June 1968 – 20 December 1977	Kuomintang
11	Huang Yu-jen (黃友仁)	20 December 1977 – 20 December 1981	Independent
12	Tsai Ming-yao (蔡明耀)	20 December 1981 – 20 December 1985	Kuomintang
13	Yu Chen Yueh-ying (余陳月瑛)	20 December 1985 – 20 December 1993	Democratic Progressive Party
14	Yu Cheng-hsien (余政憲)	20 December 1993 – 20 December 2001	Democratic Progressive Party
15	Yang Chiu-hsing (楊秋興)	20 December 2001 – 25 December 2010	Democratic Progressive Party

== See also ==
- Kaohsiung County
- Kaohsiung
- List of mayors of Kaohsiung
