= Huang Yu Hsiu-luan =

Taiwanese politician

Huang Yu Hsiu-luan (Chinese: 黃余秀鸞) was a Taiwanese politician who represented Kaoshiung in the First Legislative Yuan from 1981 to 1984. She was succeeded in office by her sister in-law Yu Chen Yueh-ying. Huang Yu Hsiu-luan was married to Huang Yu-jen.
