= Pan-Purple Coalition =

Alliance of Fairness and Justice 公平正義聯盟 Gōngpíng zhèngyì liánméng
- Pan-Purple Coalition logo
- Type: Social activist umbrella group
- Location: Taiwan
- Website: Justice.org.tw/

The Pan-Purple Coalition (Chinese: 泛紫聯盟; pinyin: Fànzǐ Liánméng) or the Alliance of Fairness and Justice (AFJ, Chinese: 公平正義聯盟; pinyin: Gōngpíng Zhèngyì Liánméng) is a social activist umbrella group based in the Republic of China (Taiwan). The coalition brings together nine social welfare organizations and promotes the causes of the underprivileged. It supports progressive taxation, a national social welfare system, education reforms, and gender and ethnic equality.

Its name is a reference to the Pan-Blue Coalition and the Pan-Green Coalition, two political coalitions also based in Taiwan. The Pan-Purple Coalition has accused Pan-Blue and Pan-Green of causing ethnic rifts running along the issue of unification with China vs. independence, and has rejected overtures to join either group despite having organizations which individually had former associations with either group. Ultimately, they are not considered a political faction within Taiwan but rather a group which supports the current status quo situation between mainland China and Taiwan.

== Member organizations ==
- Peacetime Foundation of Taiwan (臺灣促進和平文教基金會)
- The League of Welfare Organizations for the Disabled (中華民國殘障聯盟)
- National Teachers' Association R.O.C. (中華民國全國教師會)
- Federation for the Welfare of the Elderly (中華民國老人福利推動聯盟)
- Parents' Association for Persons with Intellectual Disability, R.O.C. (中華民國智障者家長總會)
- Awakening Foundation (婦女新知基金會): women's right
- Eden Social Welfare Foundation (伊甸社會福利基金會)
- Taiwan Labor Front (臺灣勞工陣線)
- The National Federation of Banks' Employees Union (中華民國銀行員工會全國聯合會)

== See also ==
- New Power Party
- Taiwan People's Party
- Politics of the Republic of China
