= Yu Cheng-hsien =

Taiwanese politician

- 余政憲
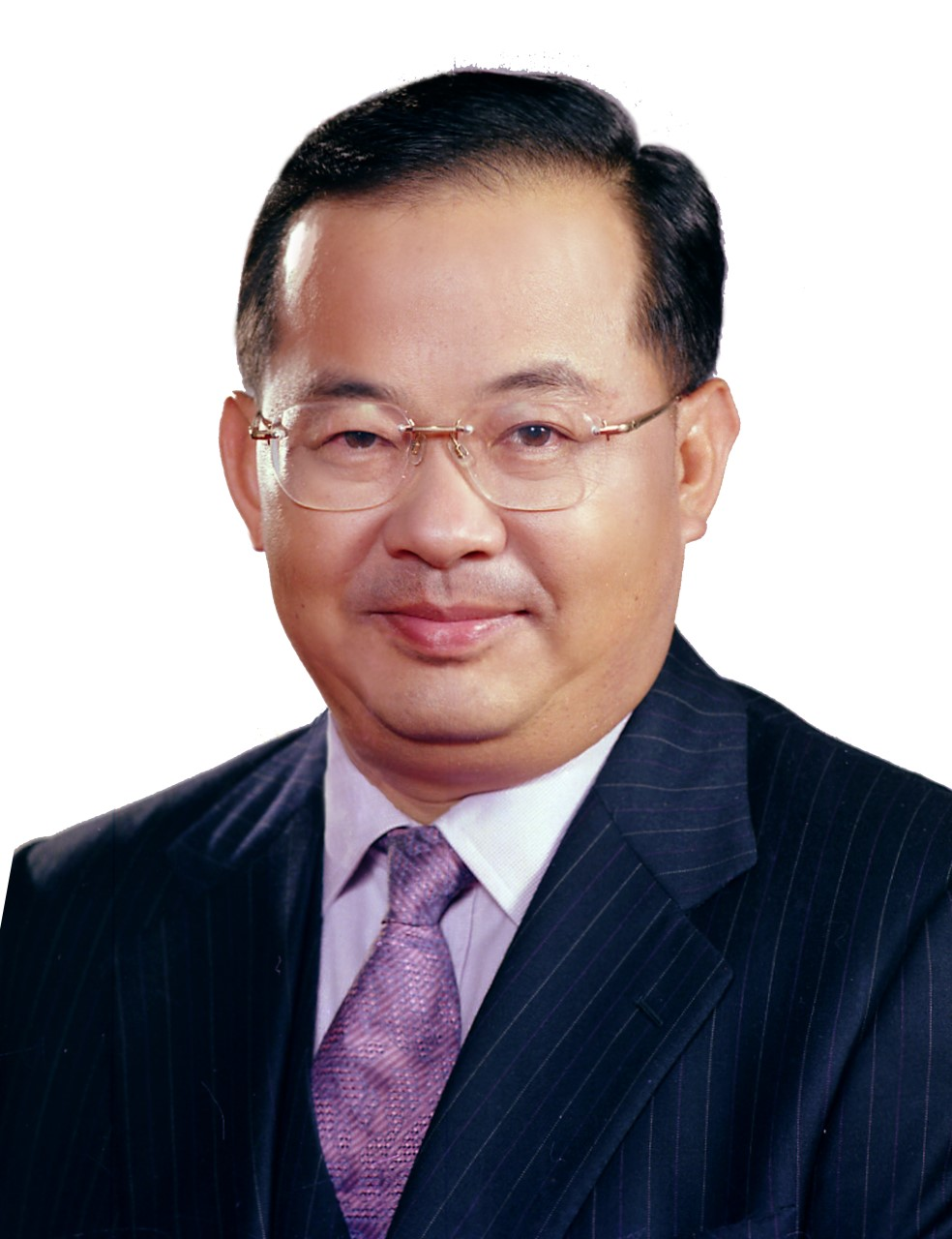
- Official portrait, 2000

Minister of the Interior of the Republic of China
- In office 1 February 2002 – 9 April 2004
- Preceded by: Chang Po-ya
- Succeeded by: Su Chia-chyuan

Magistrate of Kaohsiung County
- In office 20 December 1993 – 20 December 2001
- Preceded by: Yu Chen Yueh-ying
- Succeeded by: Yang Chiu-hsing

Member of the Legislative Yuan
- In office 1 February 1987 – 20 December 1993
- Constituency: Kaohsiung

Personal details
- Born: 8 May 1959 (age 67) Kaohsiung County, Taiwan
- Party: Democratic Progressive Party
- Spouse: Cheng Kuei-lien
- Relations: Yu Chen Yueh-ying (mother)
- Education: Feng Chia University (BA); I-Shou University (MBA); Chang Jung Christian University (DBA); National Kaohsiung Normal University (PhD)

Yu Cheng-hsien (Chinese: 余政憲; pinyin: Yú Zhèngxiàn; born 8 May 1959) is a Taiwanese politician. He was the Minister of the Interior from 2002 to 2004. Currently, he is the CEO of Senao International

== Education ==
Yu graduated from Feng Chia University with a bachelor's degree in international economics in 1984 and earned a Master of Business Administration (M.B.A.) from I-Shou University. He then earned two doctorates: a Doctor of Business Administration (D.B.A.) from Chang Jung Christian University and a Ph.D. in education from National Kaohsiung Normal University.

== Political careers ==
=== 2008 legislative election ===
- All registered: 242,349
- Voters (turnout): 156,440 (64.55%)
- Valid (percentage): 153,166 (97.91%)
- Rejected (percentage): 3,274 (2.09%)

Order	Candidate	Party	Votes	Percentage	Elected
1	Liu Zheng-wei	Taiwan Farmers' Party	3,250	2.12%	
2	Yu Cheng-hsien	Democratic Progressive Party	65,257	42.61%	
3	Lin Yi-shih	Kuomintang	84,659	55.27%	

=== Ministry of Interior ===
Yu submitted his resignation on 19 March 2004 from his ministerial position to take the responsibility over the 3-19 shooting incident on Chen Shui-bian in Tainan City but was asked by Premier Yu Shyi-kun to stay. He resubmitted his resignation again on 4 April 2004 after the demonstration made by Pan-Blue Coalition over the result of the 2004 presidential election had come under control.

== Personal life ==
Yu has a daughter, Yu Chia-chen, an electrical engineer who graduated from the California Institute of Technology and earned her doctorate from the Massachusetts Institute of Technology (MIT).
