= Cishan Bus Station =

Bus station in Qishan, Kaohsiung, Taiwan

Coordinates: 22°53′01.1″N 120°29′04.4″E

Cishan Bus (Transfer) Station 旗山轉運站
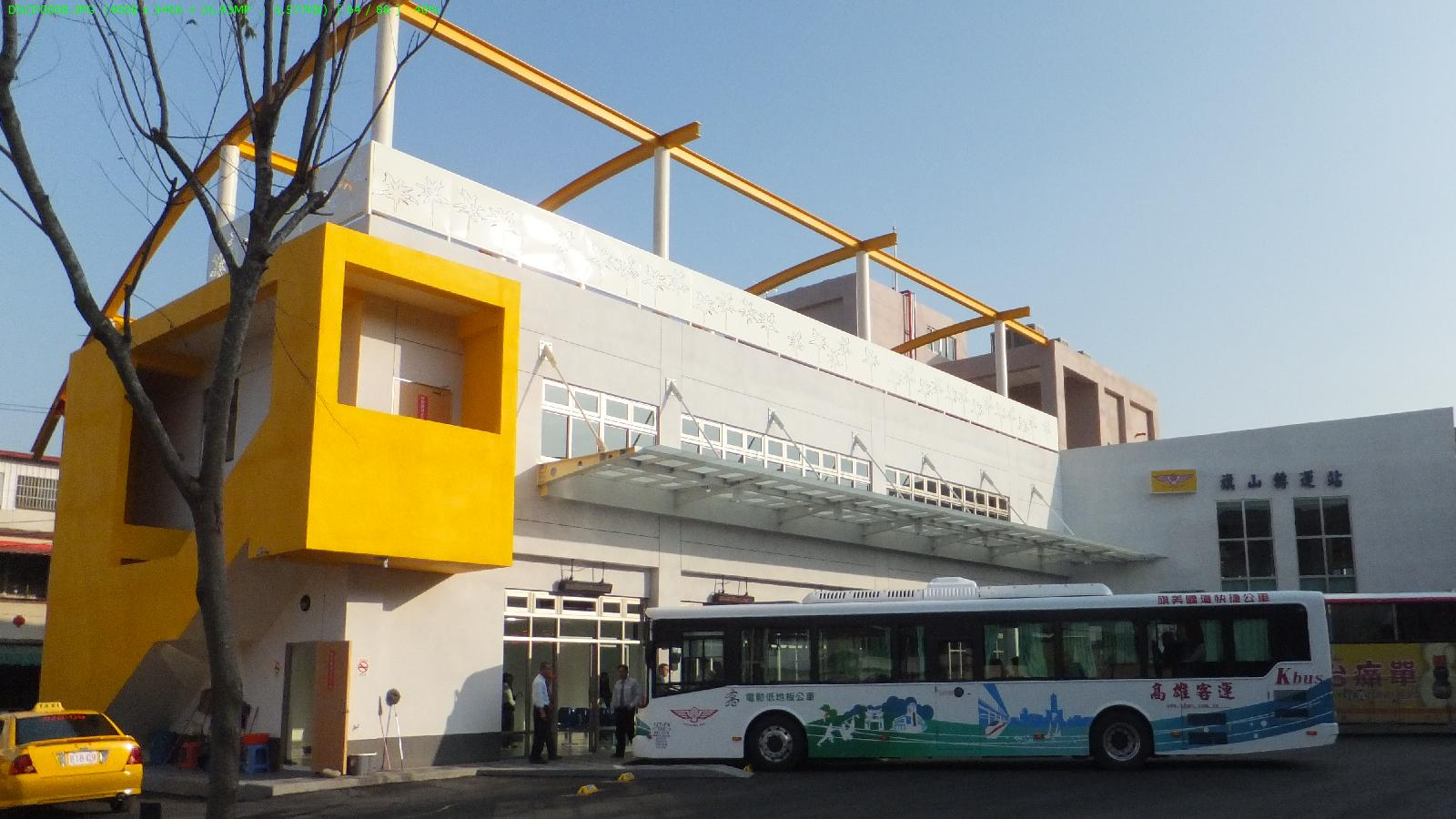

General information
- Location: No. 23, Datong Street; Cishan, Kaohsiung; Taiwan

Construction
- Structure type: At-grade

History
- Opened: 12 January 2013
Location

The Cishan Bus Station (Chinese: 旗山轉運站; pinyin: Qishan Zhuǎnyùnzhàn) is a bus station in Cishan District, Kaohsiung, Taiwan. This station is often referred as "the South Station" by local residents. The building was originally the Cishan South Bus Station of Kaohsiung Transportation Co., Ltd. and underwent modification with solar cells installed on the roof and reconfiguration of the interior. The modification was completed in 2013. Monitors were set to display coming buses. There were 7 doors for boarding/unboarding buses. Inside the building there are several shops, including a convenient store facing Datong Street. Customer services, such as lost items, is provided here.

The Cishan North Bus Station(Chinese: 旗山北站; pinyin: Qishan Beizhàn) is located at No.197, Yanping 1st Road, Cishan District, Kaohsiung City. It operates as a terminal station for some routes of Kaohsiung Transportation Co., Ltd..

== Facilities ==
=== Cishan Bus Station ===
- Toilet
- Convenient Store
- Kaohsiung Transportation Co. Ltd. local office

Passengers without valid smartcards have to buy tickets from the driver while boarding the bus. However, monthly tickets of some routes passing Cishan is available at the office of Kaohsiung Transportation Company in the station. The staff here also helps manage smartcard problems.

=== Cishan North Station ===
- Garage and yard of Kaohsiung Transportation Co. Ltd.

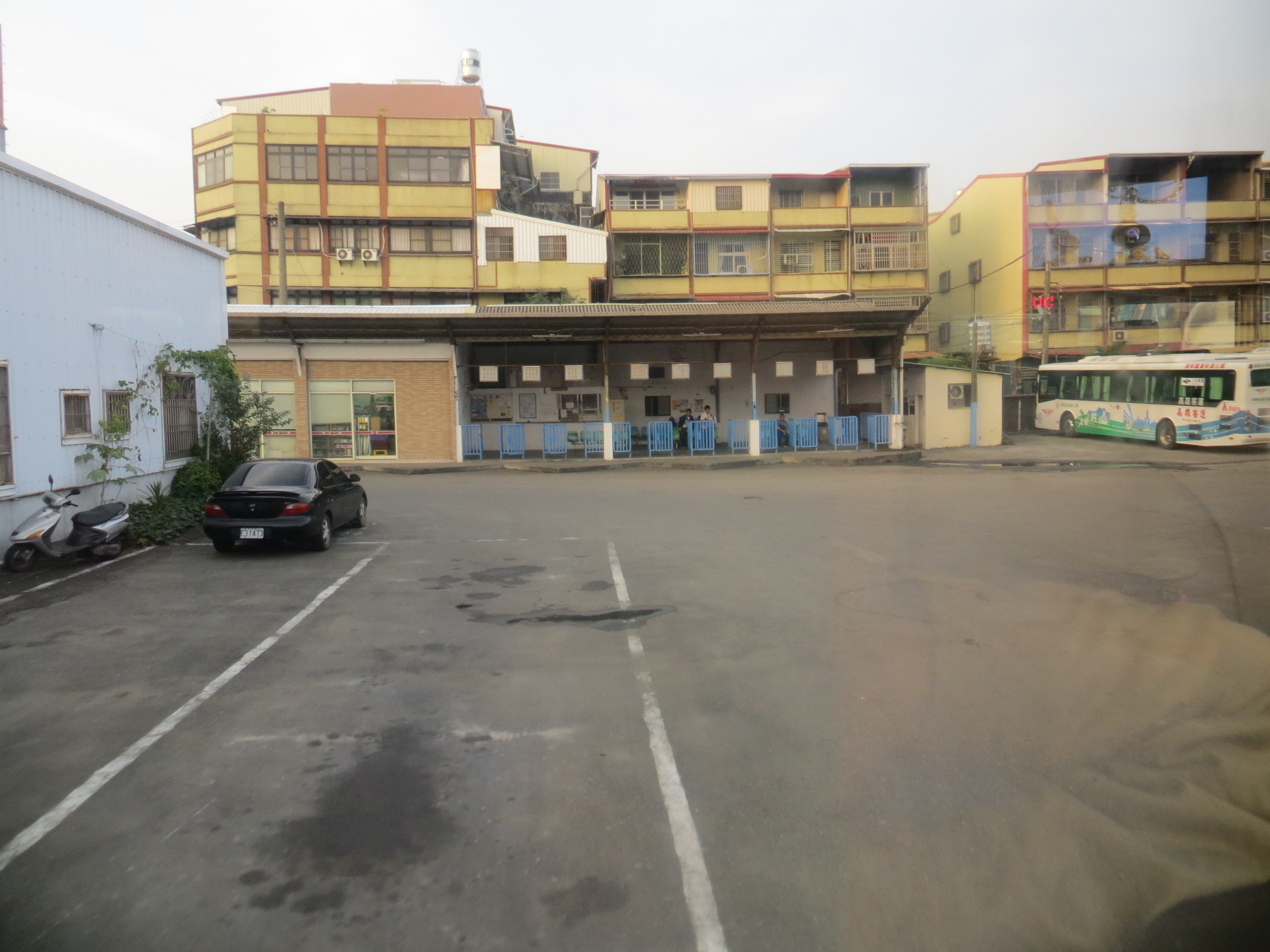
Cihan North Station in 2016

== Bus routes ==
=== Cishan Bus Station (the South station) ===
- Kaohsiung Transportation
  - E01: Zuoying HSR Station-Cishan-Meinong
  - E25: Kaohsiung-Meinong-Liouguei Bus Station
  - E28: Kaohsiung-Cishan-Meinong
  - E32: Kaohsiung-Jiaxian
  - 8009: Kaohsiung-Chengcing Lake-Cishan
  - 8010: Kaohsiung-Fo Guang Shan—Cishan
  - 8010 (local): Fengshan Bus Station-Cishan North Bus Station
  - 8012: Cishan-Gangshan Tou—Gangshan
  - 8023: Kaohsiung-Nanzih—Cishan
  - 8023 (local): Nanzih-Cishan
  - 8026: Cishan-Daai Village (Shanlin District)-Muzi
  - 8035: Cishan-Nanhua
  - 8035 (local): Cishan-Neimen
  - 8036: Cishan-Zhufeng Temple
  - 8037: Cishan North Bus Station-Ligang
  - 8042: Shih Chien University-Cishan North Bus Station-HSR Tainan Station
  - 8050: Tainan Train Station-Cishan Bus Station
  - H11: Taoyuan District Office (Kaohsiung)-Kaohsiung Chang Gung Memorial Hospital (on Mondays, Wednesdays, and Fridays)
  - H11A: Baolai-Kaohsiung Chang Gung Memorial Hospital (on Mondays, Wednesdays, and Fridays)
  - H12: Taoyuan District Office (Kaohsiung)-Kaohsiung Medical University Hospital (on Tuesdays and Thursdays)
  - H21: Namasia District Office-Kaohsiung Medical University Hospital (on Mondays, Wednesdays, and Fridays)
  - H21 (local): Jiaxian-Cishan (on Mondays, Wednesdays, and Fridays)
  - H22: Namasia District Office-Kaohsiung Chang Gung Memorial Hospital (on Tuesdays and Thursdays)
  - H31: Cishan-Duona (Maolin District) (on Weekdays)

=== Cishan North Bus Station ===
- Kaohsiung Transportation
  - E32: Kaohsiung-Jiaxian
  - 8023: Kaohsiung-Nanzih—Cishan
  - 8023 (local): Nanzih-Cishan
  - 8026: Cishan-Daai Village (Shanlin District)-Muzi
  - 8035: Cishan-Nanhua
  - 8035 (local): Cishan-Neimen
  - 8036: Cishan-Zhufeng Temple
  - 8037: Cishan North Bus Station-Ligang
  - 8042: Shih Chien University-Cishan North Bus Station-HSR Tainan Station
  - 8050: Tainan Train Station-Cishan Bus Station

== Nearby Tourist Attractions ==
- Jhongshan Old Street
- Qishan Station
- Qishan Tianhou Temple
- Cishan Wude Hall
- Jhongshan Park
- Stone Arches Corridor

== See also ==
- Kaohsiung Main Station
- Zuoying HSR Station
