= Lwo Shih-hsiung =

Taiwanese politician

Lwo Shih-hsiung MLY
- 羅世雄

Member of the Legislative Yuan
- In office 1 February 2002 – 31 January 2008
- Succeeded by: Chung Shao-ho
- Constituency: Kaohsiung 1

Personal details
- Born: 23 May 1969 (age 56) Kaohsiung, Taiwan
- Party: Kuomintang
- Parent: Luo Chuan-chin
- Education: National Cheng Kung University (BBA); National Sun Yat-sen University (MA, MBA, PhD)

Lwo Shih-hsiung (Chinese: 羅世雄; born 23 May 1969) is a Taiwanese politician.

== Early life and education ==
Lwo was born on May 23, 1969, in Kaohsiung. His father, Luo Chuan-chin, formerly served in the Legislative Yuan.

After high school, Lwo graduated from National Cheng Kung University with a bachelor's degree in business administration and earned an M.A. in human resource management, an M.B.A., and a Ph.D. in business administration from National Sun Yat-sen University.

== Political career ==
Lo was first elected in Kaohsiung 1st district in 2001, and won reelection for the same seat in 2004. In 2006, Lwo contested the Kuomintang nomination for the Kaohsiung mayoralty. The party backed Huang Jun-ying, and Huang lost to Democratic Progressive Party candidate Chen Chu. Lwo remained a member of the Legislative Yuan, and in May 2006, proposed a recall motion against president Chen Shui-bian that was rejected. His 2008 reelection bid featured the use of caricatures of himself as a bear. After Typhoon Morakot hit Taiwan in 2009, Lwo was named to a committee specially convened to handle disaster relief. He later became executive director of the Southern Taiwan Joint Services Center, under the purview of the Executive Yuan. It was announced that Lwo had resigned the position in October 2011.
