= Kaohsiung City Constituency 1 =

Constituency of the Legislative Yuan of Taiwan

- Single-member constituency for the Legislative Yuan
- District(s): Taoyuan, Namasia, Jiasian, Liouguei, Shanlin, Neimen, Cishan, Meinong, Maolin, Alian, Tianliao, Yanchao, Dashe, Dashu
- Electorate: 217,467 (2024 election)

Current constituency
- Created: 2008 (as Kaohsiung County Constituency 1); 2010 (current name)
- Party: DPP
- Member: Chiu Yi-ying

Kaohsiung City Constituency 1 (Chinese: 高雄市第一選舉區) is one of the 73 regional constituencies represented in the Legislative Yuan, the national legislature of Taiwan. It was created in 2008 (as Kaohsiung County Constituency 1) following a series of constitutional reforms, and elects one legislator, through first-past-the-post voting, to the Legislative Yuan. It has been represented by Chiu Yi-ying of the Democratic Progressive Party since 2012.

== Legislators ==
Election	Legislator	Party
2008 - 2012	Chung Shao-ho	Kuomintang
2012	Chiu Yi-ying	Democratic Progressive Party

== Election results ==

=== 2008 (Note: Named Kaohsiung County Constituency 1, boundaries unchanged) ===
2008 Taiwanese legislative election: Kaohsiung County 1
Candidate	Party	Votes	%
Chung Shao-ho	Kuomintang	72,309	53.56
Yen Wen-chung	Democratic Progressive Party	61,679	45.68
Chiang Chia-sheng	Civil Party	1,025	0.76
Total		135,013	100.00
Valid votes		135,013	98.38
Invalid/blank votes		2,229	1.62
Total votes		137,242	100.00
Registered voters/turnout		222,141	61.78
Majority		10,603	7.88
Kuomintang win (new seat)			

=== 2012 ===
* denotes the incumbent representative

2012 Taiwanese legislative election: Kaohsiung 1
Candidate	Party	Votes	%	+/–
Chiu Yi-ying	Democratic Progressive Party	89,913	54.31	▲8.63
Chung Shao-ho*	Kuomintang	75,627	45.69	▼7.87
Total		165,540	100.00	–
Valid votes		165,540	98.66	
Invalid/blank votes		2,251	1.34	
Total votes		167,791	100.00	
Registered voters/turnout		223,797	74.97	
Majority		14,286	8.62	
Democratic Progressive Party gain from Kuomintang				

=== 2016 ===
* denotes the incumbent representative

2016 Taiwanese legislative election: Kaohsiung 1
Candidate	Party	Votes	%	+/–
Chiu Yi-ying*	Democratic Progressive Party	87,432	59.02	▲4.71
Chung Yi-chung	Kuomintang	58,689	39.62	▼6.07
Chuang Ting-hsin	Peace Dove Alliance Party	1,346	0.91	NEW
Liu Tzu-lin	Chinese Unification Promotion Party	669	0.45	NEW
Total		148,136	100.00	–
Valid votes		148,136	98.22	
Invalid/blank votes		2,683	1.78	
Total votes		150,819	100.00	
Registered voters/turnout		224,630	67.14	
Majority		28,743	19.4	
Democratic Progressive Party hold				

=== 2020 ===
* denotes the incumbent representative

2020 Taiwanese legislative election: Kaohsiung 1
Candidate	Party	Votes	%	+/–
Chiu Yi-ying*	Democratic Progressive Party	91,561	55.92	▼3.10
Wang Lingjiao	Kuomintang	55,373	33.82	▼5.80
Lo Ting-cheng	Taiwan People's Party	10,661	6.51	NEW
Huang Xiujing	People First Party	5,443	3.32	NEW
Yen Yang-ching	Labor Party	704	0.43	NEW
Total		163,742	100.00	–
Valid votes		163,742	98.21	
Invalid/blank votes		2,989	1.79	
Total votes		166,731	100.00	
Registered voters/turnout		222,799	74.83	
Majority		36,188	22.1	
Democratic Progressive Party hold				

=== 2024 ===
* denotes the incumbent representative

2024 Taiwanese legislative election: Kaohsiung 1
Candidate	Party	Votes	%	+/–
Chiu Yi-ying*	Democratic Progressive Party	79,567	54.67	▼1.25
Lin Yidi	Independent (Kuomintang-affiliated)	42,219	29.01	▼4.81
Tseng Lin-yi	Taiwan People's Party	22,169	15.23	▲8.72
Liu Chengzhi	People's Union Party	1,596	1.10	NEW
Total		145,551	100.00	–
Valid votes		145,551	97.91	
Invalid/blank votes		3,100	2.09	
Total votes		148,651	100.00	
Registered voters/turnout		217,467	68.36	
Majority		37,348	25.66	
Democratic Progressive Party hold				
