= Peng Tien-fu =

Taiwanese politician (1951–2024)

- 彭添富
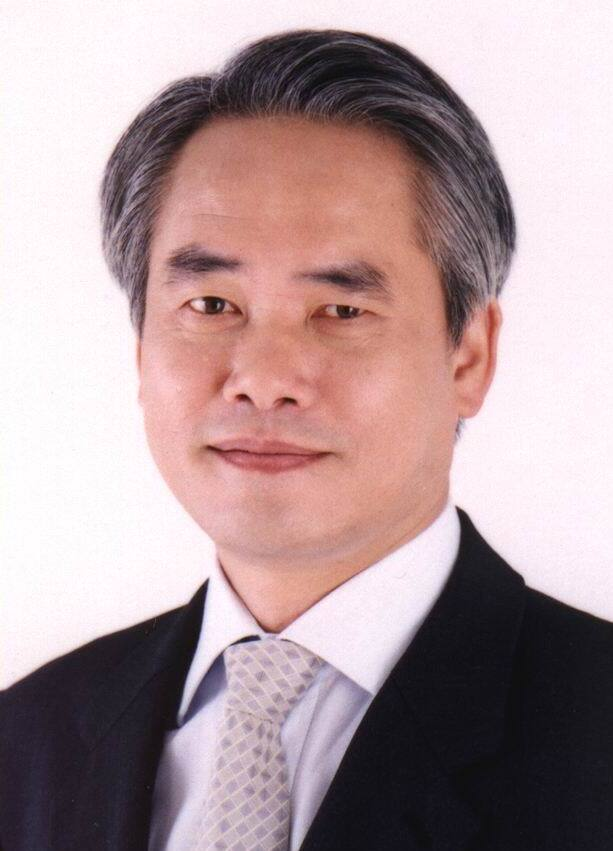
- Peng in 2005

Deputy Minister of the Hakka Affairs Council
- In office 1 February 2008 – 20 May 2008
- Minister: Lee Yung-te
- Preceded by: Chiu Yi-ying

Member of the Legislative Yuan
- In office 1 February 2002 – 31 January 2008
- Constituency: Taoyuan County

Speaker of Taiwan Provincial Consultative Council
- In office 13 June 2000 – 20 December 2001
- Preceded by: Lin Po-jung
- Succeeded by: Fan Chen-tsung

Member of the Taiwan Provincial Consultative Council
- In office 1990–1998

Member of the Taoyuan County Council
- In office 1986–1990

Personal details
- Born: 1 July 1951 Zhongli, Taoyuan County, Taiwan
- Died: 26 November 2024 (aged 73) Zhongli, Taoyuan, Taiwan
- Party: Democratic Progressive Party
- Education: Hwa Hsia University of Technology (BS); Tamkang University (MA); University of Manchester (MPA); Chung Hua University (PhD)

Peng Tien-fu (Chinese: 彭添富; pinyin: Péng Tiānfù; 1 July 1951 – 26 November 2024) was a Taiwanese politician.

== Early life and education ==
Peng was raised in Zhongli, Taoyuan. He was of Hakka descent. After graduating from Hwa Hsia University of Technology with a bachelor's degree in chemical engineering, he earned a master's degree in management from Tamkang University and a Master of Public Administration (M.P.A.) from the University of Manchester. He later earned a Ph.D. in technology management from Chung Hua University. Before pursuing politics, he was a teacher.

== Career ==
Peng was elected to the Taoyuan County Council in 1986 and served until 1990, when he became a member of the Taiwan Provincial Consultative Council. There, Peng served two terms, to 1998. In 2001, he was elected to the Legislative Yuan. Upon losing his second reelection campaign in 2008, Peng was appointed deputy minister of the Hakka Affairs Council. In 2010, he declared his candidacy for a Taoyuan County by-election, but later dropped out, supporting eventual winner Kuo Jung-tsung.

Peng's son Peng Chun-hao has served on the Taoyuan City Council. Peng died on 26 November 2024, at the age of 73. His final political post was national policy adviser to President William Lai.
