= Chiu Yi-ying =

Taiwanese politician (born 1971)

Chiu Yi-ying MLY
- 邱議瑩
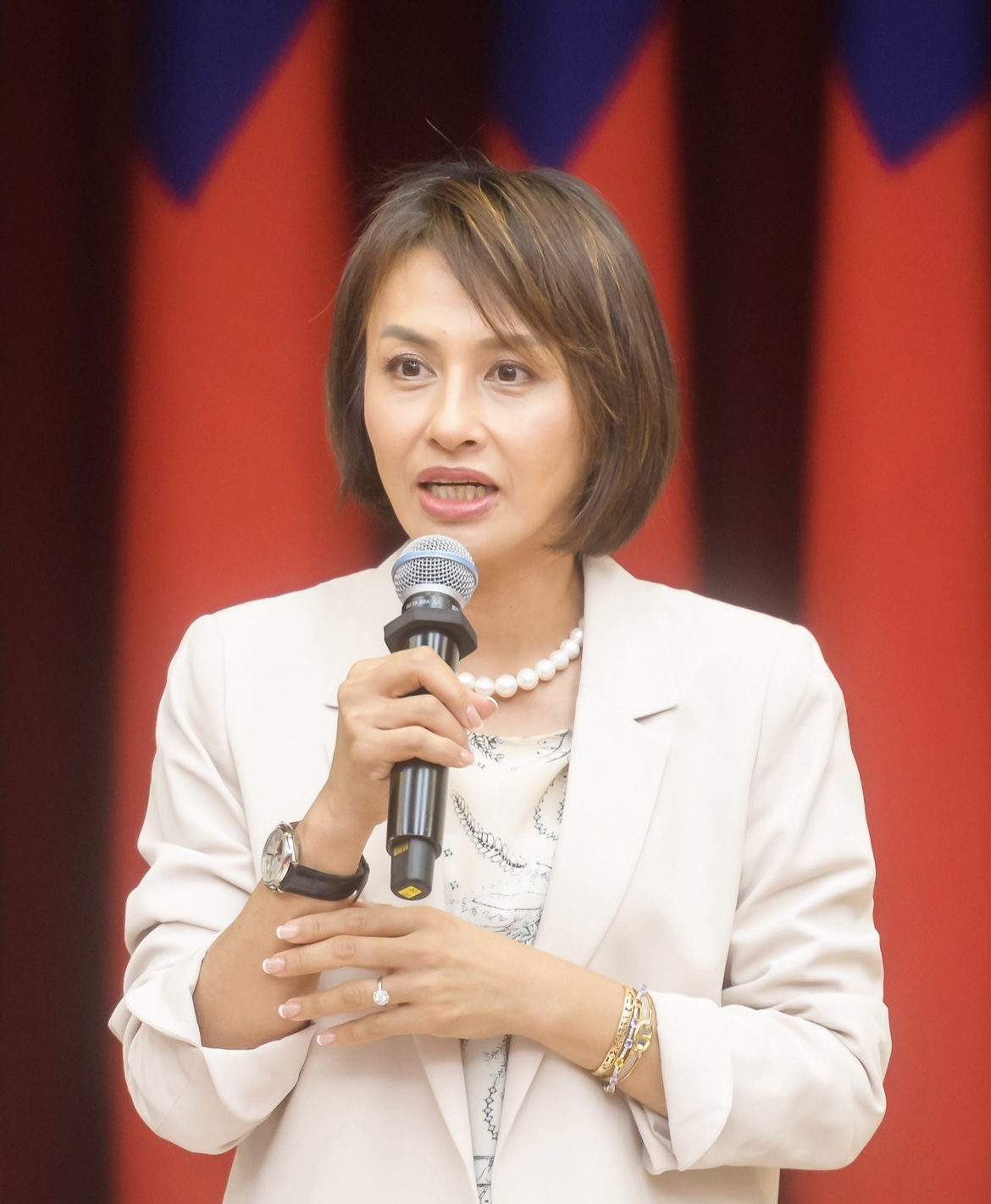
- Chiu in 2023

Member of the Legislative Yuan
- Incumbent
- Assumed office 1 February 2008
- Preceded by: Chung Shao-ho (8th)
- Constituency: Kaohsiung 1 (8-10th)
- Constituency: Party-list (Democratic Progressive Party) (7th)
- In office 1 February 2002 – 31 January 2005
- Constituency: Pingtung County

Deputy Minister of the Hakka Affairs Council
- In office June 2005 – January 2008
- Minister: Lee Yung-te
- Preceded by: Lee Yung-te
- Succeeded by: Peng Tien-fu

Member of the National Assembly
- In office 1996–2000

Personal details
- Born: 1 June 1971 (age 55) Pingtung County, Taiwan
- Party: Democratic Progressive Party
- Spouse: Lee Yung-te (m. 2011)
- Education: Martin College (BA); Dominican University of California (MBA)

Chinese name
- Traditional Chinese: 邱議瑩
- Simplified Chinese: 邱议莹
Transcriptions
Standard Mandarin
- Hanyu Pinyin: Qiū Yìyíng

Chiu Yi-ying (Chinese: 邱議瑩; pinyin: Qiū Yìyíng; born 1 June 1971) is a Taiwanese politician. She has served four terms in the Legislative Yuan, one term in the National Assembly, and, from 2005 to 2008, was the deputy minister of the Hakka Affairs Council.

== Education ==
Chiu earned a bachelor's degree from Martin College in Australia and earned her Master of Business Administration (M.B.A.) from the Dominican University of California in the United States.

== Political career ==
A member of the Democratic Progressive Party, Chiu had been elected to the Central Standing Committee by 2000. In 2016, she became chair of the committee.

Chiu won her first national-level office in 1996, serving on the National Assembly until 2000. Upon taking office, Chiu became the youngest assembly member at age 25. In 2001, she was elected to the Legislative Yuan as a representative of Pingtung County. Chiu was then appointed deputy minister of the Hakka Affairs Council in June 2005. Chiu was placed on the Democratic Progressive Party's proportional representation party list for the 2008 legislative elections and won, necessitating her resignation from the Hakka Affairs Council, where she was replaced by Peng Tien-fu. In 2012, Chiu defeated Kaohsiung 1 incumbent Chung Shao-ho and won reelection in 2016.

2012 Kaohsiung 1 Legislative Yuan Electoral result
Order	Candidate	Party	Votes	Percentage	Elected
1	Chiu Yi-ying	Democratic Progressive Party	89,913	54.32%	
2	Chung Shao-he	Kuomintang	75,627	45.68%	
Eligible voters			223,797		
Votes			167,791		
Valid			165,540		
Invalid			2,251		
Turnout			74.97%		

2016 Kaohsiung 1 Legislative Yuan Electoral result
Order	Candidate	Party	Votes	Percentage	Elected
1	Chiu Yi-ying	Democratic Progressive Party	87,432	59.02%	
2	鍾易仲	Kuomintang	58,689	39.62%	
3	劉子麟	Chinese Reunification Party	669	0.45%	
4	莊婷欣	Peace Dove Alliance Party	1,346	0.91%	
Eligible voters			224,630		
Votes			150,819		
Valid			148,136		
Invalid			2,683		
Turnout			67.14%		

=== Controversy ===
Chiu supported a 2003 amendment to Taiwanese copyright law that was unpopular with rapper Jeff Huang. Huang wrote a song titled "Retribution" about the amendment's supporters, two of whom, Chiu and Chang Hsueh-shun, sued him for libel. The Taipei District Court ruled in May 2007 that Huang was not guilty of libel.

Chiu has been involved in many altercations on the floor of the Legislative Yuan. In April 2009, Lee Ching-hua called Chiu a shrew, and in response, she hit him. In another instance, Chiu attempted to unplug a loudspeaker Kuomintang legislators were using to disrupt a review of the Cross-Strait Service Trade Agreement, while Chiang Kui-fang tried to stop her. While meeting as a member of the legislature's economics committee in November 2016, Chiu was overheard saying there was "no use talking to these huan-a," using a derogatory Hokkien word to refer to Kuomintang aboriginal representatives. She later apologized. In July 2017, Chiu attempted to break up a group of Kuomintang lawmakers who were protesting the Forward-looking Infrastructure Development Program. Hsu Shu-hua slapped Chiu across the face. Chiu responded by pulling her hair. Chiu later engaged Lee Yen-hsiu, Lin Te-fu, and Huang Chao-shun.

== Personal life and family ==
Chiu's grandfather Chiu Ching-te was a member of the Pingtung County Assembly and served two terms as Pingtung City mayor. Her father, Chiu Mao-nan, was elected to the Pingtung County Council, and, in 1977, bid for the mayoralty of Pingtung, before withdrawing from the Kuomintang and abandoning the campaign. Another relative, Chiu Lien-hui, was active Pingtung County politics from 1959 to 1996. Chiu Yi-ying's younger brother Chiu Ming-chang is also a politician.

During her political career, Chiu and fellow legislators Hsiao Bi-khim and Cheng Li-chun gained the nickname "the S.H.E of the DPP."

Chiu Yi-ying married Lee Yung-te in April 2011, whom she had met while serving on the Hakka Affairs Council. Later that year, she was diagnosed with ovarian cancer. To maintain her health, Chiu began jogging, juicing, and cut red meat from her diet. In January 2013, Chiu and Lee held their wedding banquet, which had been postponed due to the 2012 election cycle and Chiu's cancer treatment.
