= Lu Li'an =

Chinese professor and politician

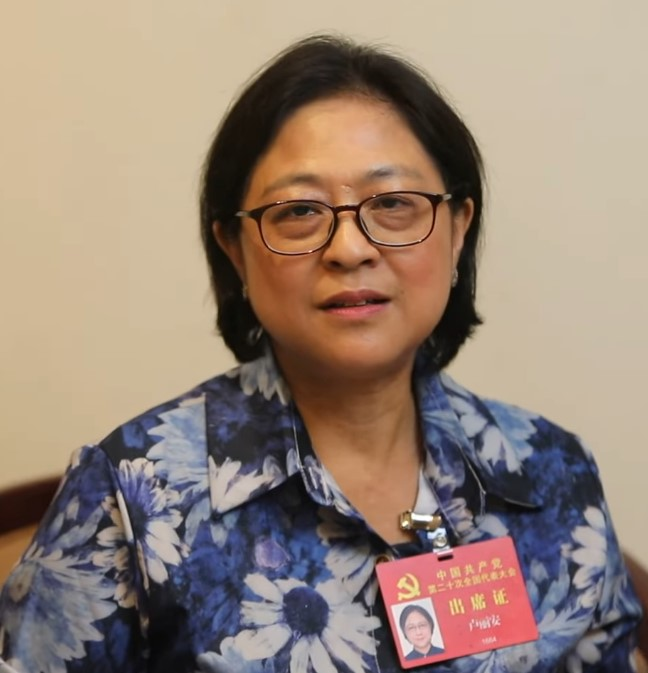
- Lu Li'an in October 2022

Personal details
- Born: 1968 (age 57–58) Cishan Township, Kaohsiung County, Taiwan
- Party: Communist Party of China (2015–present)
- Education: National Chengchi University (bachelor's degree); University of Edinburgh (master's degree); University of Glasgow (PhD)

Lu Li'an (simplified Chinese: 卢丽安; traditional Chinese: 盧麗安; pinyin: Lú Lì'ān, born in 1968) is a scholar of British literature, professor at Fudan University, and president of the Shanghai Taiwan Compatriots Friendship Association. Born in Taiwan, she moved to mainland China in 1997 to teach at Fudan University in Shanghai and became a citizen of the People's Republic of China (PRC). In 2017, she was a delegate to the 19th National Congress of the Communist Party of China, and the same year, the Republic of China (ROC) government revoked her registered residency in Taiwan.

== Early life and education ==
Lu was born in Cishan, Kaohsiung, Taiwan. Her father, Lu Jianzhi (盧建志), was a doctor and director of the Ministry of Health and Welfare Pingtung Hospital. Her mother, Jiang Meiying (蔣美櫻), was a teacher at Cishan Junior High.

Lu's paternal grandfather, Lu Laozhi (盧老枝), was a well known figure in Cishan during the period of Japanese rule due to an incident that reportedly happened during World War II when he was studying in Japan. At a military parade in Tokyo, a Japanese flag fell under one of the vehicles. Lu Laozhi made the vehicle stop and crawled underneath to pull the flag out, drawing a round of applause, newspaper coverage, and later on even a mention in Japanese primary school textbooks. After returning to Taiwan, Lu Laozhi became the principal of Cishan Junior High.

Lu Li'an attended Kaohsiung Municipal Kaohsiung Girls' Senior High School. In September 1986 she started studying at Taiwan's National Chengchi University, and in June 1990 she graduated from NCCU's Department of Western Languages and Literature (later renamed the Department of English). From September 1991 to December 1992, she got her master's degree from the English literature department at the University of Edinburgh in the UK. In September 1993, she started a PhD program in English literature at the University of Glasgow, and she graduated in December 1999. While in the UK, she met Shen Yifan (沈一帆), born in Taichung but of mainland Chinese descent, who was a PhD student at the University of Edinburgh. They were married in a no-frills civil ceremony.

== Career ==
In 1997, Lu and her husband accepted an invitation from the Chinese Ministry of Human Resources to move to Shanghai as "experts returning to China to settle" (返国定居专家). She joined Fudan University's College of Foreign Languages and Literature, where she was a lecturer from 1997 to February 2001, an associate professor from March 2001 to December 2013, and a full professor starting in December 2013. Her areas of research include British literature, twentieth-century British novels, gender studies, feminism, sociology of literature, life writing, and Hans Christian Andersen. From September 2009 to June 2010, she undertook advanced studies on a Fulbright scholarship at the Institute for Research on Women and Gender and the English department of the University of Michigan.

In 2003 Lu became a member of the Shanghai Political Bureau. She has served as a member of the Political Consultative Conference Shanghai committee and the Shanghai Women's League. In September 2013, she became president of the Shanghai Taiwan Compatriots Friendship Association, while continuing to work as a professor, PhD supervisor, and assistant dean. In 2015 she joined the Communist Party.

At the Communist Party's National Conference of Taiwan Province Party Members from 19 to 21 June 2017, Lu was one of ten delegates elected to represent Taiwan Province at the 19th National Congress of the Communist Party of China. She was the only delegate who was born and raised in Taiwan, the other nine being of Taiwanese descent but mainland born. In October 2017, Lu attended the 19th National Congress as a delegate and took questions from the media. She said she was "proud to be a daughter of Taiwan and proud to be Chinese", and argued that there is no contradiction between "loving Taiwan and loving the mainland". On 5 October, Katharine Chang, minister of Taiwan's Mainland Affairs Council, confirmed that Lu had been born in Taiwan and had obtained PRC citizenship and said that the Taiwanese government respected her decision. On 26 October, the Taiwanese government indicated that Lu and her son's ROC residency (戶籍) had been revoked (her husband's residency had already been revoked in 2015).

Lu received a 2017 "Touching China" (感动中国) award.

She was a delegate to the 20th National Congress of the Communist Party of China.

== Partial bibliography ==
=== Journal articles in Taiwan ===
- "What Is a 'Woman'?: Exploring Virginia Woolf's 'Professions for Women' and the Social-historical Implications of the 'Angel in the House' Image" (Chinese: 何謂「女性」？：從伍爾芙〈女性的職業〉談「家庭天使」形象的銘刻意義), Sun Yat-sen Journal of Humanities, volume 30, pp. 217–234，January 2011.

=== Journal articles in mainland China ===
- 四位十九大党代表在研讨会上的发言摘编 ("Extracts from Seminar Lectures of Four Delegates to the 19th National Party Congress"), Modern Communication, issue 1, 2018 (with Jing Haipeng, Zhou Yu, and Meng Xiangfei).
- 一堂难忘的党课 ("An Unforgettable Party Lecture"), Shanghai Education, volume 33, 2017.
- 从〈孤寂深渊〉与〈奥兰多〉浅探20世纪初期英国的性别空间创建 ("Exploring the Construction of Gender Space in Early 20th Century Britain through The Well of Loneliness and Orlando"), Social Science Research, issue 1, 2014 (with Bao Ying).
- 〈哈姆莱特〉的历史问题:〈哈姆莱特〉与现代早期英格兰的政治性别关联 ("The Historical Problem of Hamlet: Connections between Hamlet and Political Gender Relations in Early Modern England")，Foreign Literature Review, issue 3, 2013.
- "Revamping Robinson Crusoe", English and American Literary Studies, Shanghai Foreign Language Education Press, 2007.
- 一个解构性的镶嵌混成:〈仇敌〉与笛福小说 ("A Deconstructive Mosaic: Foe and Defoe's Novel"), Contemporary Foreign Literature, issue 4, 2004 (with Duan Feng).

=== Translations ===
- The Art of Fiction by David Lodge, translated as 小说的艺术. Shanghai Translation Publishing House, 2010.
- "The Grief of Strangers" by Chimamanda Ngozi Adichie, translated as 陌生人的悲伤, 2007.

== See also ==
- Chen Yunying
- Justin Yifu Lin
- Morris Chang
- Cross-Strait relations
