= Liu Hsien-tong =

Taiwanese politician (born 1952)

Liu Hsien-tong MLY
- 劉憲同

Member of the Legislative Yuan
- In office 1 February 1999 – 31 January 2002
- Constituency: Kaohsiung 1

Personal details
- Born: 24 March 1952 (age 74)
- Party: Democratic Progressive Party (since 2002)
- Other political affiliations: Kuomintang (until 2002)
- Education: Feng Chia University

Liu Hsien-tong (Chinese: 劉憲同; born 24 March 1952) is a Taiwanese politician who served in the Legislative Yuan from 1999 to 2002. He joined the Democratic Progressive Party shortly after stepping down from the legislature.
