= Fortune Institute of Technology =

College in Kaohsiung, Taiwan

- 和春技術學院
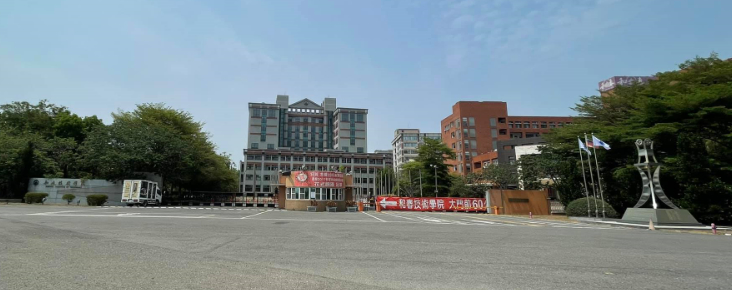
- Former names: Fortune Junior College of Industry; Fortune Junior College of Technology and Commerce
- Type: Private college
- Active: 5 July 1989 (as Fortune Junior College of Industry); 1999 (as FIT)–2023
- Location: Daliao and Cishan, Kaohsiung, Taiwan; 22°36′26″N 120°25′38″E
- Campus: 3

Fortune Institute of Technology
- Traditional Chinese: 和春技術學院
Transcriptions
Standard Mandarin
- Hanyu Pinyin: Héchūn Jìshù Xuéyuàn
Southern Min
- Hokkien POJ: Hô-chhun Ki-su̍t Ha̍k-īⁿ

Fortune Institute of Technology (FIT; Chinese: 和春技術學院; Pe̍h-ōe-jī: Hô-chhun Ki-su̍t Ha̍k-īⁿ) was a private university in Daliao District and Cishan District of Kaohsiung, Taiwan.

== History ==
FIT was founded on 5 July 1989 as Fortune Junior College of Industry in Cishan Township, Kaohsiung County. In 1991, it was renamed Fortune Junior College of Technology and Commerce. In 1998, the Daliao Campus was established in Daliao Township. In 1999, the junior college was upgraded as Fortune Institute of Technology. In 2002, the second campus in of Daliao Campus was established and was subsequently renamed Dafa Campus. In 2019, the collage had an enrollment rate of 58.10%. In September 2022, the Ministry of Education ordered the university to close by May 2023 due to poor financial and academic performances.

== Campuses ==
- Dafa Campus
- Daliao Campus
- Chishan Campus

== Faculties ==
- College of Business and Management
- College of Design
- College of Electrical and Computer Engineering
- College of Food and Beverage Management

== See also ==
- List of universities in Taiwan
