= Shanlin District =

District in Kaohsiung, Taiwan

Coordinates: 23.000432°N 120.562538°E

Shanlin 杉林區
- District
- Shanlin District
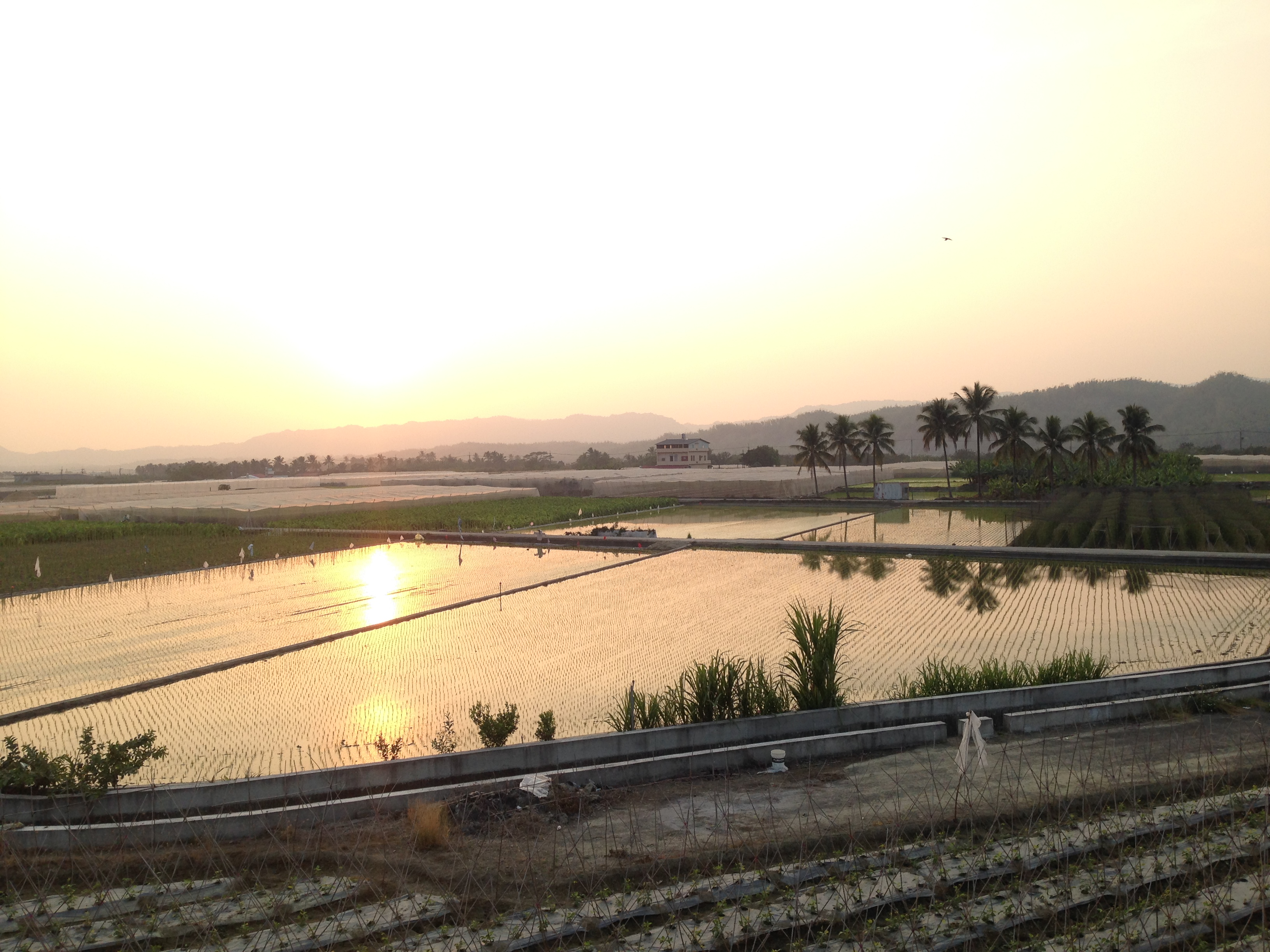
- The sunset in Shanlin.

- Shanlin District in Kaohsiung City
- Country: Taiwan
- Region: Southern Taiwan

Population (October 2023)
  - Total: 10,961
- Website: shanlin.kcg.gov.tw/en/

Shanlin District (Chinese: 杉林區; Hanyu Pinyin: Shānlín Qū; Tongyong Pinyin: Shanlín Cyu; Wade–Giles: Shanlin Ch'ü; Taiwanese: Sam-nâ-khu), formerly known as Lâm-á-sian (楠梓仙) before 1901, later named Suannsamna (山杉林), is a suburban district of Kaohsiung in southern Taiwan.

Shanlin borders Jiasian District to the north, Liougui District to the east, and is adjacent to Meinong District and Cishan District to the south. It shares its western border with Neimen District and connects to Nanhua District in Tainan City to the northwest.

The majority of the district's residents are Hakka people, constituting approximately 63% of the total population, with additional villages of Hoklo and indigenous Taivoan people.

== History ==
After the handover of Taiwan from Japan to the Republic of China in 1945, Shanlin was organized as a rural township of Kaohsiung County. On 25 December 2010, Kaohsiung County was merged with Kaohsiung City and Shanlin was upgraded to a district of the city.

In August 2019, some residents living in high-risk areas of Shanlin District were evacuated from their homes after heavy rain and flash flooding.

== Quick facts ==
- Area: 104.0036 km^{2}.
- Population: 10,961 people (October 2023)
- Divisions: 7 urban villages 142 Neighborhoods
- Postal Code: 846
- Households: 4,717 (October 2023)

== Administrative divisions ==
The district is divided into Shanlin, Muzi, Jilai, Xinzhuang, Shangping, Yuemei, Yuemei and Da-ai/Da'ai Village.

== Education ==
=== High school ===
- Kaohsiung Municipal Shanlin National High School

=== Primary Schools ===
- Shanlin National Primary School
- Yuemeimin Primary School
- Xinzhuang National Primary School
- Shangping National Primary School
- Chilai National Elementary School
- Kaohsiung City Bananhua Tribe Elementary School in Da'ai Village

== Tourist attractions ==
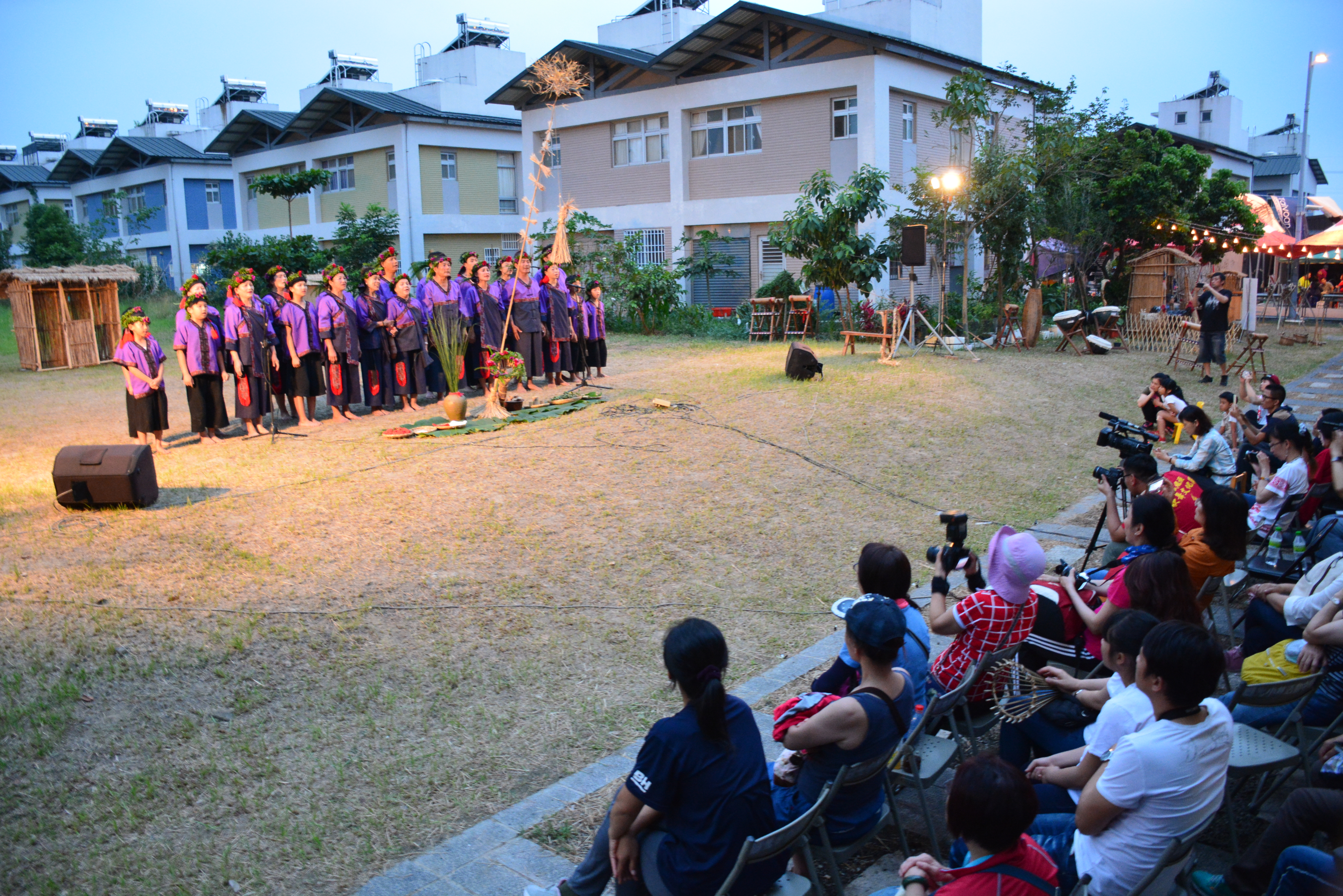
Taivoan cultural performance on Taivoan Cultural Festival held in Sunlight Siaolin in 2018.

- Baishueicyuan Waterfall
- Gourd Sculpture Museum
- Shanlin Confucius Temple (新庒孔聖廟)
- Sunlight Siaolin: A Taivoan community from Siaolin Village in Jiasian District formerly, relocated after Typhoon Morakot in 2009. It currently developed with a focus on indigenous tourism and agricultural products.
- Yuemei Leshan Temple (月眉樂善堂)
- Yuemei Bridge

== Transportation ==
A shuttle taxi system named Happy Taxi was introduced to both Yuemei Villages of the district on 27 May 2019, the first public transport in the district.

== Notable natives ==
- Lin Yu-fang, member of Legislative Yuan (2008-2016)

== See also ==
- Kaohsiung
