= Former Dinglinzihbian Police Station =

Police station in Linyuan, Kaohsiung, Taiwan

- 原頂林仔邊警察官吏派出所
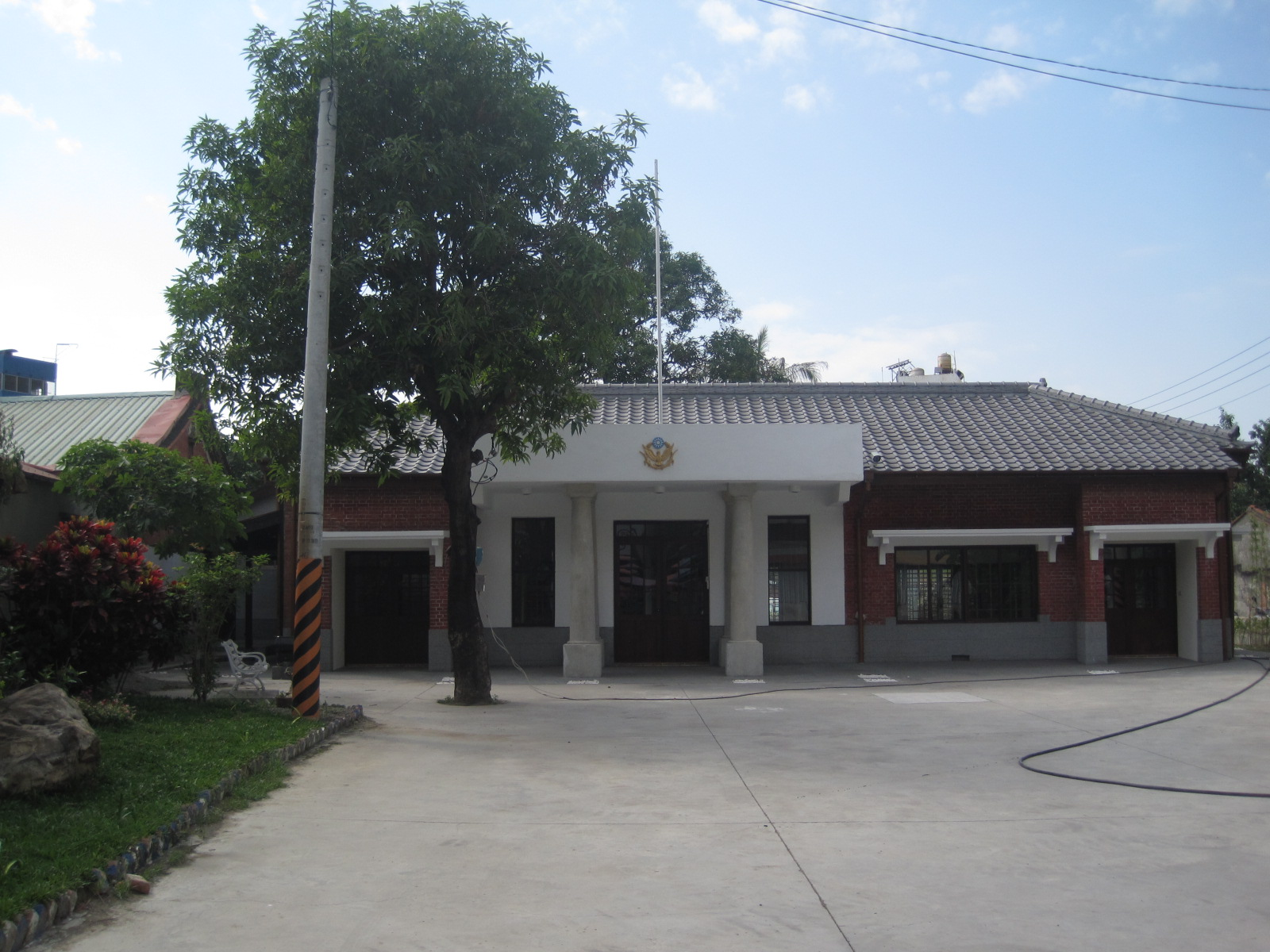
- Interactive map of the Former Dinglinzihbian Police Station area

General information
- Type: former police station
- Location: Linyuan, Kaohsiung, Taiwan
- Coordinates: 22°30′17.9″N 120°23′39.6″E
- Completed: February 1898
- Renovated: 1909

The Former Dinglinzihbian Police Station (traditional Chinese: 原頂林仔邊警察官吏派出所; simplified Chinese: 原顶林仔边警察官吏派出所; pinyin: Yuán Dǐnglínzǐbiān Jǐngchá Guānlì Pàichūsuǒ) is a historical building in Linyuan District, Kaohsiung, Taiwan.

== History ==
The police station building was originally built in February 1898 as Yuan Dinglinzibian Police Station at Fusing Street. Soon, public school, market and township office were set up around the neighborhood, turning the area into a political and economic center for Linyuan. In 1907, it was renamed Linzibian Police Station and underwent renovation in 1909 as what it is today. After the handover of Taiwan from Japan to the Republic of China in 1945, the government took over the police station and put it under the administration of Fongshan District. In 1958, it was restructured as Linyuan Police Station. In 1989, the police station was relocated to its current address at Linyuan North Road due to space congestion at Fusing Street. Ever since, the abandoned building served as police dormitory building with parts of the building remained unoccupied.

In 2007, the Bureau of Cultural Affairs declared the former police station as a historical building. The building then went renovation and reparation which was completed in 2009.

== Architecture ==
The building stands on a 4,620 m^{2} of land. The original police station building consisted of dormitory, garden, ancient wall, cistern and air raid shelter or detention area. It is a one-story Japanese-style building design with bricks and wooden materials.

== See also ==
- List of tourist attractions in Taiwan
