= Qishan railway station (Taiwan) =

Former railway station in Qishan, Kaohsiung, Taiwan

Qishan Station 旗山車站
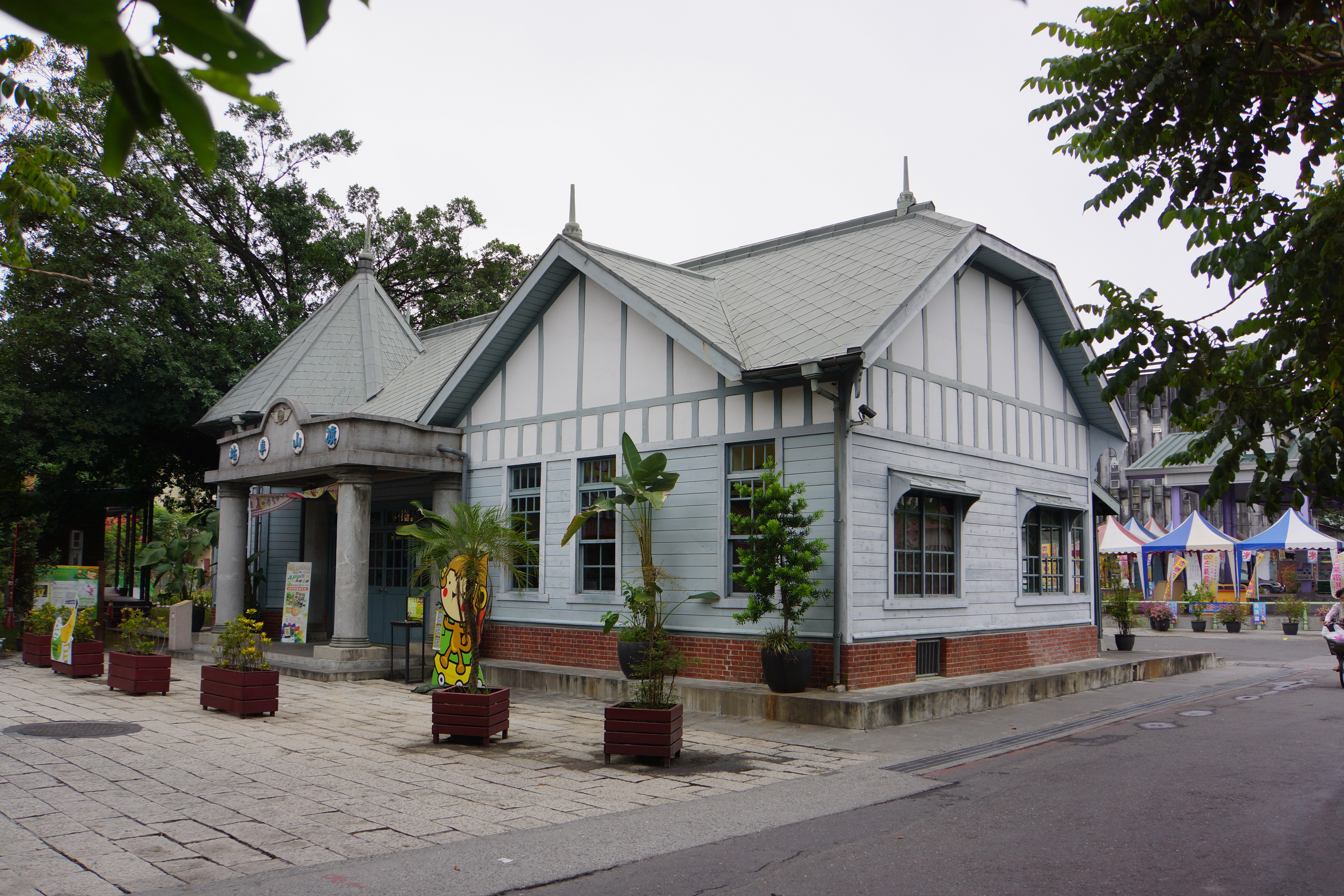

General information
- Location: Cishan, Kaohsiung, Taiwan
- Coordinates: 22°53′04.2″N 120°28′55.2″E
- System: Former train station
- Line: Qiwei Branch Line

History
- Opened: 1912
- Closed: 1978
Location

Qishan Station (traditional Chinese: 旗山車站; simplified Chinese: 旗山车站; pinyin: Qíshān Chēzhàn) is a former train station in Cishan District, Kaohsiung, Taiwan.

== History ==
The station was originally built by the Japanese government in Taiwan in 1912 to transport sugar cane, rice, bananas and people along the Qiwei Branch line. In the following decade, the railway began to serve passengers. The railway was decommissioned in 1978 with only the station buildings left intact.

Formally abandoned in 1982, it was designated a municipal historic building in 2005, then underwent renovation and was reopened on 27 July 2009 as a tourist attraction in a ceremony attended by Kaohsiung County Magistrate Yang Chiu-hsing.

== Architecture ==
The 1-story station building is made of wood and has an octagonal shape. Its style was influenced by Tudor architecture.

== Features ==
Around the station is the Qishan Old Street, Qishan Cultural Park, and Qishan Elementary School.

== See also ==
- Shengxing Station
