= Linyuan District =

District in Kaohsiung, Taiwan

Coordinates: 22.5°N 120.4°E

Linyuan 林園區
- District
- Linyuan District
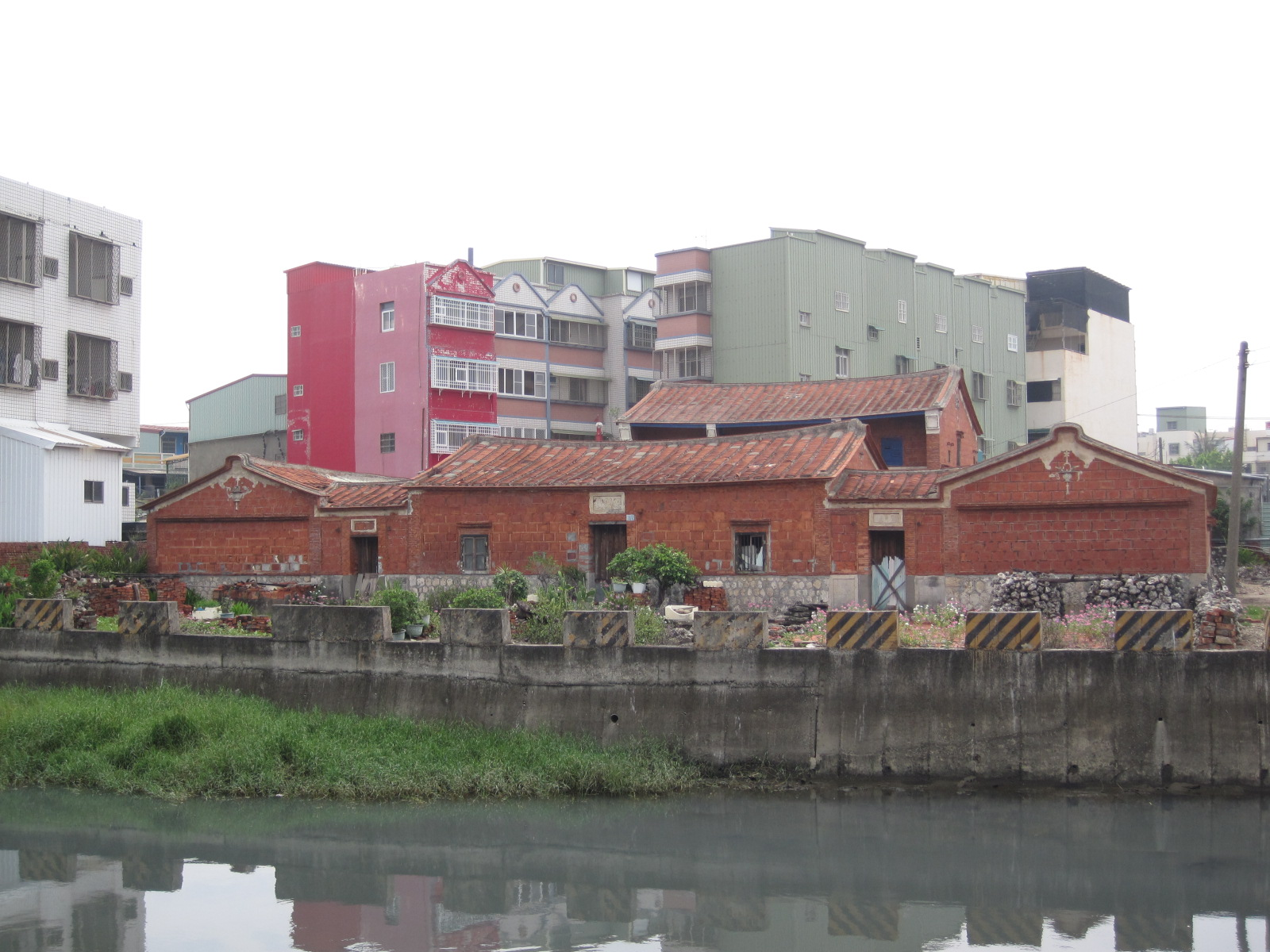
- Linyuan District

- Linyuan District in Kaohsiung City
- Country: Taiwan
- Region: Southern Taiwan

Population (October 2023)
  - Total: 68,299
- Website: linyuan.kcg.gov.tw/en/

Linyuan District (Chinese: 林園區; pinyin: Línyuán Qū) is a suburban district of Kaohsiung, Taiwan. It has 68,299 inhabitants in October 2023. It is the southernmost district of the city.

== History ==
The prehistory era of the district can be traced back to the artifacts found at the Fengbitou Archaeological Site.

=== Ming dynasty ===
The district used to be the administrative, commercial and cultural center of Xiaozhu Li during the Ming dynasty.

=== Qing dynasty ===
During the Qing dynasty, Xiaozhu Li was renamed Xiaozhu Upper Li and Xiaozhu Lower Li.

=== Republic of China ===
After the handover of Taiwan from Japan to the Republic of China in 1945, Linyuan was organized as a rural township of Kaohsiung County. On 25 December 2010, Kaohsiung County was merged with Kaohsiung City and Linyuan was upgraded to a district of the city.

== Geography ==
This district is part of Kaohsiung built up area which encompasses 10 cities (or districts) out of 18 in official Kaohsiung Metro Area.

== Administrative divisions ==
The district consists of Beishan, Dingcuo, Fengyun, Gangpu, Gangzui, Gongcuo, Guangying, Linjia, Linnei, Linyuan, Renai, Tantou, Tunglin, Tungshan, Wanggong, Wenxian, Wufu, Xishan, Xixi, Xizhou, Zhongcuo, Zhongmen, Zhongshan and Zhongyun Village.

== Tourist attractions ==
- Cingshueiyan Scenic Area
- Cingshuei Temple (清水寺), founded in 1666
- Fengbitou Archaeological Site
- Fongshan Reservoir
- Former Dinglinzihbian Police Station
- Fude Temple (福德廟), founded in 1749
- Guangying Temple (廣應廟), founded in 1787
- Huang Family Historical Residence
- Huang Fong-an Drugstore
- Linyuan Cingshueiyan Former Japanese Military Tunnel
- Linyuan Ocean Wetland Park
- Linyuan Old Street
- Old Police Department
- Shuangyuan Bridge
- Sinji Temple (興濟宮), founded in 1661
- Yishihyuan Herb Garden

== See also ==
- Kaohsiung
