= Pān-toh =

Traditional Taiwanese-style banquet

- Traditional Chinese: 辦桌
Transcriptions
Standard Mandarin
- Hanyu Pinyin: ban4 zhuo1
Southern Min
- Tâi-lô: pān-toh

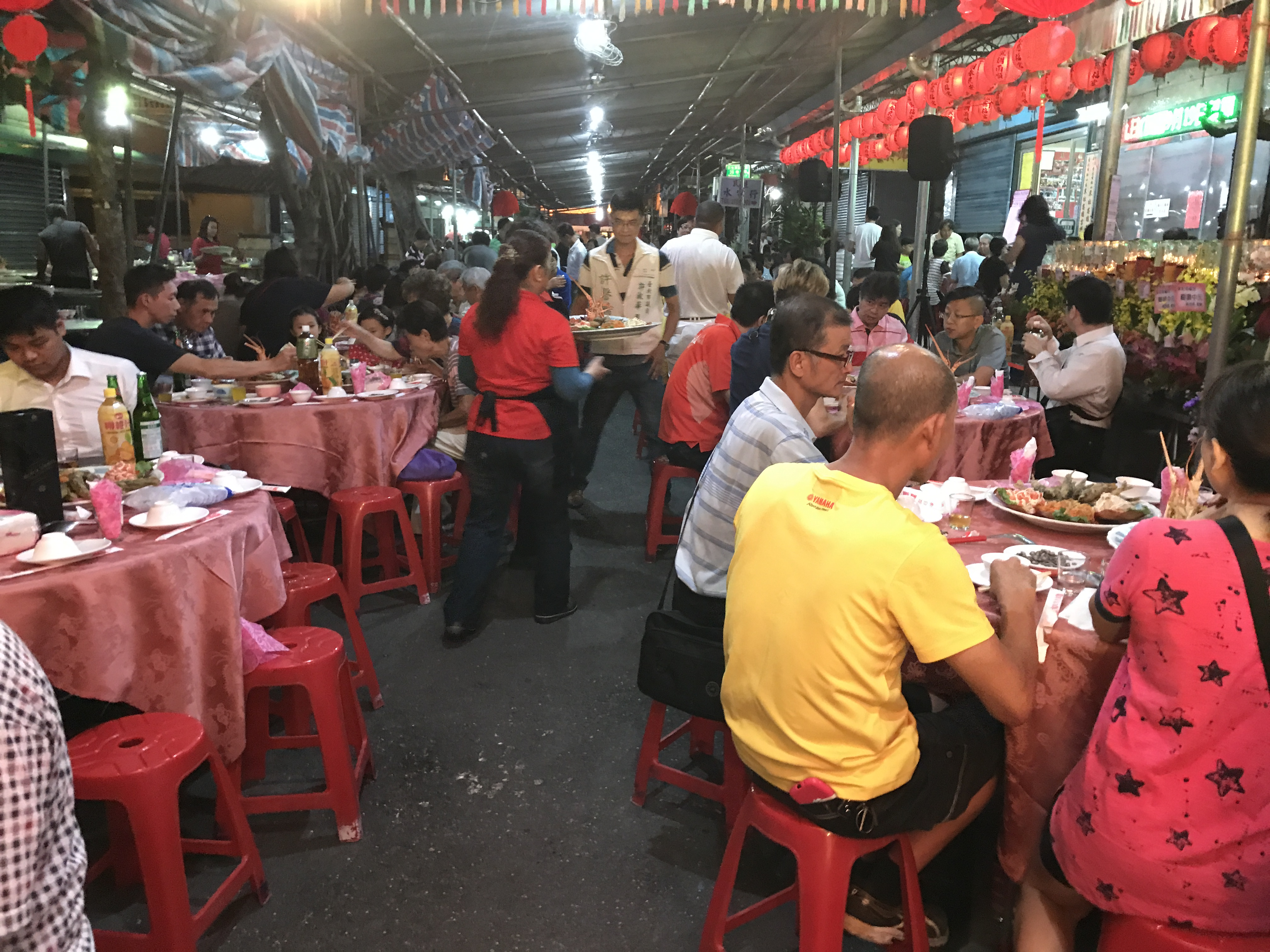
A roadside banquet in Taipei

A pān-toh or roadside banquet (literally 'to arrange tables') is a traditional Taiwanese-style banquet. The phrase also refers to a form of catering business. Many well-known Taiwanese dishes originated in roadside banquet culture. Taiwanese people like to hold roadside banquets. Friends and family gather to celebrate important events in life, such as weddings, housewarming parties, newborn's one month celebration, farewell parties, company year-end parties and religious celebrations. Roadside banquets often take place under huge tents set up beside roads. People also host these banquets at the squares in front of temples, at sports fields in schools or in local community centers. There will be stoves and kitchen counters in the tents, so the food can be cooked on location. Then the participants can enjoy the feast together.

== Staff and customs ==
In roadside banquets, there will be a chef in charge of the preparation of food and the management of the event and several “sous chefs”, usually apprentices. Beside professional cooks, some temporary helpers will come and help prepare ingredients, washing dishes, serving and cleaning.

Many rituals and regulations need to be followed in roadside banquets, such as the course selection, the serving order and the seating.

== History ==
The history of roadside banquets can be traced back to the Qing dynasty. At that time, only the wealthy families were able to invite a chef and host a private banquet at home. When Taiwan was under Japanese colonial rule, professional catering was provided by restaurants. Events resembling roadside banquets also emerged in countryside. However, these banquets were not professionalized. The host would provide tableware, stoves, firewood, tables and chairs, and the dishes were managed by locals who were good at cooking and served by the guests themselves.

Modern Roadside banquet arose in the 1970s and reached its peak in the 1980s. Neimen District in Kaohsiung County is known as the capital of roadside banquets. In 2005, there were more than 150 roadside banquet chefs, meaning that one in every five households in that neighborhood were involved in the catering business. In 2001, the Tourism Bureau listed the roadside banquet festival in Neimen district as one of the biggest local festivals in Taiwan.
