= Linyuan Cingshueiyan Former Japanese Military Tunnel =

Tunnel in Linyuan, Kaohsiung, Taiwan

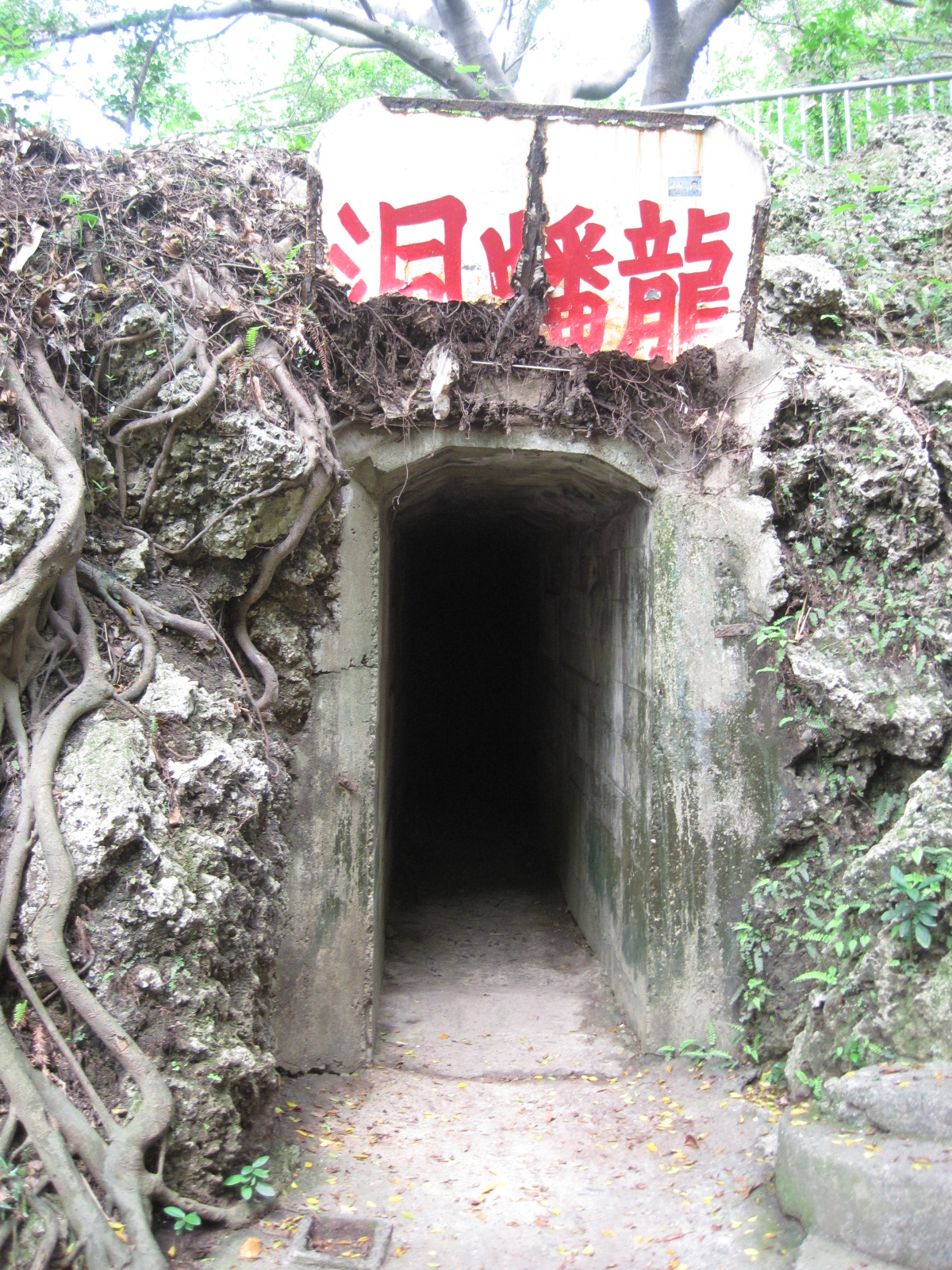
- Interactive map of Linyuan Cingshueiyan Former Japanese Military Tunnel

Overview
- Official name: 清水巖原日軍戰備坑道
- Location: Linyuan, Kaohsiung, Taiwan
- Coordinates: 22°31′32.9″N 120°23′20.2″E

Operation
- Opened: 1943

The Linyuan Cingshueiyan Former Japanese Military Tunnel (traditional Chinese: 清水巖原日軍戰備坑道; simplified Chinese: 清水岩原日军战备坑道; pinyin: Qīngshuǐ Yányuán Rìjūn Zhànbèi Kēngdào) is a tunnel in Fongshan Hill, Linyuan District, Kaohsiung, Taiwan.

== History ==
The tunnel was built in 1943 by the Imperial Japanese Army during the Japanese rule of Taiwan to fend off the landing of United States Armed Forces.

== Geology ==
The tunnel stretches from Linnei Village through Fongshan Ciouling and ends in Fongbitou in Jhongmen Village. Part of the tunnel which is largely intact is around the Longpan Cave.

== See also ==
- List of tourist attractions in Taiwan
