= Linyuan Ocean Wetland Park =

Wetland in Linyuan, Kaohsiung, Taiwan

- 林園海洋溼地公園 (Chinese)
- Location within Kaohsiung
- Location: Linyuan, Kaohsiung, Taiwan
- Coordinates: 22°29′27.3″N 120°23′10.4″E
- Type: wetland
- Surface area: 50 hectares (120 acres)

Linyuan Ocean Wetland Park (traditional Chinese: 林園海洋溼地公園; simplified Chinese: 林园海洋湿地公园; pinyin: Línyuán Hǎiyáng Shīdì Gōngyuán) is a wetland in Linyuan District, Kaohsiung, Taiwan.

== Geography ==
Located at Gaoping river mouth estuary, the wetland spreads over an area of 50 hectares. The wetland consists of 10 species of marine creatures.

== See also ==
- Geography of Taiwan
