= Luo Chuan-chin =

Taiwanese politician

Luo Chuan-chin MLY
- 羅傳進

Member of the Legislative Yuan
- In office 1 February 1993 – 31 January 1999
- Constituency: Republic of China
- In office 1 February 1984 – 31 January 1993
- Constituency: Fishing

Personal details
- Party: Kuomintang
- Children: Lwo Shih-hsiung
- Education: National Chung Hsing University
- Occupation: politician

Luo Chuan-chin (Chinese: 羅傳進) is a Taiwanese politician. He was a member of the Legislative Yuan between 1984 and 1999.

His son Lwo Shih-hsiung was a legislator from 2002 to 2008.
