= Huang Family Historical Residence =

Former house in Linyuan, Kaohsiung, Taiwan

- 林園港埔黃家古厝
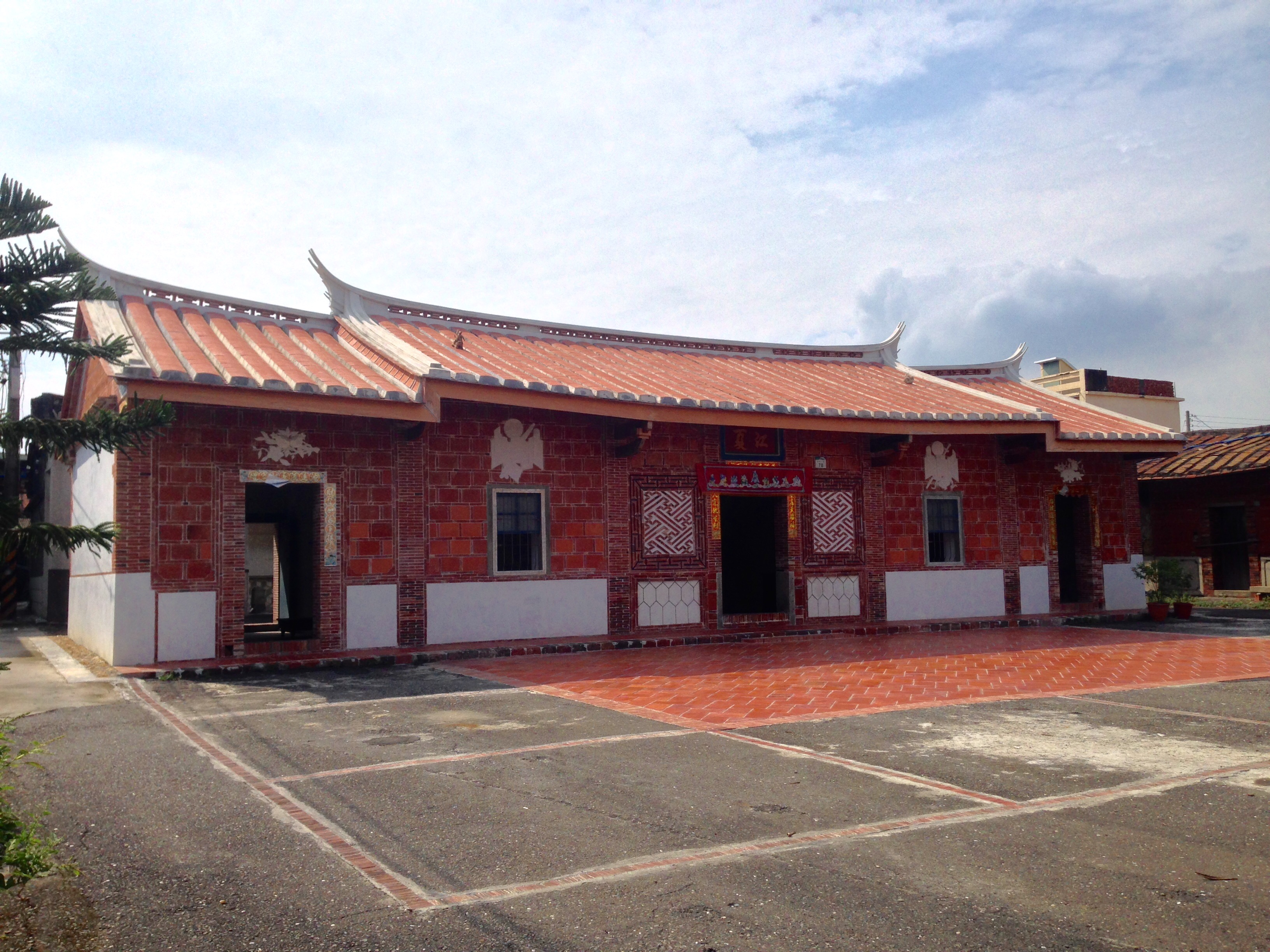
- Interactive map of the Huang Family Historical Residence area

General information
- Type: former house
- Architectural style: Southern Fujian
- Location: Linyuan, Kaohsiung, Taiwan
- Coordinates: 22°29′46.1″N 120°22′49.5″E
- Completed: 1834
- Destroyed: 1977

Technical details
- Grounds: 5 hectares

The Huang Family Historical Residence (traditional Chinese: 林園港埔黃家古厝; simplified Chinese: 林园港埔黄家古厝; pinyin: Línyuán Gǎngbù Huángjiā Gǔcuò) is a historical house in Ganpu Village, Linyuan District, Kaohsiung, Taiwan.

== History ==
The house was constructed in 1834 by the Huang family who migrated to Taiwan from Fujian in the 18th century. In 1977, the house was damaged by Typhoon Thelma and was later renovated. The house was declared a historical building on 15 December 2003 because of its significant value to understand the development of the village. In March 2016, an opening ceremony was held to mark the end of renovation and the opening to the public.

== Architecture ==
The house was constructed with the southern Fujian architectural style with five layers which spreads over an area of five hectares. The house has five halls with three wings on the left and nine wings on the right. The wings on the left and right are connected to the first main hall. The central room used to be the place for worship.

== See also ==
- List of tourist attractions in Taiwan
