= Tengjhih National Forest Recreation Area =

Forest in Taoyuan, Kaohsiung, Taiwan

Tengjhih National Forest Recreation Area Chinese: 藤枝國家森林遊樂區
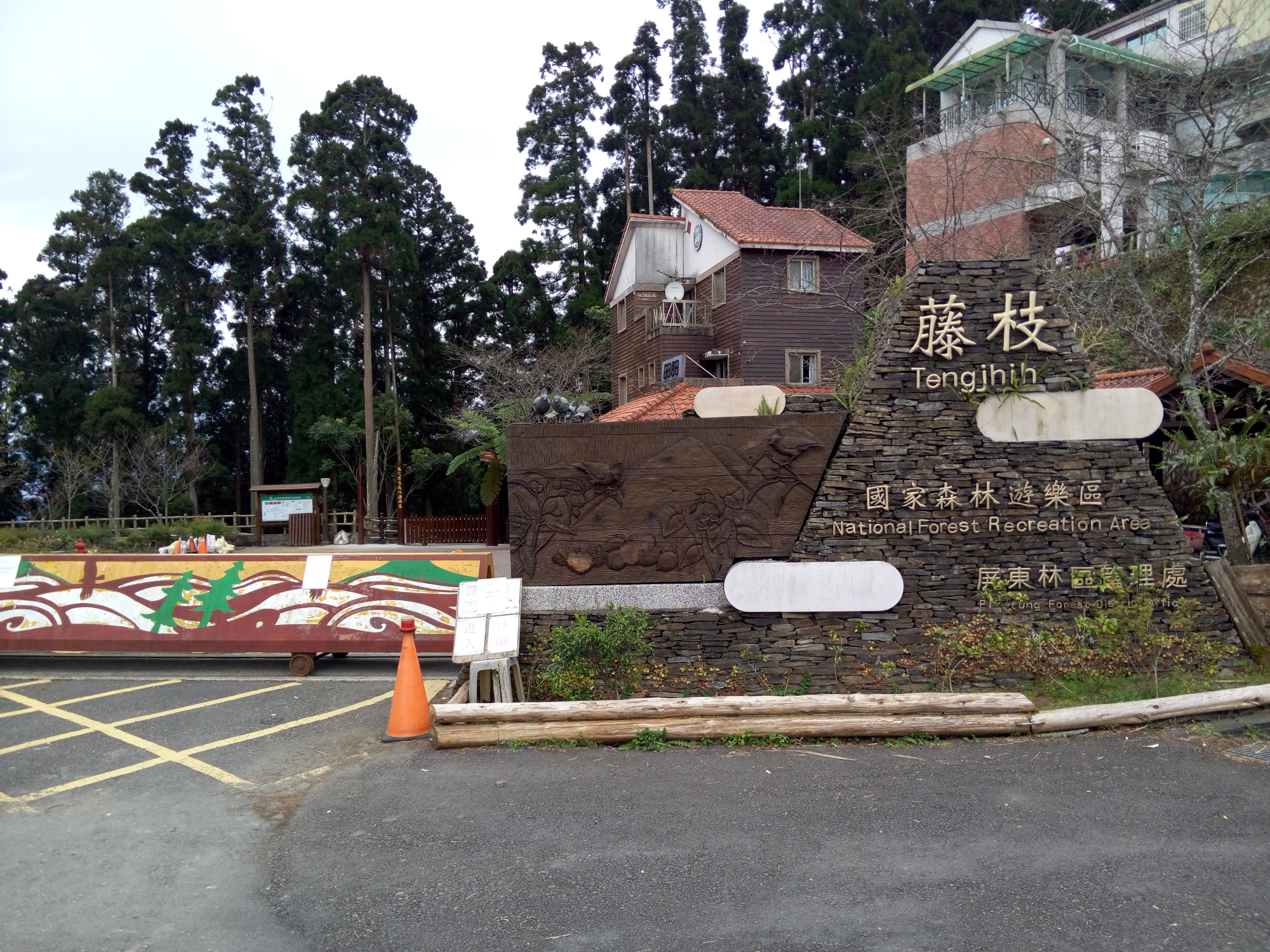

- Location within Kaohsiung
- Interactive map of Tengjhih National Forest Recreation Area

Geography
- Location: Taoyuan, Kaohsiung, Taiwan
- Coordinates: 23°4′4.5″N 120°45′16.2″E
- Elevation: 500–1,804 m (1,640–5,919 ft)
- Area: 770 ha (1,900 acres)

The Tengjhih National Forest Recreation Area (traditional Chinese: 藤枝國家森林遊樂區; simplified Chinese: 藤枝国家森林游乐区; pinyin: Téngzhī Guójiā Sēnlín Yóulè Qū) is located in Baoshan Village, Taoyuan District, Kaohsiung, Taiwan.

== Administration ==
The forest recreation area is administered by the 70th, 71st and 72nd offices of the Forestry and Nature Conservation Agency.

== Geography ==
The forest spreads over an area of 770 hectares with height ranges from 500 to 1,804 meters. It has a mean temperature of 18-21°C. The forest consists of Chinese firs, maples, cherry trees, plum trees etc.

== Facilities ==
The forest is equipped with log cabins, watchtower, meteorology station and alarm. Various activities can also be done in the forest, such as jungle trekking, hiking, mount climbing, bird watching etc.
