= Yen Wen-chang =

Taiwanese politician (born 1947)

Yen Wen-chang (Chinese: 顏文章; pinyin: Yán Wénzhāng; born 1947) is a Taiwanese politician.

Yen was elected to the sixth Legislative Yuan as a member of the Democratic Progressive Party representing Kaohsiung County in December 2004. During his legislative tenure, Yen took an interest in the Kuomintang's assets, and the use of ractopamine in pork imported from the United States. Yen lost reelection in 2008, to Kuomintang candidate Chung Shao-ho.
