= Chung Shao-ho =

Taiwanese politician (born 1956)

Chung Shao-ho MLY
- 鍾紹和

Member of the Legislative Yuan
- In office 1 February 1999 – 31 January 2012
- Succeeded by: Chiu Yi-ying
- Constituency: Kaohsiung County; Kaohsiung County 1

Personal details
- Born: 11 January 1956 (age 70) Kaohsiung County, Taiwan
- Party: Kuomintang (before 1999, after 2007)
- Other political affiliations: People First Party (2000–2007)
- Education: Chinese Culture University; National Sun Yat-sen University
- Occupation: politician

Chung Shao-ho (Chinese: 鍾紹和; pinyin: Zhōng Shàohé; born 11 January 1956) is a Taiwanese politician who served in the Legislative Yuan from 1999 to 2012.

== Early life and education ==
Born in 1956, Chung attended Chinese Culture University and National Sun Yat-sen University (NSYSU).

== Political career ==
=== Electoral history ===
Chung served five consecutive terms in the legislature from 1999 to 2012, representing Kaohsiung County. From 2000 to 2007, Chung was a member of the People First Party. In 2001 he was named the PFP candidate for the Kaohsiung County magistracy. Chung then withdrew and retained his legislative seat in a reelection bid after allegations of vote-buying were heard by the Kaohsiung District Court. In 2005, Chung again declared his candidacy for the Kaohsiung magistracy, representing the People First Party. In the 2012 legislative elections, while running as a Kuomintang candidate, Chung was investigated for electoral fraud and indicted on charges of bribery.

=== Legislative actions and political stances ===
In 2000, Beijing applied for the 2008 Olympic Games, and, before confirmation of the bid, proposed that Taipei help plan the event, a move Chung supported. He was involved in two fights on the floor of the Legislative Yuan in November 2003. In his second legislative term, Chung led the People First Party caucus. He supported a referendum law that barred the consideration of Taiwanese sovereignty. The Referendum Act was passed in December 2003, and the first question put to referendum in March 2004 regarded the state of cross-strait relations.

He rejected a blanket ban on indoor public smoking discussed in November 2006, as he believed such a regulation would harm businesses. In March 2008, Chung was named a co-convenor of the Sanitation, Environment, Social Welfare and Labor Committee alongside Hsu Shao-ping. Chung supported amendments to the Labor Standards Act proposed in April, raising the mandatory retirement age to 65, but also said early retirement could still remain an option for some. Later that month, Chung threatened to sue Citizen Congress Watch for handing him a bad review. He opposed the Executive Yuan's amendment to the Local Government Act in December 2009, which sought to cut down on the number of elected officials in special municipalities. In October 2010, when China proposed military talks with Taiwan, Chung argued for moving Republic of China Armed Forces personnel away from Kinmen and Matsu as a show of goodwill. He was active in legislative discussions about agriculture. Chung supported an increased agricultural subsidy of NT$10,000, over an Executive Yuan-backed NT$316. Chung opposed economic limits on eligibility for the subsidy, and the Executive Yuan sought to determine that status based on income or real estate value. The agricultural pension amendment was passed eventually, and excluded the value of residential homes in granting subsidies worth NT$7,000.

2008 Kaohsiung 1 Legislative Yuan Electoral result
Order	Candidate	Party	Votes	Percentage	Elected
1	Chung Shao-ho	Kuomintang	72,309	53.55%	
2	Chiang Chia-sheng	Civil Party	1,025	0.76%	
3	Yen Wen-chang	Democratic Progressive Party	61,679	45.68%	
Eligible voters			222,141		
Votes			137,242		
Valid			135,013		
Invalid			2,229		
Turnout			61.78%		

2012 Kaohsiung 1 Legislative Yuan Electoral result
Order	Candidate	Party	Votes	Percentage	Elected
1	Chiu Yi-ying	Democratic Progressive Party	89,913	54.32%	
2	Chung Shao-he	Kuomintang	75,627	45.68%	
Eligible voters			223,797		
Votes			167,791		
Valid			165,540		
Invalid			2,251		
Turnout			74.97%		

== Personal life ==
His uncle David Chung has served as the People First Party's secretary general and was the Vice President of the Legislative Yuan from 2005 to 2008.
