= Cishan Wude Hall =

Former martial arts hall in Qishan, Kaohsiung, Taiwan

- 旗山武德殿
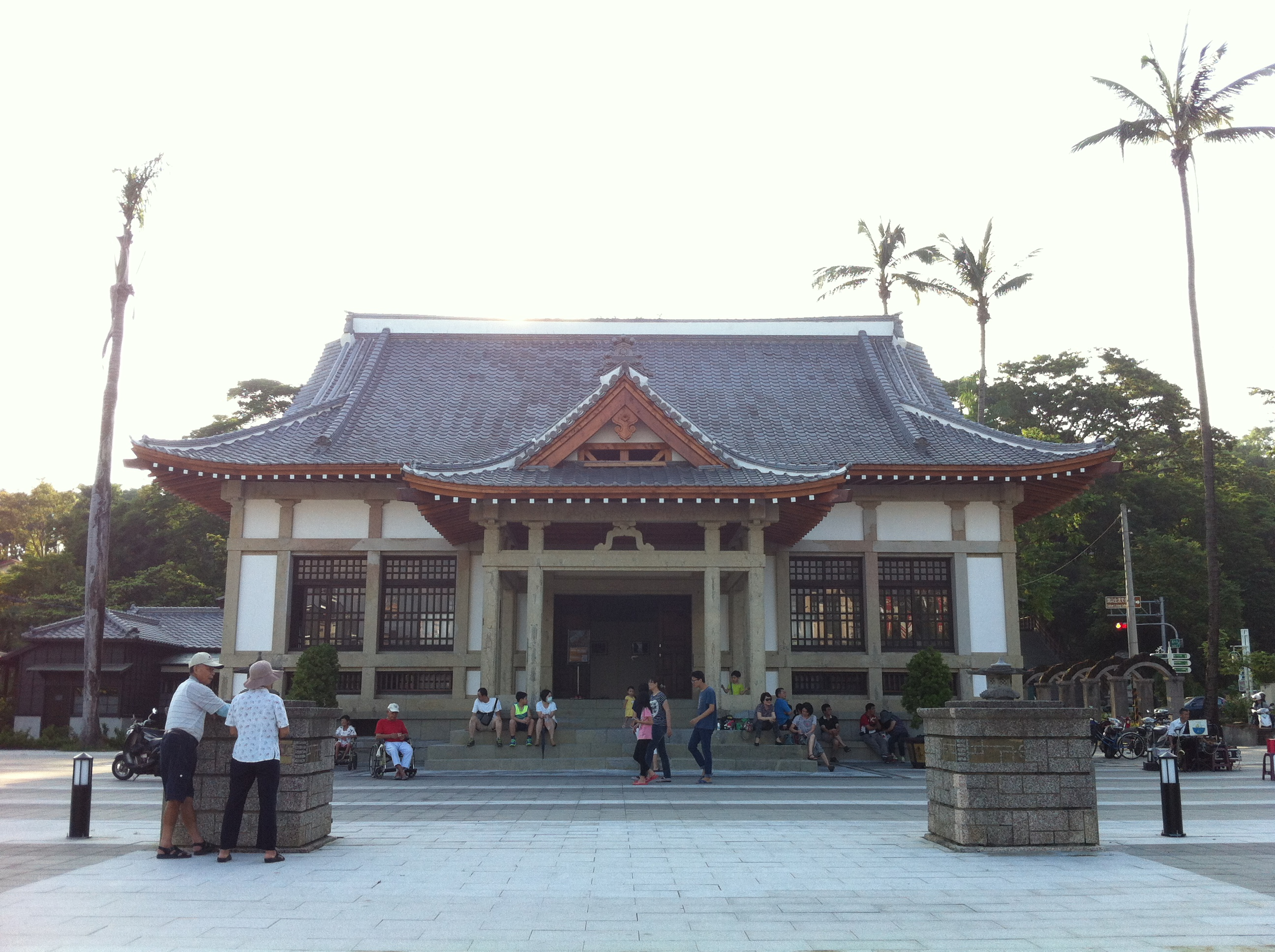
- Interactive map of the Cishan Wude Hall area

General information
- Type: former martial arts hall
- Location: Qishan, Kaohsiung, Taiwan
- Coordinates: 22°53′16.8″N 120°28′48.6″E
- Completed: 1934

The Cishan Wude Hall (Chinese: 旗山武德殿; Hanyu Pinyin: Qíshān Wǔdé Diàn; Tongyong Pinyin: Císhan Wǔdé Diàn) is a former martial arts training center in Qishan District, Kaohsiung, Taiwan. It was built in 1934 after being proposed by the Japanese "in the spirit of Bushido". The hall was constructed in a traditional Japanese-style temple with strong Tang dynasty-style temples style.

== See also ==
- List of tourist attractions in Taiwan
