= Martin College =

- Type: Private
- Established: 1976
- Affiliations: Australian Catholic University, Central Queensland University, Charles Sturt University, Griffith University, Queensland University of Technology, Raffles College of Design and Commerce
- Location: Sydney Brisbane Melbourne, VICNSW QLD, Australia
- Campus: Urban
- Website: www.martin.edu.au

Martin College is an Australian vocational education and training (VET) provider with campuses in Brisbane, Melbourne and central Sydney. The college is also part of Study Group International, a worldwide specialist education company.

Martin College provides accredited, nationally recognised diploma and certificate courses in the areas of business and management, marketing, information technology, travel and tourism, event management and graphic design.

== History ==
Martin College was established in 1976, when the Lorraine Martin Receptionist and Deportment Academy, founded by Lorraine Martin, commenced trading. By 1985 it was known as Lorraine Martin Commercial College Limited and operated under that title until November 1995 when it was purchased by Education and Training Australia Pty Limited.

Education and Training Australia Pty Limited became the Registered Training Organisation, which traded as Lorraine Martin College Pty Limited. Martin continued as a director and consultant to the company until her retirement in April 1997.

In October 1997, Education and Training Australia Pty Limited changed its name to Study Group Australia Pty Limited, and became the Registered Training Provider as of 1 January 1998. The vocational education and training division continued to operate as Lorraine Martin College Pty Limited. All marketing and advertising up to that time, both onshore and offshore, featured the use of the founder's name: Lorraine Martin.

In August 1998, Lorraine Martin College Pty Limited was renamed Martin College Pty Limited, and became commonly known as Martin College.

Martin College was rebranded in 2014 to Martin.

== NTIS, NARA and CRICOS registrations ==
Martin offers courses based on the Australian Government's Nationally Endorsed Training packages as listed at www.training.gov.au - previously the National Training Information Service (NTIS), the database on vocational education and training in Australia. www.training.gov.au is the official national register of information on Training Packages, Qualifications, Courses, Units of Competency and Registered Training Organisations (RTOs).

As a multi-state organisation, Martin operates under the NARA, the National Audit and Registration Agency, which provides audit and registration services for Registered Training Organisations (RTOs) that operate in more than one Australian State or Territory. These are known as multi-jurisdictional RTOs.

Martin is able to accept non-Australian students as it is registered on the Commonwealth Register of Institutions and Courses for Overseas Students (CRICOS).

== Sources ==
- Lorraine Martin’s Australian Honour
