= Hwa Hsia University of Technology =

University in New Taipei, Taiwan

- 華夏科技大學
- Type: Private University of Technology
- Active: Founded 1966 (as Hwa Hsia School of Agricultural Technology); Reorganized 2004 (as Hwa Hsia Institute of Technology); Reorganized 2014 (as Hwa Hsia University of Technology)–2023
- President: 陳富都(Pe̍h-ōe-jī: Tân Hù-to͘)
- Location: Zhonghe, New Taipei, Taiwan
- Website: http://www.hwh.edu.tw

Hwa Hsia University of Technology
- Traditional Chinese: 華夏科技大學
Transcriptions
Standard Mandarin
- Hanyu Pinyin: Huáxià kējìdàxué
Southern Min
- Hokkien POJ: Hôa-hā Kho-ki Tāi-ha̍k

Hwa Hsia University of Technology (HHUT; Chinese: 華夏科技大學; Pe̍h-ōe-jī: Hôa-hā Kho-ki Tāi-ha̍k) was a private technical university located in Zhonghe District, New Taipei, Taiwan. The name makes reference to the Huaxia ethno-cultural group. On August 1, 2023, Hwa Hsia University of Technology (HHUT) was merged into the National Taiwan University of Science and Technology (NTUST). Following the merger, NTUST established the NTUST Hwa Hsia Campus in Zhonghe District, New Taipei City, marking the first merger between a public and a private university in Taiwan.

== History ==
The university was founded in 1966 as Hwa Hsia School of Agricultural Technology (simplified Chinese: 华夏农业专科学校; traditional Chinese: 華夏農業專科學校; pinyin: Huáxià Nóngyè Zhuānkē Xuéxiào; Pe̍h-ōe-jī: Hôa-hā Lông-gia̍p Choan-kho Ha̍k-hāu) by Dr. Frank T. Y. Chao (趙聚鈺; Pe̍h-ōe-jī: Tiō Chū-gio̍k).

== Departments ==
HHUT had nine constituent academic departments:

- Department of Electronic Engineering
- Department of Electrical Engineering
- Department of Mechanical Engineering
- Department of Chemical Engineering
- Department of Computer Science and Information Engineering
- Department of Information Management
- Department of Assets and Property Management (graduate institute included)
- Department of Business Administration
- Department of Architecture Department
- Department of Digital Media Design
- Department of Interior Design
- Department of Applied Cosmetology
- Department of Biochemical Engineering
- Department of Construction Management

== See also ==
- List of universities in Taiwan
