= Cishan District =

District in Kaohsiung, Taiwan

Coordinates: 22.867951°N 120.473907°E

Cishan 旗山區 Kizan, Qishan, Chishan
- District
- Cishan District
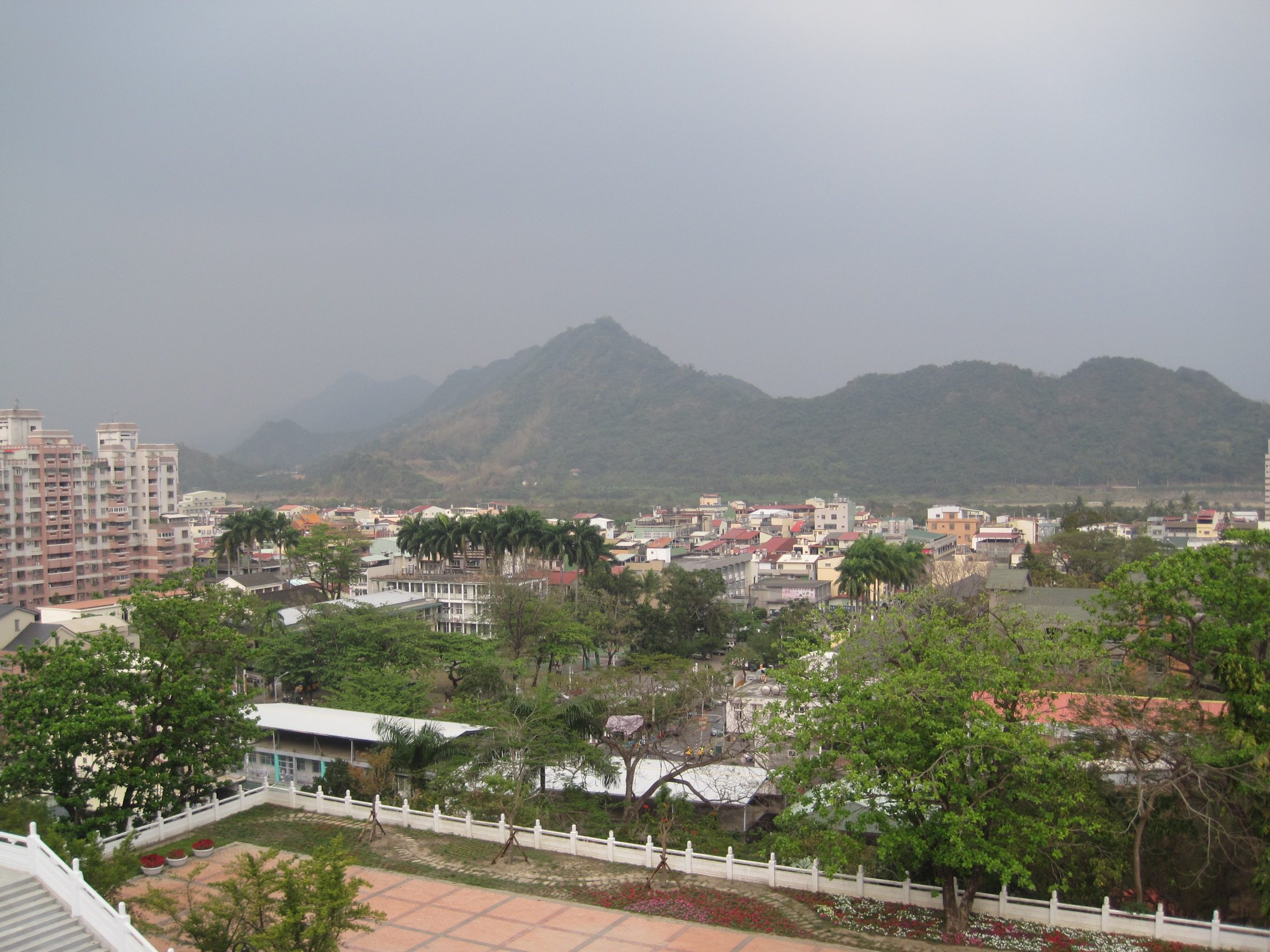

- 高雄市旗山區公所; CISHAN DISTRICT OFFICE KAOHSIUNG CITY

- Cishan District in Kaohsiung City
- Country: Taiwan
- Region: Southern Taiwan

Area
  - Total: 94.6122 km^{2} (36.5300 sq mi)
- Elevation: 87 m (285 ft)

Population (October 2023)
  - Total: 34,372
  - Rank: 19
  - Density: 368/km^{2} (950/sq mi)
- Postal code: 842
- Website: cishan88.kcg.gov.tw/en/ (in English)

Cishan District (also spelled Qishan; Chinese: 旗山區; Hanyu Pinyin: Qíshān Qū; Tongyong Pinyin: Císhan Cyu; Wade–Giles: Ch'i^{2}-shan^{1} Ch'ü^{1}) is a suburban district in northeastern Kaohsiung, Taiwan. It has an area of 94.61 square kilometers, or 36.53 square miles. The population of Cishan is 34,372 as of October 2023. It is the 19th most populous district in Kaohsiung.

== History ==
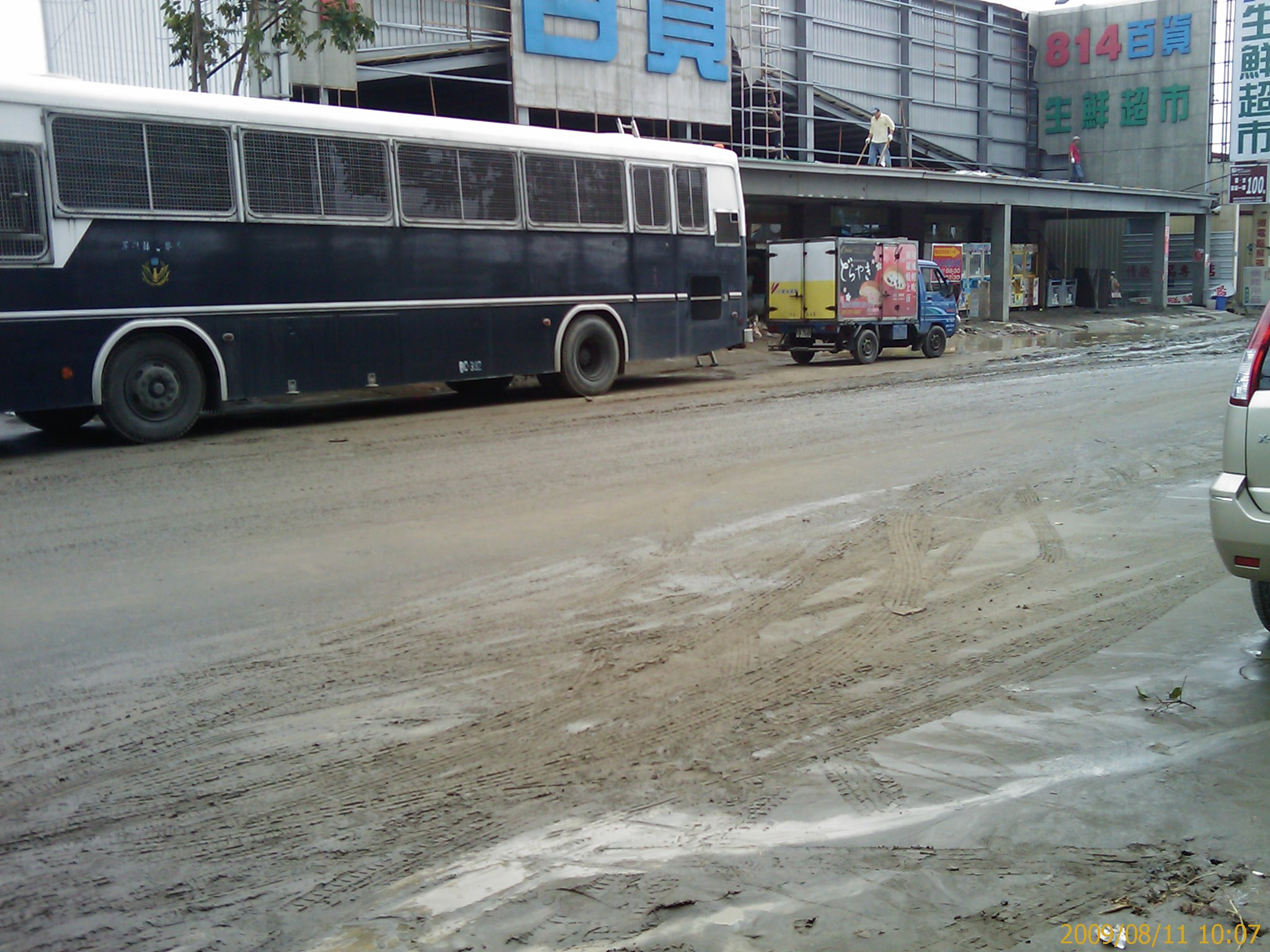
The aftermath of Typhoon Morakot in Cishan Township in 2009.

After the handover of Taiwan from Japan to the Republic of China in 1945, Cishan was organized as an urban township of Kaohsiung County. On 25 December 2010, Kaohsiung County was merged with Kaohsiung City and Cishan was upgraded to a district of the city.

In 2009, then Cishan Township was affected by Typhoon Morakot.

== Geography ==
- Area: 94.61 square kilometres (36.53 sq mi)
- Population: 34,372 (October 2023)

== Administrative divisions ==
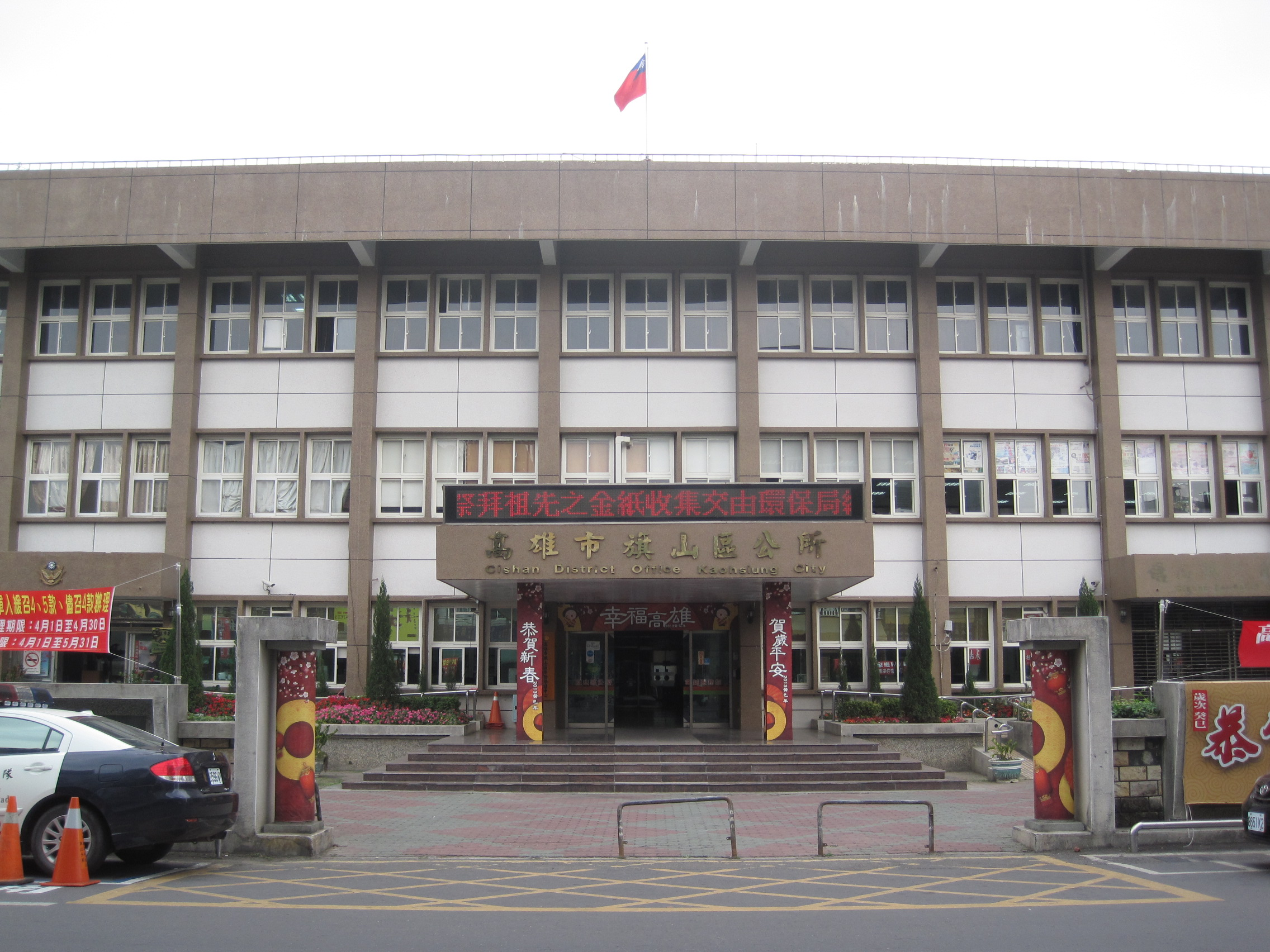
Cishan District Office

Cishan District administrative divisions

The district comprises 21 villages:

- 1 Dalin
- 2 Zhongzheng
- 3 Yuanfu
- 4 Tungping
- 5 Yonghe
- 6 Ruiji
- 7 Zhufeng
- 8 Meizhou
- 9 Taiping
- 10 Dade
- 11 Sanxie
- 12 Tungchang
- 13 Guangfu
- 14 Kunzhou
- 15 Shangzhou
- 16 Dashan
- 17 Zhongzhou
- 18 Nanzhou
- 19 Xinguang
- 20 Nansheng
- 21 Zhongliao

== Education ==
- Fortune Institute of Technology

== Tourist attractions ==
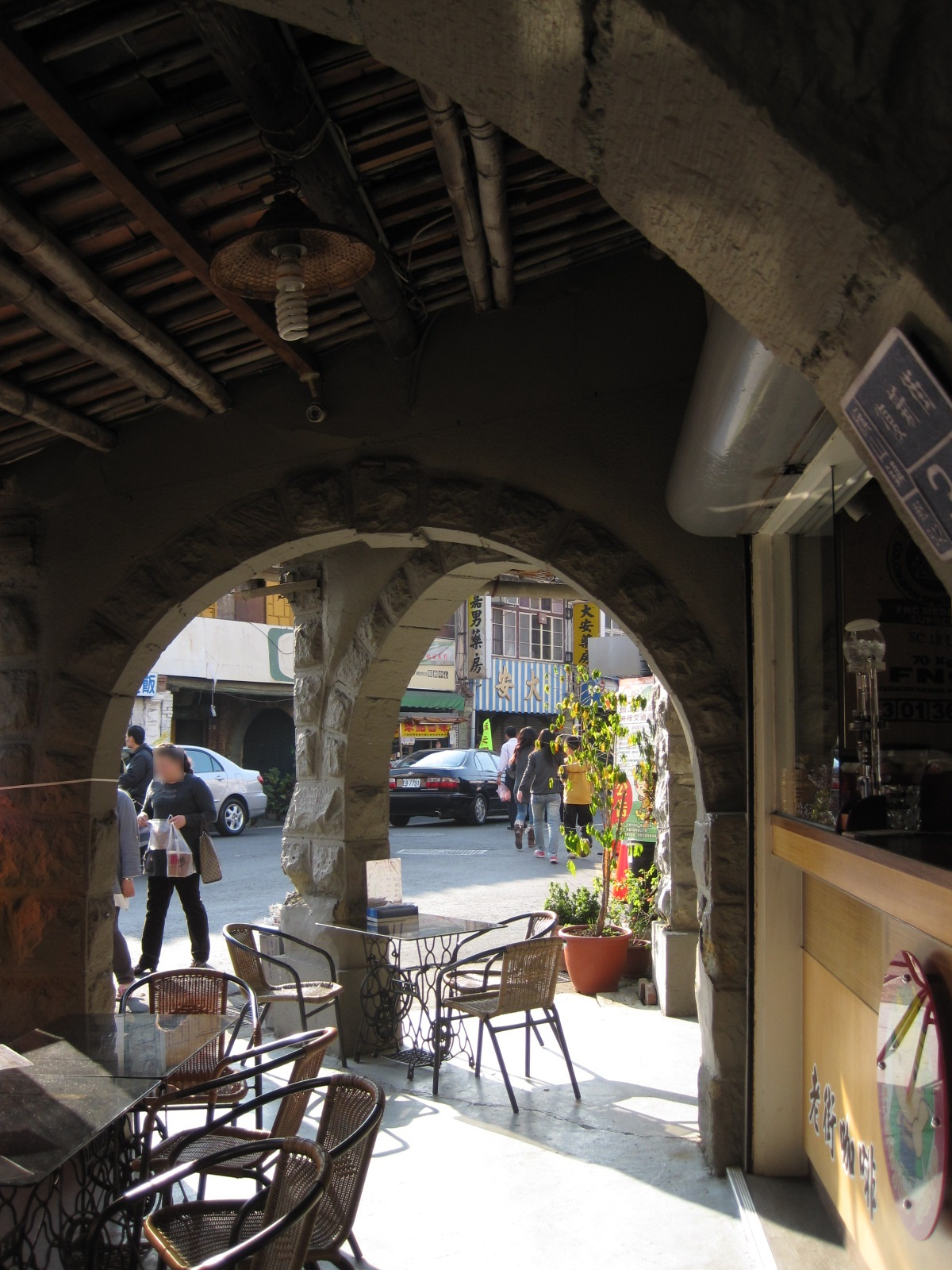
Cishan Old Street

- Cishan Wude Hall
- Qishan Living Cultural Park
- Qishan Station
- Cishan Tianhou Temple (旗山天后宮)
- Cishan Old Street
- Jhongshan Park
- Mount Ciwei
- Mount Jhongliao Leisure and Agriculture Area
- Stone Arches Corridor
- Wulong Fongsan Temple (五龍山鳳山寺)

== Transportation ==
A railroad was operated by Taiwan Sugar Company for carrying sugarcanes, cargo, and passenger service from 1910 to 1978 . Trains took more than 100 minutes from Cishan to Jiuqutang railway station, where passengers and goods could be transferred to trains operated by Taiwan Railway. The track was removed in 1982 and the station building at Cishan was preserved as a museum.

Several major highways pass Cishan:

- Provincial Highway 3: Neimen-Cishan-Ligang (Pingtung County)
- Provincial Highway 22: Nanzhi-Yanchao-Cisan-Gaoshu (Pingtung County)
- Provincial Highway 29: Jiaxian-Shanlin-Cishan-Dashu
- National Freeway 10 links Cishan and Zuoying. It connects with National Freeway 3 and National Freeway 1 at Yanchao Junction and Dinjing Junction (Zuoying) respectively

Bus transportation was provided by Kaohsiung Transportation and EDA Bus. Cishan Bus Station is the main transportation hub of Cishan.

== Notable natives ==
- Chen Chien-jen, Vice President of the Republic of China (Taiwan) (2016–2020)
- Lo Ching-lung, baseball player
- Lu Li'an, English professor and People's Republic of China politician
- Ovid Tzeng, Minister of Council for Cultural Affairs (2011–2012)
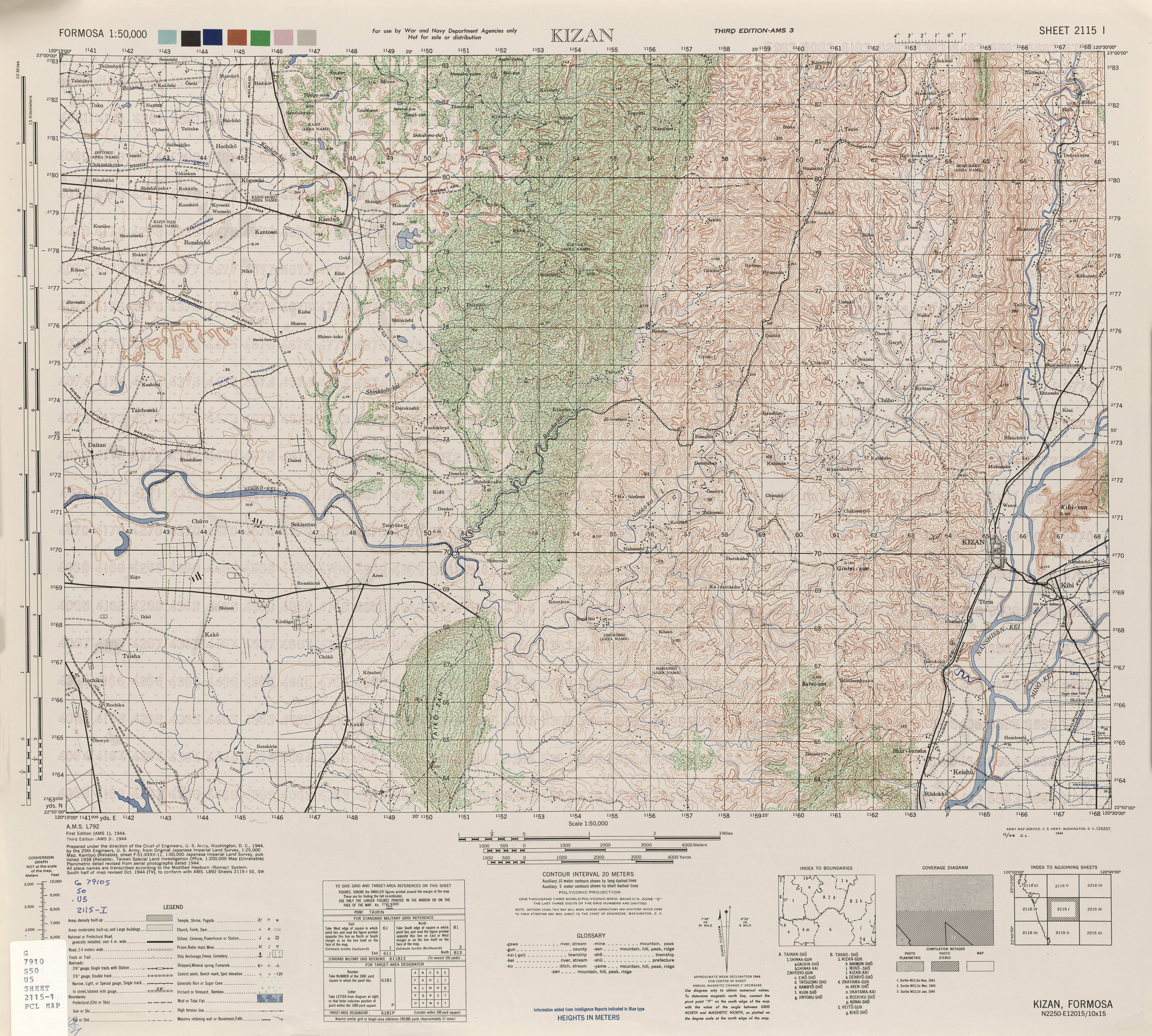
Map of Cishan (labeled as KIZAN) area (1944)

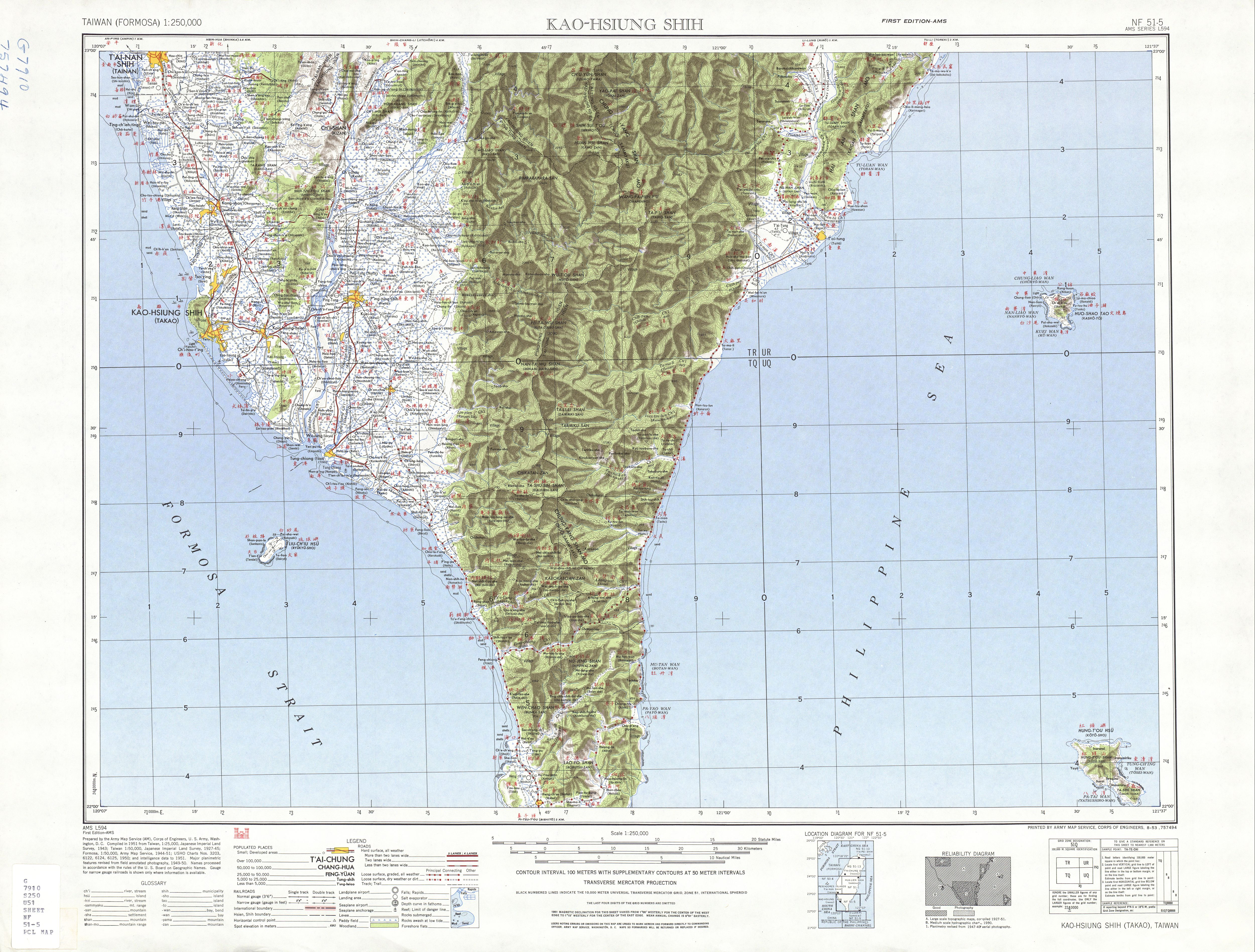
Map of the region including Cishan (labeled as CHʻI-SHAN (KIZAN) 旗山) (1951)
