= Taoyuan District, Kaohsiung =

Mountain indigenous district in Kaohsiung, Taiwan

Coordinates: 23.238822°N 120.834289°E

Taoyuan 桃源區
- Mountain Indigenous District
- Taoyuan District
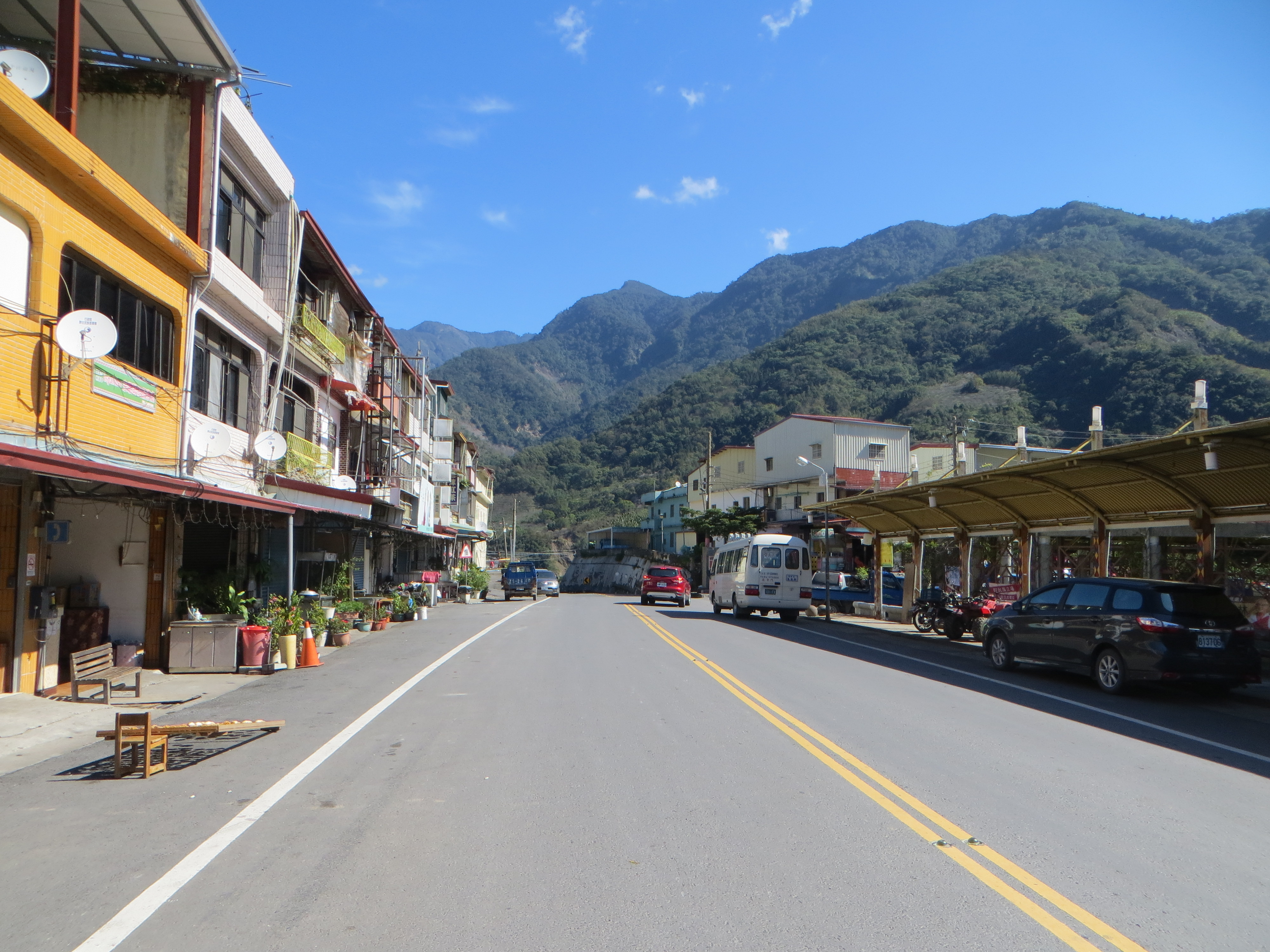

- Taoyuan District in Kaohsiung City
- Country: Taiwan
- Municipality: Kaohsiung City
- Boroughs: List: 8 villages

Government
  - Type: District government
  - District chief: Xie Ying-xiong (KMT)

Area
  - Total: 928.98 km^{2} (358.68 sq mi)

Population (October 2023)
  - Total: 4,249
- Website: tauyuan-en.kcg.gov.tw

Taoyuan District (Bunun: Ngani; Chinese: 桃源區; pinyin: Táoyuán Qū) is a mountain indigenous district of Kaohsiung City, Taiwan. It is the largest district in Kaohsiung City by area and the least densely populated district in Taiwan.

The population is mainly the indigenous Bunun people and Saaroa people.

== Name ==
The same Pinyin form, Taoyuan District, exists in two different districts in Taiwan: one is 桃源區 in Kaohsiung, the other is 桃園區 in Taoyuan City.

== Geography ==
It is the district that is most mountainous and most distant from the city center. The population density in Taoyuan District is one of the least in Taiwan, but the area of the district is the sixth largest. Both Yushan National Park and Maolin National Scenic Area are situated in this district. Taoyuan District is very mountainous with very little flat land. Laonong River passes through Taoyuan District and is an important water source for Kaohsiung. The climate of the Taoyuan district is a tropical monsoon climate.

== History ==
During the period of Japanese rule, Taoyuan was grouped with modern-day Namasia and Maolin districts and classified as "Aboriginal Areas" (蕃地), which was governed under Kizan District (旗山郡) of Takao Prefecture. After the war, the aboriginal area was renamed Yani Township (雅爾鄉, also spelled as 雅你).

On 1 July 1957, Yani Township was renamed Taoyuan Township.

In 2010, Taoyuan Township was elevated to Taoyuan District.

== Quick facts ==
- Area: 928.98 km^{2}.
- Population: 4,249 people (October 2023)
- Divisions: 8 urban villages and 39 neighborhoods
- Postal Code: 848
- Households: 1,383 (October 2023)

== Administrative divisions ==
Taoyuan District administrative divisions

== Economy ==
Agriculture produces of the district are vegetables, fruits, processed agricultural products, prunes, jelly fig products and flowers.

== Tourist attractions ==
- Tengjhih National Forest Recreation Area
- Xiangyang Mountain
- Yushan National Park

== Notable natives ==
- Tseng Shu-o, famous football player

== See also ==
- Kaohsiung
