= Kaohsiung County =

Former county of Taiwan

Coordinates: 23°01′10.5″N 120°39′59.1″E

Kaohsiung County 高雄縣
- County of the Republic of China
- 1945–2010
- Flag of Kaohsiung County Coat of arms

- Location of Kaohsiung County in Taiwan.
- Capital: Fongshan
- Area
  - December 2010: 2,792.67 km^{2} (1,078.26 sq mi)
- Population
  - December 2010: 1,243,410
- History
  - Established: 6 December 1945
  - Disestablished: 25 December 2010
- Political subdivisions: 1 County-administered city 3 Urban townships 20 Rural townships 3 Mountain indigenous townships
Preceded by	Succeeded by
Takao Prefecture	Kaohsiung
- Today part of: Part of Kaohsiung (Special municipality)

Kaohsiung County
- Traditional Chinese: 高雄縣
- Simplified Chinese: 高雄县
Transcriptions
Standard Mandarin
- Hanyu Pinyin: Gāoxióng Xiàn
- Wade–Giles: Kao¹-hsiung² Hsien⁴
- Tongyong Pinyin: Gaosyóng Siàn
Hakka
- Romanization: Kô-hiùng Yen
Yue: Cantonese
- Jyutping: gou1hung4 yun6
Southern Min
- Hokkien POJ: Ko-hiông Kōan

Kaohsiung County was a county in southern Taiwan between 1945 and 2010. The county seat was located in Fongshan City. The Taiwan-based Republic of China government administered the county as part of its Taiwan Province. In 2010, the county was merged into Kaohsiung City. This also resulted in its formal exit from Taiwan Province, since Kaohsiung City was by that time governed as a special municipality separate from the province.

== History ==
Kaohsiung County was established on 6 December 1945 on the territory of Takao Prefecture (高雄州) shortly after the end of World War II. In the early years, Kaohsiung County consists of most territory of Takao Prefecture except the territory near cities of Takao (Kaohsiung) and Heitō (Pingtung). The county is divided into districts (區), which come from reformed Japanese districts (郡). The districts are divided into townships.

Districts in Takao Prefecture		Districts in Kaohsiung County		Notes
Hōzan	鳳山郡	Feng-shan	鳳山區	Defunct in 1947, townships controlled by the County directly
Okayama	岡山郡	Kang-shan	岡山區	
Kizan	旗山郡	Ch'i-shan	旗山區	
Heitō	屏東郡	P'ing-tung	屏東區	
Chōshū	潮州郡	Ch'ao-chou	潮州區	
Tōkō	東港郡	Tung-kang	東港區	
Kōshun	恒春郡	Heng-ch'un	恆春區	
		Hsiung-feng	雄峰區	Established in 1949, covers the northern mountain indigenous townships
		Kao-feng	高峰區	Established in 1949, covers the southern mountain indigenous townships

On 16 August 1950, another division reform was implemented. The southern part of the county was separated and established Pingtung County. The remaining Kaohsiung County has territory equivalent to the Hōzan (Fengshan), Okayama (Kangshan), and Kizan (Chishan) in the Japanese era. In addition, districts in the remaining part of Kaohsiung County was defunct. All townships were directly controlled by the County Government. On 25 December 2010, the county merged with Kaohsiung City to form a larger single special municipality.

== Administration ==
The subdivisions of the County remains mostly stable between 1950 and 2010. However, some changed has also been made.

- 1 July 1957, Maya Township (瑪雅鄉) was renamed Sanmin Township (三民鄉), Yani Township (雅爾鄉) was renamed Taoyuan Township (桃源鄉), Tona Township (多納鄉) was renamed Maolin Township (茂林鄉).
- 1 July 1972, Fengshan (鳳山鎮) reformed from an urban township to a county-administered city for its population.
- 1 July 1979, Siaogang Township (小港鄉) merged into Kaohsiung City and reformed from a rural township to a district called Siaogang District.
- 1 January 2008, Sanmin Township was renamed Namasia Township (那瑪夏鄉).

On 25 December 2010, the county was merged with Kaohsiung City, all cities and townships became districts. On the eve of merging with Kaohsiung City, the county consists of the following administrative divisions

Type	Name	Chinese	Taiwanese	Hakka	Region
City	Fongshan (Fengshan)	鳳山市	Hōng-soaⁿ	Fung-sân	Fongshan
Urban townships	Gangshan	岡山鎮	Kong-san	Kông-sân	Gangshan
Urban townships	Cishan (Qishan)	旗山鎮	Kî-san	Khì-sân	Cishan
Urban townships	Meinong	美濃鎮	Bi-long	Mî-nùng	Cishan
Rural townships	Linyuan	林園鄉	Lîm-hn̂g	Lìm-yèn	Fongshan
Rural townships	Daliao	大寮鄉	Toā-liâu	Thai-liàu	Fongshan
Rural townships	Dashu	大樹鄉	Toā-chhiū	Thai-su	Fongshan
Rural townships	Dashe	大社鄉	Toā-siā	Thai-sa	Fongshan
Rural townships	Renwu	仁武鄉	Jîn-bú	Yìn-vú	Fongshan
Rural townships	Niaosong	鳥松鄉	Chiáu-chhêng	Tiâu-tshiùng	Fongshan
Rural townships	Ciaotou (Qiaotou)	橋頭鄉	Kiô-thâu	Khiâu-thèu	Gangshan
Rural townships	Yanchao	燕巢鄉	Iàn-châu	Yèn-tshâu	Gangshan
Rural townships	Tianliao	田寮鄉	Chhân-liâu	Thièn-liàu	Gangshan
Rural townships	Alian	阿蓮鄉	A-lian	Â-lièn	Gangshan
Rural townships	Lujhu (Luzhu)	路竹鄉	Lō͘-tek	Lu-tsuk	Gangshan
Rural townships	Hunei	湖內鄉	Ô͘-lāi	Fù-nui	Gangshan
Rural townships	Cieding (Qieding)	茄萣鄉	Ka-tiāⁿ	Kâ-tin	Gangshan
Rural townships	Yong-an (Yong'an)	永安鄉	Éng-an	Yún-ôn	Gangshan
Rural townships	Mituo	彌陀鄉	Mî-tô	Mì-thò	Gangshan
Rural townships	Zihguan (Ziguan)	梓官鄉	Chú-koaⁿ	Tsṳ́-kôn	Gangshan
Rural townships	Liouguei (Liugui)	六龜鄉	La̍k-ku	Liuk-kuî	Cishan
Rural townships	Jiasian (Jiaxian)	甲仙鄉	Kah-sian	Kap-siên	Cishan
Rural townships	Shanlin	杉林鄉	Sam-nâ	Tsham-lìm	Cishan
Rural townships	Neimen	內門鄉	Lāi-mn̂g	Nui-mùn	Cishan
Mountain indigenous townships	Maolin	茂林鄉	Bō͘-lîm	Meu-lìm	Cishan
Mountain indigenous townships	Tauyuan (Taoyuan)	桃源鄉	Thô-goân	Thò-ngièn	Cishan
Mountain indigenous townships	Namasia (Namaxia)	那瑪夏鄉	Namasia	Namasia	Cishan

== See also ==
- Kaohsiung
- List of county magistrates of Kaohsiung
