= Neimen District =

District in Kaohsiung, Taiwan

Coordinates: 22.951754°N 120.468467°E

Neimen 內門區
- District
- Neimen District
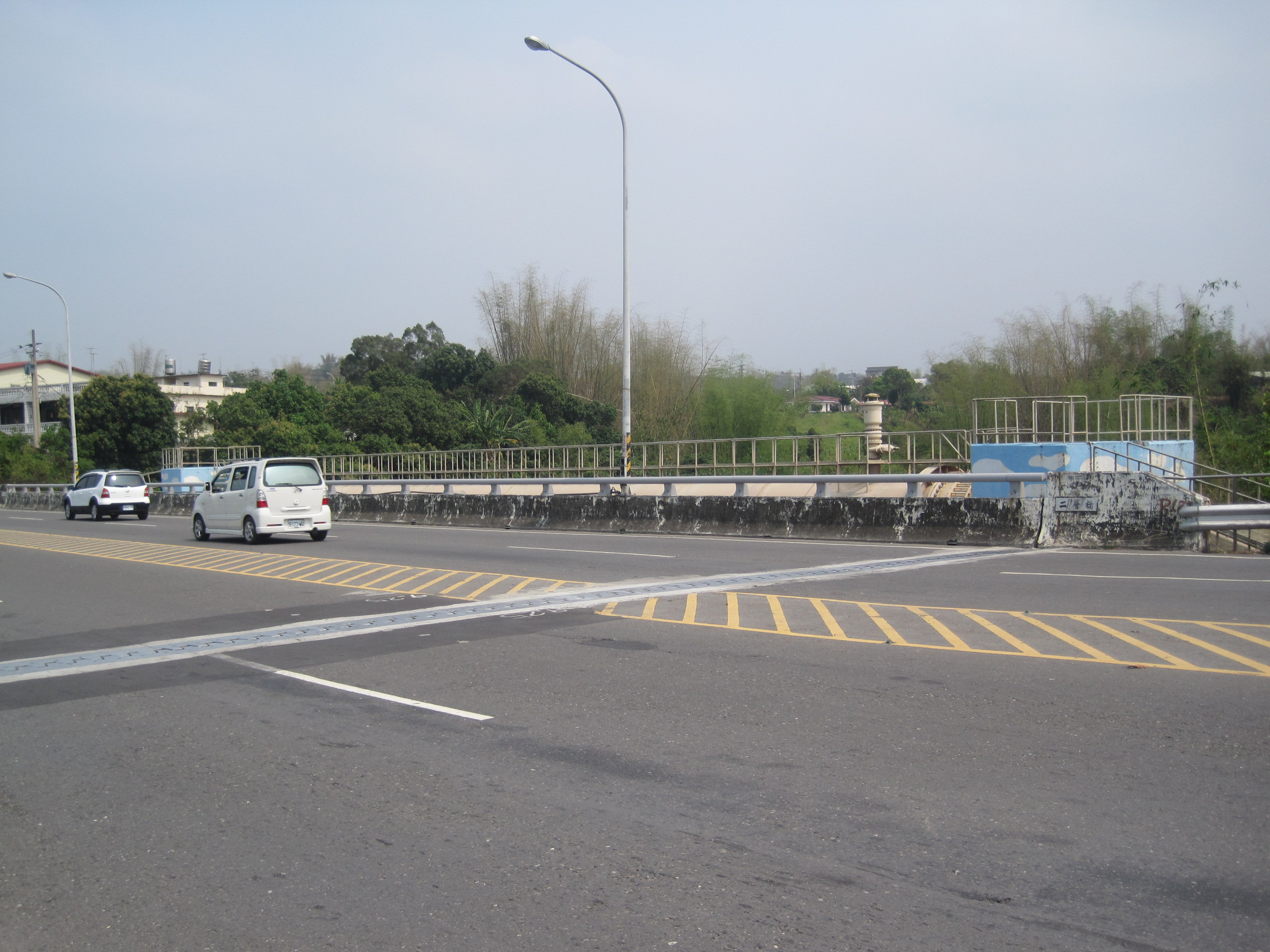
- Neimen District

- Neimen District in Kaohsiung City
- Country: Taiwan
- Region: Southern Taiwan

Population (October 2023)
  - Total: 13,228
- Website: neimen.kcg.gov.tw/en/

Neimen District (Chinese: 內門區; pinyin: Nèimén Qū) is a rural district of Kaohsiung in southern Taiwan. Neimen is located in the mountainous area with very little flat land. Qishan River passes through the Neimen district. The whole district is under water reserve protection. The climate of Neimen belongs to the tropical monsoon climate.

== History ==
After the handover of Taiwan from Japan to the Republic of China in 1945, Neimen was organized as a rural township of Kaohsiung County. On 25 December 2010, Kaohsiung County was merged with Kaohsiung City and Neimen was upgraded to a district of the city.

== Quick facts ==
- Area: 95.6224 km^{2}.
- Population: 13,228 people (October 2023)
- Divisions: 18 urban villages 196 Neighborhoods
- Postal Code: 845
- Households: 5,101 (October 2023)

== Administrative divisions ==
The district consists of Gouping, Jinzhu, Yongfu, Yongji, Yongxing, Shikeng, Neimen, Neili, Guanting, Zhongpu, Neitung, Neinan, Tungpu, Sanping, Muzha, Neixing, Ruishan and Guangxing Village.

== Economy ==
The major occupation in the district is farming. However, the district is also famous for its roadside banquet culture.

== Education ==
- Shih Chien University

== Tourist attractions ==
- 308 Highland
- Neimen Zhi-jhu Temple (內門紫竹寺)
- Seven Star Towers
- Tsui-Wen School
- Volunteer Soldier Temple
- Neimen Zhiyun Temple (內門紫雲宮)
- Neimen Shunxian Temple (順賢宮)

== See also ==
- Kaohsiung
