= Local elections in Taiwan =

Type of election in Taiwan

Local elections in Taiwan, also known as Nine-in-One Elections since 2014, are held to elect local officials and councilors in Taiwan. The election is typically held in the middle of a presidential term.

== Types ==
Elections are held to elect:

Executive government	Legislature
Mayors of special municipalities	Councillors in municipal councils
Magistrates of counties and mayors of cities	Councillors in county and city councils
Mayors of townships and cities	Representatives in township/city councils
Chief administrators of mountain indigenous districts	Representatives in mountain indigenous district councils
Village chiefs	—N/a

Since 2014, local elections have been unified to a single vote, typically in November, held once every four years. Mayors, magistrates, and chiefs are elected using first-past-the-post voting. Councillors and council representatives are elected using single non-transferable vote.

== List of local elections ==
Notes: Green refers to all eligible positions are up for election. Yellow refers to only some of the positions are up for election.

=== 1945–present ===
Year	Date	Province	Special municipality		County/City		Township/City		Village
Year	Date	Councillor	Mayor	Councillor	Magistrate/Mayor	Councillor	Mayor	Council Rep.	Chief
2022	18 December	Streamlined			1 (Chiayi)				
2022	26 November	Streamlined	6	355	15	533	204	2,139	7,748
2018	24 November	Streamlined	6	380	16	532	204	2,148	7,744
2014	29 November	Streamlined	6	372	16	532	204	2,146	7,851
2010	27 November	Streamlined	5	314					3,757 (Municipalities)
2010	12 June	Streamlined						2,322	4,074
2009	5 December	Streamlined			17	592	211		
2006	30 December	Streamlined							449 (Taipei)
2006	9 December	Streamlined	2	96					
2006	10 June	Streamlined						3,718	7,375
2005	3 December	Streamlined			23	901	319		
2003	4 January	Streamlined							449 (Taipei)
2002	7 December	Streamlined	2	96					
2002	8 June	Streamlined						3,717	7,360
2002	26 January	Streamlined				897	319		
2001	1 December	Streamlined			23				
1998	5 December	Streamlined	2	96					
1998	13 June	Streamlined						3,726	7,752
1998	24 January	Streamlined				891	319		
1997	29 November	Streamlined			23				
1994	3 December	75	2	96					
1994	16 July							3,909	6,663
1994	18 June								901 (Kaohsiung, Taipei)
1994	29 January					884	319		
1993	27 November				23				
1990	16 June							3,865	7,324
1990	20 January					842	319		
1989	2 December	77		94	21				
1986	14 June							3,754	6,692
1986	6 June								629 (Taipei)
1986	1 February					837	319		
1986	18 January							73 (Fuchien)	59 (Fuchien)
1985	16 November	77		93	21				
1982	12 June							3,700	6,624
1982	16 January					799	322	74 (Fuchien)	60 (Fuchien)
1981	14 November	77		93	19				
1981	31 May								629 (Taipei)
1978	17 June							3,793	6,427
1977	December							28 (Lienchiang)	23 (Lienchiang)
1977	19 November	77		51	20	857	313		
1975	1 June 1975– 20 June 1976								615 (Taipei)
1975	4 May							43 (Kinmen)	35 (Kinmen)
1973	1 December			49					
1973	6 October							3,757	6,482
1973	17 March					850	313		
1972	23 December	73			20				
1972	14 June 1972– 17 June 1973								606 (Taipei)
1971	25 April							43 (Kinmen)	35 (Kinmen)
1969	15 November			48					
1969	20 April–25 May								5,105
1968	5 May– 7 September 1969							4,709	
1968	21 April	71				847			
1968	21 January– 22 September				20		313		
1968	9 June 1968– 20 December 1970								574 (Taipei)
1965	18 April 1965– 17 March 1968								5,743
1964	10 May– 5 September 1965							4,776	
1964	26 April				21				
1964	26 January 1964– 25 July 1965						7		
1964	26 January					907	312		
1963	28 April	74							
1961	23 April– 6 September 1964							5,260	6,548
1961	15 January					929			
1960	24 April	73			21				
1959	6 December 1965– 15 May 1960						313		
1958	20 April 1958– 12 June 1960								6,608
1958	20 April–21 December							6,834	
1958	19 January					1,025			
1957	21 April	66			21				
1955	18 December 1955– 24 November 1957						360		
1955	17 April 1955– 24 March 1957								6,571
1955	17 April–21 December							6,397	
1954	19 December– 16 January 1955					928			
1954	18 July				2 (Miaoli, Taitung)				
1954	2 May				19				
1954	18 April–2 May	57							
1952	28 December 1952– 8 February 1953					860			
1952	21 December 1952– 20 December 1954						360	5,695	
1952	2 March 1952– 21 November 1954								6,517
1951	18 November	55 (Indirect election)							
1950	24 September 1950– 28 January 1951					814			
1950	29 October 1950– 2 March 1952						360		
1950	15 October 1950– 29 July 1951				21				
1950	10 September– 10 December 1951							9,778	
1950	3 September– 23 November 1952								6,464
1948	24 March–18 April							8,113	
1948	15 March–5 April								6,289
1946	15 April	30 (Indirect election)							
1946	15 March					523			
1946	22 February–10 March							7,771	
1946	16 February–5 March								6,304

The only election for the Governor of Taiwan Province was held on 3 December 1994.

=== Pre-1945 ===
- 1940 Taiwanese prefectural elections
- 1939 Taiwanese local elections
- 1936 Taiwanese prefectural elections
- 1935 Taiwanese local elections

== See also ==
- Elections in Taiwan
