= 1964 Taiwanese local elections =

← 1960	26 April 1964	1968 →

All 21 mayors/magistrates of cities, counties
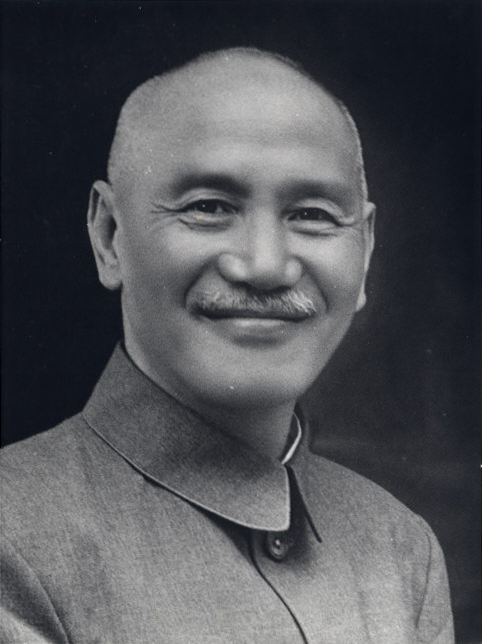

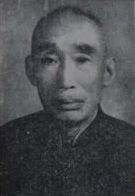

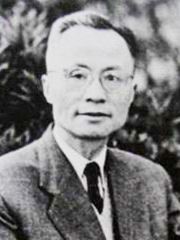
	Majority party	Minority party
Leader	Chiang Kai-shek	Hsiang Kou-fu and others
Party	Kuomintang	Democratic Socialist
Mayors/ Magistrates	17	1
Change	▼2	Steady
	Third party	Fourth party
Leader	Li Huang	None
Party	Youth	Independent
Mayors/ Magistrates	1	2
Change	▲1	▲1
- Kuomintang; China Democratic Socialist Party; Young China Party; Independents; Not up for election (Yangmingshan, Fuchien)

Local elections were held in Taiwan on 26 April 1964, the fifth nation-wide elections in post-war Taiwan, electing all 21 mayors of cities and magistrates of counties with a four-year tenure. Fuchien Province, then under military administration, was not up for election.

This is the first local election since the leading liberal figures were detained after Lei Chen and others of the Free China Journal attempted to form an opposition party. The ruling Kuomintang (or nationalist, KMT) suffered minor defeat, losing two magisterial or mayoral seat while keeping 17. Taipei and Tainan were won by Tangwai candidates, while China Democratic Socialist Party (CDSP) and Young China Party (YCP) each secured one administrative division.

== Summary ==
The list below shows the statistics of party membership of candidates standing in the election. Coloured box refers to the party membership of elected mayor or magistrate.

	KMT	CDSP	Youth	Ind
Taipei County	1			1
Taipei City	1			4
Keelung City	1	1		
Yilan County	?	?	?	?
Taoyuan County	1			3
Hsinchu County	1			
Miaoli County	1			1
Taichung County	2			
Taichung City	1			2
Changhua County	2			
Nantou County	1			
Yunlin County	1			
Chiayi County	2			1
Tainan County	2			
Tainan City	1	1		2
Kaohsiung County	1			1
Kaohsiung City	1	1		2
Pingtung County	1		1	
Hualien County	1			
Taitung County	1		1	
Penghu County	1			

Re-elected incumbents are: Lin Fan-wang (Keelung City), Peng Jui-lu (Hsinchu County), Lin Wei-kung (Miaoli County), Lu Shih-ming (Changhua County), Chen Chi-chuan (Kaohsiung City).

== Detailed results ==
=== Taipei ===
Magistrate of Taipei
Candidate	Party	Votes	%
蘇清波	Kuomintang	111,360	56.74
李庭昌	Independent	84,903	43.26
Total		196,263	100.00
Valid votes		196,263	98.22
Invalid/blank votes		3,561	1.78
Total votes		199,824	100.00
Registered voters/turnout		511,787	39.04

Kuomintang was said to have been warned by the United States against manipulating the election, after the Korean April Revolution in 1960 which was sparked by rigged presidential election. Considering the support of Tangwai movement was also growing, the KMT decided to let Tangwai supervise the vote counting.

The KMT was divided over the endorsement as the incumbent Huang Chi-jui was briefly suspended from office for three years during fraud probe, later acquitted. Eventually former city councillor Chou Pai-lien (周百鍊) was nominated by the party.

For the Tangwai camp, former mayor Henry Kao, who withdrew at the last moment in the previous election, decided to run for the office again, citing the KMT's concession on counting supervision. However, the authorities bribed Kao's campaign team, including Huang Hsin-chieh, later leader of Tangwai movement, by offering a free tour to the south until the end of the election. Others in the team were rumoured to have turned against Kao.

Other than Kao, Chen Yi-sung (陳逸松) and Li Sheng-yuan (李鉎源) also registered as independent candidates, raising concern of vote spitting within Tangwai bloc planned by the KMT. Li, a suspected party agent later revealed by Kao's team, was even able to commemorate the February 28 uprising, a political taboo for the regime, further strengthening the accusation. Chen later wrote in his memoir that he ran in the election because Kao told him he is not planning to run for office and pledged to support his campaign. Another independent, Li Chien-sheng (李建生) who is a friend of Kao, joined the race only because Kao wanted to ensure all planned 550 polling stations could be supervised by Tangwai's volunteers, as each candidate can only send 292 personnel.

Regarded as one of the most competitive poll, Kuomintang launched an all-scale smear campaign against Kao through media and schools. Central Daily News, KMT's party media, reported scandals of Kao for days, but was seen as ineffective to hamper Kao.

On the voting day, electoral frauds were again suspected as vote counting briefly suspended. Members in Kao's team were also given torches in case the authorities created blackouts to stuff ballots.

As a result, Kao was again elected as the mayor of Taipei with 51% of votes, defeating KMT's Chou.

Mayor of Taipei
Candidate	Party	Votes	%
Henry Kao	Independent	191,838	51.49
Chou Pai-lien	Kuomintang	176,117	47.27
陳逸松	Independent	3,322	0.89
李鉎源	Independent	761	0.20
李建生	Independent	561	0.15
Total		372,599	100.00
Valid votes		372,599	98.17
Invalid/blank votes		6,939	1.83
Total votes		379,538	100.00
Registered voters/turnout		516,761	73.45

=== Keelung ===
Mayor of Keelung
Candidate	Party	Votes	%
Lin Fan-wang	China Democratic Socialist Party	51,255	55.50
謝清雲	Kuomintang	41,091	44.50
Total		92,346	100.00
Valid votes		92,346	97.14
Invalid/blank votes		2,722	2.86
Total votes		95,068	100.00
Registered voters/turnout		122,321	77.72

=== Taoyuan ===
Under rotating leadership between local factions of Taoyuan, Chen Chang-shou was nominated by the Kuomintang to hold the magisterial seat, while CDSP member Huang Yu-chiao (黃玉嬌) ran as an independent and was supported by Hakka constituents.

Despite Huang Yu-chiao presented evidence of electoral frauds, the judge declined to overturn the election result by claiming that the rigged votes could not impact the election result.

Magistrate of Taoyuan
Candidate	Party	Votes	%
Chen Chang-shou	Kuomintang	78,520	59.13
Huang Yu-chiao	Independent	52,936	39.87
曹成金	Independent	773	0.58
王新順	Independent	559	0.42
Total		132,788	100.00
Valid votes		132,788	98.60
Invalid/blank votes		1,882	1.40
Total votes		134,670	100.00
Registered voters/turnout		246,531	54.63

=== Hsinchu ===
Magistrate of Hsinchu
Candidate	Party	Votes	%
Peng Jui-lu	Kuomintang	177,626	100.00
Total		177,626	100.00
Valid votes		177,626	97.64
Invalid/blank votes		4,302	2.36
Total votes		181,928	100.00
Registered voters/turnout		233,133	78.04

=== Miaoli ===
Magistrate of Miaoli
Candidate	Party	Votes	%
Lin Wei-kung	Kuomintang	86,489	65.72
邱慶彰	Independent	45,109	34.28
Total		131,598	100.00
Valid votes		131,598	98.13
Invalid/blank votes		2,513	1.87
Total votes		134,111	100.00
Registered voters/turnout		207,188	64.73

=== Taichung ===
Magistrate of Taichung
Candidate	Party	Votes	%
林鶴年	Kuomintang	127,336	60.24
何金生	Kuomintang	84,036	39.76
Total		211,372	100.00
Valid votes		211,372	97.17
Invalid/blank votes		6,151	2.83
Total votes		217,523	100.00
Registered voters/turnout		296,051	73.47

Mayor of Taichung
Candidate	Party	Votes	%
張啟仲	Kuomintang	65,689	57.30
蔡志昌	Independent	32,123	28.02
何春木	Independent	16,826	14.68
Total		114,638	100.00
Valid votes		114,638	98.09
Invalid/blank votes		2,230	1.91
Total votes		116,868	100.00
Registered voters/turnout		150,232	77.79

=== Changhua ===
Lu Shih-ming (呂世明) from KMT was endorsed by the party and the powerful local camp of "red faction". The rivalry "white faction" was indecisive on the representative after three successive heavyweights gave up in just three weeks, finally settled the matter by sending doctor Hung Tiao (洪挑). The unsuccessful negotiation brokered by the Kuomintang between the two camps paved way for one of the fiercest elections in Changhua's election.

Shih Hsi-hsun of the Tangwai, whose three magisterial bids all failed, supported his former rival Lu for re-election, which was believed to be decisive in his narrow victory but also infuriated the "white faction".

Magistrate of Changhua
Candidate	Party	Votes	%
Lu Shih-ming	Kuomintang	157,752	51.03
Hung Tiao	Kuomintang	151,409	48.97
Total		309,161	100.00
Valid votes		309,161	97.93
Invalid/blank votes		6,527	2.07
Total votes		315,688	100.00
Registered voters/turnout		418,611	75.41

=== Nantou ===
Magistrate of Nantou
Candidate	Party	Votes	%
楊昭璧	Kuomintang	117,095	100.00
Total		117,095	100.00
Valid votes		117,095	98.18
Invalid/blank votes		2,171	1.82
Total votes		119,266	100.00
Registered voters/turnout		196,578	60.67

=== Yunlin ===
Wishing to discourage the local factions, Kuomintang nominated outsider Liao Chen-hsiang, a civil servant in Taiwan Government, in a surprise. While the public was unfamiliar Liao as he had long lived in Taipei, the local factions endorsed Lin Heng-sheng, secretary of incumbent Lin Chin-seng who was also chosen as the successor.

Lin, with quite a certain victory in hand, did not enter the race after persuaded by a third party, while Liao's father announced donating NT$1 million as scholarship as a show of willingness to serve Yunlin, which could be an act of electoral bribery. Running unopposed, Liao was successfully elected. Lin would succeed Liao nine years later.

Magistrate of Yunlin
Candidate	Party	Votes	%
Liao Chen-hsiang	Kuomintang	284,421	100.00
Total		284,421	100.00
Valid votes		284,421	98.74
Invalid/blank votes		3,642	1.26
Total votes		288,063	100.00
Registered voters/turnout		313,638	91.85

=== Chiayi ===
Magistrate of Chiayi
Candidate	Party	Votes	%
何茂取	Kuomintang	103,928	54.85
許竹模	Independent	82,863	43.73
張源泉	Kuomintang	2,681	1.41
Total		189,472	100.00
Valid votes		189,472	97.61
Invalid/blank votes		4,645	2.39
Total votes		194,117	100.00
Registered voters/turnout		332,337	58.41

=== Tainan ===
Initially three candidates seek KMT's nomination for the magisterial election: Liu Po-wen, an official in county government representing the "sea faction"; Liao Chien-ting, Speaker of the County Council from the "mountain faction"; Li Yao-chien, doctor and former party agent also from "mountain faction". Just before receiving the anticipated endorsement from the party, Liao received a threatening letter with a bullet, forcing him to withdraw. The party later agreed to an open competition between Liu and Li.

Although both supported by heavyweights (incumbent and former magistrate), with more political donation, Liu defeated Li, whose controversial background damaged his popularity, in a landslide. The new magistrate was attacked for allegedly lying his education history during and after election by Li, and was eventually resolved in court by ruling in favour of him.

Magistrate of Tainan
Candidate	Party	Votes	%
Liu Po-wen	Kuomintang	176,833	61.80
Li Yao-chien	Kuomintang	109,296	38.20
Total		286,129	100.00
Valid votes		286,129	97.70
Invalid/blank votes		6,724	2.30
Total votes		292,853	100.00
Registered voters/turnout		370,264	79.09

In the middle of his term, Hsin Wen-bing intended to resign as he could not withstand Kuomintang's bureaucratic pressure, but was urged to stay on by the Taiwan Government. As the election approached, KMT favoured Hsin for re-election. Nevertheless, Hsin decided not to seek for another term after believing the political comeback of Tangwai's Yeh Ting-kuei is likely successfully.

Kuomintang reluctantly supported Provincial Councillor Huang Yeh (黃業) after multiple candidates declined to run. During election, Huang was engulfed in financial difficulties and was declared bankrupt, damaging his reputation. Yeh was elected with over 51% of votes, defeating the other three candidates, including CDSP's, and starting his third non-consecutive mayoral term.

Mayor of Tainan
Candidate	Party	Votes	%
Yeh Ting-kuei	Independent	65,099	51.13
Huang Yeh	Kuomintang	61,055	47.95
魏東安	China Democratic Socialist Party	603	0.47
翁余森櫻	Independent	576	0.45
Total		127,333	100.00
Valid votes		127,333	97.99
Invalid/blank votes		2,615	2.01
Total votes		129,948	100.00
Registered voters/turnout		171,640	75.71

=== Kaohsiung ===
Yu Teng-fa, who was elected in the last election as a Tangwai candidate, was ousted after he cut spending of local Kuomintang, and was barred from running again. He therefore supported his son Yu Jui-yen (余瑞言) in the election. Kuomintang again nominated Tai Liang-ching (戴良慶) to run. Tai captured 58% of votes and defeated inexperience Yu.

Magistrate of Kaohsiung
Candidate	Party	Votes	%
Tai Liang-ching	Kuomintang	114,552	57.70
Yu Jui-yen	Independent	83,962	42.30
Total		198,514	100.00
Valid votes		198,514	98.07
Invalid/blank votes		3,906	1.93
Total votes		202,420	100.00
Registered voters/turnout		295,891	68.41

Mayor of Kaohsiung
Candidate	Party	Votes	%
Chen Chi-chuan	Kuomintang	96,451	61.82
楊金虎	China Democratic Socialist Party	44,436	28.48
李源棧	Independent	14,140	9.06
簡秋桐	Independent	987	0.63
Total		156,014	100.00
Valid votes		156,014	98.87
Invalid/blank votes		1,779	1.13
Total votes		157,793	100.00
Registered voters/turnout		245,401	64.30

=== Pingtung ===
Kuomintang surprisingly nominated Chang Feng-hsu from the powerful "Chang faction", outgoing Provincial Councillor and son of inaugural magistrate Chang Shan-chung, breaking the precedence of nominating incumbent for re-election.

Tangwai movement endorsed County Councillor Huang Chen-san (黃振三) to challenge Chang, forcing the first competitive election in Pingtung. Huang, who also garner support from incumbent Lee Shih-chang and anti-Chang "Lin faction", gave much pressure to Chang Feng-hsu. As results showed, despite winning the election, Chang lost in nearly all towns except the strongholds in aboriginal settlements.

Magistrate of Pingtung
Candidate	Party	Votes	%
Chang Feng-hsu	Kuomintang	117,562	58.44
Huang Chen-san	Young China Party	83,591	41.56
Total		201,153	100.00
Valid votes		201,153	97.57
Invalid/blank votes		5,005	2.43
Total votes		206,158	100.00
Registered voters/turnout		309,418	66.63

=== Hualien ===
Magistrate of Hualien
Candidate	Party	Votes	%
柯丁選	Kuomintang	101,863	100.00
Total		101,863	100.00
Valid votes		101,863	98.60
Invalid/blank votes		1,450	1.40
Total votes		103,313	100.00
Registered voters/turnout		233,133	44.32

=== Taitung ===
Two potential candidates, Lin Shang-ying (林尚英) from "Wu faction" and Hsu Tien-chih (許添枝) from "Huang faction", but both withdrew as involved in separate criminal probes. The party lastly nominated township chief Chang Chen-hsiung (張振雄) who was unaffiliated to either faction. Huang Shun-hsing from Young China Party also ran in the poll with public's support.

Risking expulsion from KMT, Lin ran in the election and formed an alliance with Huang to protest against party's nomination. Huang was expected to revoke his registration, giving way to Lin and for himself to run in next year's provincial election. However, Lin's candidacy was rejected by the authorities as he was suspended pending investigation, becoming the only candidate failed the vetting in the local elections. Seen as a confrontation from the local party, the "Wu faction" turned against the party, while "Huang faction" also supported Huang Shun-hsing in low profile.

As all Kuomintang candidates were elected in the past Taitung elections, Chang was widely expected to assume office as the new magistrate, and neither he nor the local party pay much effort in campaign. However, in a huge setback for the KMT, Huang beat Chang by around 4,000 votes, or 6%.

Magistrate of Taitung
Candidate	Party	Votes	%
Huang Shun-hsing	Young China Party	38,934	53.13
Chang Chen-hsiung	Kuomintang	34,345	46.87
Total		73,279	100.00
Valid votes		73,279	95.23
Invalid/blank votes		3,671	4.77
Total votes		76,950	100.00
Registered voters/turnout		105,172	73.17

=== Penghu ===
Magistrate of Penghu
Candidate	Party	Votes	%
蔣祖武	Kuomintang	38,174	100.00
Total		38,174	100.00
Valid votes		38,174	98.27
Invalid/blank votes		672	1.73
Total votes		38,846	100.00
Registered voters/turnout		46,479	83.58

== By-elections ==
By-elections were held in Keelung and Nantou after two leaders died in office in 1965 and 1967 respectively. Kuomintang held the Nantou seat while flipping from CDSP in Keelung.
