= 1951 Miaoli magisterial by-election =

← 1951	8–29 July 1951	1954 →
- Turnout: 67.52% (final round)

Candidate	Lai Shun-sheng	Li Pai-pin
Party	Kuomintang	Independent
Popular vote (Final round)	75,608	25,162
Percentage	75.03%	24.97%
Magistrate before election
Liu Ting-kuo (annulled)
Kuomintang
Elected Magistrate
Lai Shun-sheng
Kuomintang

A by-election for Magistrate of Miaoli County, Taiwan was held in July 1951 following the annulled result for general election. Following three rounds of voting, the ruling Kuomintang was confirmed to have held the seat.

== Background ==
Miaoli County in Taiwan

Miaoli County held the first-ever direct election on 1 April 1951, with Liu Ting-kuo (劉定國) elected as the first magistrate. On 1 May Liu assumed office on the inauguration ceremony, while the election result was under challenge by defeated Huang Yun-chin (黃運金) and two other voters on the grounds that Liu was a serving military officer.

Taiwan High Court ruled on 2 May in favour of Huang and that Liu was unduly elected. With the election result annulled, Liu, in office for only one day, became the first disqualified local leader due to election petition. Ex-magistrate Teng Chung-yen (鄧仲演) became the interim magistrate following the appointment by the chairman of Taiwan Provincial Government.

Discontent with the verdict, supporters of Liu campaigned for reinstating Liu. Letters were written to President Chiang Kai-shek, Premier Chen Cheng, and to the Legislative Yuan, arguing his candidacy was approved by the authorities beforehand and hence the officials should be responsible, instead of ousting Liu. Liu also appealed to the court, believing the judge cited legal requirements that had not finished parliamentary proceedings.

Under the electoral laws, a by-election shall be held within thirty days after the vacancy occurred. Taiwan Government then announced the by-election to be held on 8 July 1951. Despite wishing to run again for the office, Liu was not enlisted amongst the seven official candidates of the by-election.

== Result ==
With a turnout at around 38.7%, a re-run was triggered as the threshold was not met. The rainy weather and the busy farming season were said to have discouraged the voting.

Voters again returned to the polling station on 22 July, which eventually saw a larger turnout at over 60% following official's urge to vote. The top two candidates entered the second round held on 29 July. Lai Shun-sheng (賴順生) from the ruling Kuomintang was elected, although falling behind in the two previous rounds of voting as Li Pai-pin (李白濱), from the Young China Party who ran as an independent, was forced to withdraw under pressure from the government. He was later appointed as an advisor to the Taiwan Government as compensation.

1951 Miaoli magisterial by-election (invalid due to low turnout)
Candidate	Party	Votes	%
黃焜發	Independent	13,644	23.84
Li Pai-pin	Independent	12,063	21.08
Lai Shun-sheng	Kuomintang	11,570	20.22
黃發盛	Independent	9,776	17.08
邱克修	Independent	5,030	8.79
張子斌	Independent	4,569	7.98
楊日恩	Independent	571	1.00
Total		57,223	100.00
Valid votes		57,223	97.47
Invalid/blank votes		1,485	2.53
Total votes		58,708	100.00
Registered voters/turnout		151,756	38.69

1951 Miaoli magisterial by-election
Candidate	Party	First round		Second round	
Candidate	Party	Votes	%	Votes	%
Lai Shun-sheng	Kuomintang	29,145	29.99	75,608	75.03
Li Pai-pin	Independent	30,275	31.15	25,162	24.97
黃焜發	Independent	29,111	29.96		
黃發盛	Independent	3,211	3.30		
邱克修	Independent	2,117	2.18		
張子斌	Independent	2,080	2.14		
楊日恩	Independent	1,237	1.27		
Total		97,176	100.00	100,770	100.00
Valid votes		97,176	97.59	100,770	98.34
Invalid/blank votes		2,395	2.41	1,698	1.66
Total votes		99,571	100.00	102,468	100.00
Registered voters/turnout		151,756	65.61	151,756	67.52
