= 1960 Taiwanese local elections =

← 1957	24 April 1960	1964 →

All 21 mayors/magistrates of cities, counties
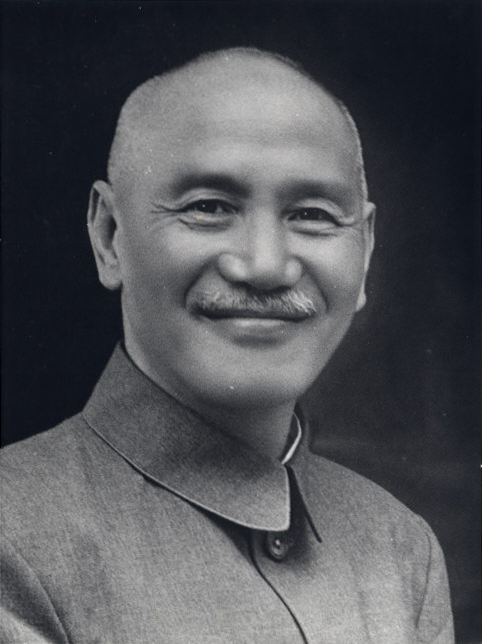

	Majority party	Minority party	Third party
Leader	Chiang Kai-shek	Unclear (Note: The leadership of China Democratic Socialist Party had been disputed following the death of Hsu Fu-lin in 1958.)	None
Party	Kuomintang	Democratic Socialist	Independent
Popular vote	2,339,200	43,948	775,823
Percentage	72.02%	1.35%	23.89%
Swing	▲6.64pp
Mayors/ Magistrates	19	1	1
Change	▼1	Steady
- Kuomintang; Independents; Not up for election (Yangmingshan, Fuchien)

Local elections were held in Taiwan on 24 April 1960, the fourth nation-wide elections in post-war Taiwan, electing all 21 mayors of cities and magistrates of counties with a four-year tenure. Fuchien Province, then under military administration, was not up for election. Election for Taiwan Provincial Council was held alongside the local elections to elect 73 councillors.

The ruling Kuomintang (KMT) controlled 19 administrative divisions after the election. Democratic Socialists (CDSP) were represented on city-level again after winning Keelung election, while Tangwai opposition was elected in Kaohsiung in the fallout of last election's controversial election fraud.

== Summary ==
The list below shows the statistics of party membership of candidates standing in the election. Coloured box refers to the party membership of elected mayor or magistrate.

	KMT	CDSP	Youth	Ind
Taipei County	1			1
Taipei City	1			1
Keelung City	1	1		
Yilan County	1			
Taoyuan County	1			
Hsinchu County	1			1
Miaoli County	1			
Taichung County	1			1
Taichung City	1			1
Changhua County	1			2
Nantou County	1			
Yunlin County	1		1	
Chiayi County	1			1
Tainan County	1			
Tainan City	1			1
Kaohsiung County	1			1
Kaohsiung City	1			
Pingtung County	1			
Hualien County	1			1
Taitung County	1			1
Penghu County	1			

Re-elected incumbents are: Huang Chi-jui (Taipei City), Hung Chiao-jung (Nantou County), Lin Chin-sheng (Yunlin County), Huang Tzung-kun (Chiayi County), Hu Lung-pao (Tainan County), Huang Tuo-jung (Taitung County).

== Detailed results ==
=== Taipei ===
Magistrate of Taipei
Candidate	Party	Votes	%
謝文程	Kuomintang	189,868	69.60
劉秉義	Independent	82,948	30.40
Total		272,816	100.00
Valid votes		272,816	93.84
Invalid/blank votes		17,910	6.16
Total votes		290,726	100.00
Registered voters/turnout		424,613	68.47

The anticipated political comeback of Henry Kao was at last abandoned in surprise. Kao first registered to run in the mayoral election in March before leaving for Europe and America, but he announced revoking his registration after he returned a month later. Kao blamed Kuomintang for not allow supervision of vote counting, which he believed he could not prevent the party from rigging the election. But public speculated the withdrawal was related to his extramarital affairs.

The sudden quit from the election frustrated some of his Tangwai colleague. Huang Hsin-chieh, later Taipei City Councillor and leader of Tangwai movement, for example, turned passive in helping Kao in the 1964 mayoral poll.

Mayor of Taipei
Candidate	Party	Votes	%
Huang Chi-jui	Kuomintang	217,314	79.55
林清安	Independent	55,860	20.45
Total		273,174	100.00
Valid votes		273,174	93.24
Invalid/blank votes		19,792	6.76
Total votes		292,966	100.00
Registered voters/turnout		427,041	68.60

=== Keelung ===
Two potential candidates emerged within the Kuomintang for the mayoral election, Tsai Huo-pao (蔡火炮), Keelung-born Speaker of City Council, and Li Kuo-chun (李國俊), long-time head of local party branch from Hubei. As mainland Chinese migrant (or waishengren) has already ruled Keelung for ten years, demands over a local mayor grew which gave rise to the favouring of Tsai. Perhaps in light of this situation, Tsai was arrested for smuggling, apparently by the secret police, while Li was nominated by the party after green-light at the party headquarter from Chiang Ching-kuo, President's son, and Secretary-general Tang Tsung (唐縱).

There were resentments within the party for backing another migrant for election, a government official was even considering breaking apart from the party and ran as an independent, only to be stopped after a meeting with Vice President Chen Cheng. Soon after taking over from Li as local party branch, Liu Ting-kuo resigned in protest against Li's nomination.

The Tangwai bloc was represented by former City Councillor Lin Fan-wang (林番王).

Li initially led over Lin but was then taken over as campaigning continued. Party infighting undermined Li's reputation after Li's problematic business was disclosed. Free China Journal also lambasted Li over last election's fraud and after he was revealed to have appointed a rapist, who was then expelled from Kuomintang, in the local party.

Amidst the increasingly dire situation, Keelung police were ordered by Tang Tsung to ban businesses celebrating for Lin. Businessmen, unions, temples, and even brothels were forced to donate for Li. Government-controlled newspapers, on the other hand, attacked Lin on his troubled marriage. A primary school teacher even assault a student after he voted for Lin in a mock election, and parents were threatened against rallying for Lin. These cohesive and suppressive actions, along with the biased campaigning favouring Li, infuriated the general public.

The election eventually saw Keelung-born Lin winning 55% of popular votes. The exhausted mayor-in-waiting was then in the hospital bed when news broke. When interviewed by the press, Lin commented "election is indeed like a basketball: the harder you hit it, the higher it bounces back."

Mayor of Keelung
Candidate	Party	Votes	%
Lin Fan-wang	China Democratic Socialist Party	43,948	54.55
Li Kuo-chun	Kuomintang	36,617	45.45
Total		80,565	100.00
Valid votes		80,565	93.91
Invalid/blank votes		5,224	6.09
Total votes		85,789	100.00
Registered voters/turnout		108,781	78.86

=== Yilan ===
Magistrate of Yilan
Candidate	Party	Votes	%
林才添	Kuomintang	106,057	100.00
Total		106,057	100.00
Valid votes		106,057	92.94
Invalid/blank votes		8,055	7.06
Total votes		114,112	100.00
Registered voters/turnout		155,374	73.44

=== Taoyuan ===
Magistrate of Taoyuan
Candidate	Party	Votes	%
吳鴻麟	Kuomintang	124,791	100.00
Total		124,791	100.00
Valid votes		124,791	87.60
Invalid/blank votes		17,669	12.40
Total votes		142,460	100.00
Registered voters/turnout		214,423	66.44

=== Hsinchu ===
Magistrate of Hsinchu
Candidate	Party	Votes	%
彭瑞鷺	Kuomintang	84,612	53.64
林維洲	Independent	73,137	46.36
Total		157,749	100.00
Valid votes		157,749	97.04
Invalid/blank votes		4,814	2.96
Total votes		162,563	100.00
Registered voters/turnout		209,061	77.76

=== Miaoli ===
Kuomintang unexpectedly supported Lin Wei-kung (林為恭) from a local noble family as Magistrate of Miaoli, greatly upsetting Taiwan Provincial Councillor Liu Kuo-tsai who was very eager to secure the nomination. Liu was rumoured to be delisted by Chiang Kai-shek as he had been reported during February 28 incident for possessing guns. Lin, when nominated, was serving as the deputy for the brother of Vice President Chen Cheng, which might explain his political advancement. Kuomintang's decision is also regarded as to consolidate the rotation of power between two local factions, Lin's "Wang faction" and the "Liu faction".

Magistrate of Miaoli
Candidate	Party	Votes	%
Lin Wei-kung	Kuomintang	112,761	100.00
Total		112,761	100.00
Valid votes		112,761	92.90
Invalid/blank votes		8,623	7.10
Total votes		121,384	100.00
Registered voters/turnout		190,634	63.67

=== Taichung ===
Magistrate of Taichung
Candidate	Party	Votes	%
何金生	Kuomintang	106,075	53.37
王地	Independent	92,687	46.63
Total		198,762	100.00
Valid votes		198,762	96.42
Invalid/blank votes		7,371	3.58
Total votes		206,133	100.00
Registered voters/turnout		264,018	78.08

Mayor of Taichung
Candidate	Party	Votes	%
邱欽洲	Kuomintang	54,014	55.47
何春木	Independent	43,358	44.53
Total		97,372	100.00
Valid votes		97,372	97.22
Invalid/blank votes		2,785	2.78
Total votes		100,157	100.00
Registered voters/turnout		126,894	78.93

=== Changhua ===
Tangwai's Shih Hsi-hsun contested the magisterial seat for the third time, facing challenge from KMT-endorsed Lu Shih-ming (呂世明) and Yang Lien-chi (楊連基), expelled from the KMT after standing against party colleague in a township election.

Irregularities were again reported during election campaign, such as Kuomintang using dozens of billboard vehicles for rally despite only three were allowed.

This year's election was the repetition of 1954's between incumbent Chen Hsi-ching from the KMT and Shih Hsi-hsun from Tangwai, after Chen again secured party nomination. School teachers and students were urged to canvass for Lu, even music teachers taught Lu's electioneering song. Mayor of Changhua, an elected representative, demanded staff to join Lu's campaign team. On the election day, several polling stations experienced blackouts, while multiple ballots voting for Shih were counted into Lu's.

Lu was elected with around 59% of votes, sending the third defeat to Shih,

Magistrate of Changhua
Candidate	Party	Votes	%
Lu Shih-ming	Kuomintang	155,483	58.54
Shih Hsi-hsun	Independent	85,895	32.34
Yang Lien-chi	Independent	24,236	9.12
Total		265,614	100.00
Valid votes		265,614	96.89
Invalid/blank votes		8,525	3.11
Total votes		274,139	100.00
Registered voters/turnout		385,130	71.18

=== Nantou ===
Magistrate of Nantou
Candidate	Party	Votes	%
Hung Chiao-jung	Kuomintang	123,399	100.00
Total		123,399	100.00
Valid votes		123,399	94.74
Invalid/blank votes		6,855	5.26
Total votes		130,254	100.00
Registered voters/turnout		177,690	73.30

=== Yunlin ===
Lin Chin-seng was chosen by the Kuomintang for re-election, standing against Youth's Su Tung-chi (蘇東啟). Huang Wen-tou (黃文斗) from the Kuomintang briefly registered as a candidate, rebelling against Lin after anti-Lin camp failed to convince Speaker Wu Hsing-wang (吳興旺) to run. However, Huang revoked his candidacy just nine days later.

Magistrate of Yunlin
Candidate	Party	Votes	%
Lin Chin-seng	Kuomintang	114,282	56.20
Su Tung-chi	Young China Party	89,066	43.80
Total		203,348	100.00
Valid votes		203,348	95.90
Invalid/blank votes		8,698	4.10
Total votes		212,046	100.00
Registered voters/turnout		285,157	74.36

=== Chiayi ===
Magistrate of Chiayi
Candidate	Party	Votes	%
Huang Tzung-kun	Kuomintang	109,347	54.09
許竹模	Independent	92,821	45.91
Total		202,168	100.00
Valid votes		202,168	96.92
Invalid/blank votes		6,427	3.08
Total votes		208,595	100.00
Registered voters/turnout		303,353	68.76

=== Tainan ===
Magistrate of Tainan
Candidate	Party	Votes	%
Hu Lung-pao	Kuomintang	210,637	100.00
Total		210,637	100.00
Valid votes		210,637	90.80
Invalid/blank votes		21,351	9.20
Total votes		231,988	100.00
Registered voters/turnout		339,610	68.31

Kuomintang in Tainan City nominated Hsin Wen-bing, Speaker of the City Council, to challenge incumbent Yeh Ting-kuei. The election was assumed by the party with great importance as it is one of the most competitive since the 1950 local elections. High-ranking members from the party headquarter travelled south to monitor the election, and asked the rebels in the party to support decisions from the party.

Yeh's manifesto was vetted by Tainan City election authority, demanding him to remove "irritative" wording such as "to defend democracy" and "to avoid Tainan City Government falling into hands of those for personal gain". Opposition leader Lei Chen criticised the interference by authorities. In the midst of voting, six helpers of Yeh's campaign team were brought away, and was released after election concluded.

With an extraordinary turnout of 85.4%, Hsin defeated Yeh and regained control for the Kuomintang. Electoral frauds were later reported by constituents, such as repeated voting, vote-buying, counting invalid votes for Hsin, or ballots cast by others. Tangwai called for annulling the election results but did not succeed. Tens of thousands joined Yeh in a rally after the election to demonstrate solidarity.

Mayor of Tainan
Candidate	Party	Votes	%
Hsin Wen-bing	Kuomintang	64,143	52.07
Yeh Ting-kuei	Independent	59,034	47.93
Total		123,177	100.00
Valid votes		123,177	97.73
Invalid/blank votes		2,858	2.27
Total votes		126,035	100.00
Registered voters/turnout		147,631	85.37

=== Kaohsiung ===
The ruling party nominated Tai Liang-ching (戴良慶) to run against opposition incumbent Yu Teng-fa. As last election was believed to be defrauded by the authorities, many expressed sympathy to Yu that bolstered his popularity.

Kuomintang still ran a large-scale electioneering for Tai with headmasters, teachers, and village chiefs. With the amendment of election regulations, it became more difficult to manipulate the poll through ballot stuffing. Tai was also under attack for KMT's role in rigging the previous election. Yu eventually captured most of the districts in Kaohsiung County, not only in the stronghold of "black faction", but also in those of "white faction", and even Tai's own "red faction".

Magistrate of Kaohsiung
Candidate	Party	Votes	%
Yu Teng-fa	Independent	108,637	56.47
Tai Liang-ching	Kuomintang	83,754	43.53
Total		192,391	100.00
Valid votes		192,391	96.84
Invalid/blank votes		6,270	3.16
Total votes		198,661	100.00
Registered voters/turnout		263,124	75.50

Kaohsiung mayoral election, in contrast, was relatively calm as "local faction" sent Chen Chi-chuan, whose family was close to President Chiang, to run for mayor, which was endorsed by Kuomintang. Despite unwilling to stand in the election, Chen conceded to party's pressure and was elected without contest after Yang Chin-hu (楊金虎) of the opposition withdrew.

Mayor of Kaohsiung
Candidate	Party	Votes	%
Chen Chi-chuan	Kuomintang	144,545	100.00
Total		144,545	100.00
Valid votes		144,545	94.44
Invalid/blank votes		8,506	5.56
Total votes		153,051	100.00
Registered voters/turnout		197,400	77.53

=== Pingtung ===
Magistrate of Pingtung
Candidate	Party	Votes	%
李世昌	Kuomintang	168,735	100.00
Total		168,735	100.00
Valid votes		168,735	89.87
Invalid/blank votes		19,019	10.13
Total votes		187,754	100.00
Registered voters/turnout		276,347	67.94

=== Hualien ===
Magistrate of Hualien
Candidate	Party	Votes	%
柯丁選	Kuomintang	55,771	62.70
徐輝國	Independent	33,176	37.30
Total		88,947	100.00
Valid votes		88,947	96.74
Invalid/blank votes		3,002	3.26
Total votes		91,949	100.00
Registered voters/turnout		113,341	81.13

=== Taitung ===
"Huang faction" leader Huang Tuo-jung (黃拓榮) was backed by Kuomintang, while the rival "Wu faction" secretly helped independent Lin Te-tsun (林德村). But as the anti-Huang camp turned against Lin, Huang's anticipated victory became increasingly clear.

Magistrate of Taitung
Candidate	Party	Votes	%
Huang Tuo-jung	Kuomintang	44,974	65.17
Lin Te-tsun	Independent	24,034	34.83
Total		69,008	100.00
Valid votes		69,008	95.65
Invalid/blank votes		3,142	4.35
Total votes		72,150	100.00
Registered voters/turnout		88,728	81.32

=== Penghu ===
Magistrate of Penghu
Candidate	Party	Votes	%
徐詠黎	Kuomintang	32,021	100.00
Total		32,021	100.00
Valid votes		32,021	94.96
Invalid/blank votes		1,701	5.04
Total votes		33,722	100.00
Registered voters/turnout		42,482	79.38
