= Chen Chien-ping =

Taiwanese banker

Chen Chien-ping MLY
- 陳建平

Member of the Legislative Yuan
- In office 1 February 1993 – 31 January 1996
- Constituency: Kaohsiung 2

Personal details
- Born: 8 April 1960 (age 66) Kaohsiung, Taiwan
- Party: Kuomintang
- Education: University of Southern California (BA); California State Polytechnic University, Pomona (MBA)
- Profession: Banker

Chen Chien-ping (Chinese: 陳建平; pinyin: Chén Jiànpíng; born 8 April 1960) is a Taiwanese banker.

== Early life and education ==
Chen was born in Kaohsiung, Taiwan, on 8 April 1960. He was educated in the United States, where he graduated from the University of Southern California in 1987 with a Bachelor of Arts (B.A.) in financial management and then earned a Master of Business Administration (M.B.A.) from California State Polytechnic University, Pomona, in 1991.

== Career ==
Chen is the CEO of Fengbao Asset Management Co. Ltd. He held a management role with the Ta Chong Bank, which in 2015 was acquired by Taiwan Cooperative Bank.

== See also ==
- Chen Chi-chuan
