= Council constituencies in Taiwan =

This is a list of electoral districts for local council elections in Taiwan.

== List ==
Division	#	Area or electorate	Members 2018
Taipei City	1	Beitou, Shilin	13
Taipei City	2	Neihu, Nangang	9
Taipei City	3	Songshan, Xinyi	10
Taipei City	4	Zhongshan, Datong	8
Taipei City	5	Zhongzheng, Wanhua	8
Taipei City	6	Daan, Wenshan	13
Taipei City	7	Lowland aborigines	1
Taipei City	8	Highland aborigines	1
New Taipei City	1	Shimen, Sanzhi, Tamsui, Bali	4
New Taipei City	2	Linkou, Wugu, Taishan, Xinzhuang	11
New Taipei City	3	Luzhou, Sanchong	9
New Taipei City	4	Banqiao	9
New Taipei City	5	Zhonghe	6
New Taipei City	6	Yonghe	3
New Taipei City	7	Shulin, Yingge, Xinzhuang, Tucheng, Sanxia	10
New Taipei City	8	Xindian, Shenkeng, Shiding, Pinglin, Wulai	5
New Taipei City	9	Pingxi, Ruifang, Shuangxi, Gongliao	1
New Taipei City	10	Jinshan, Wanli, Xizhi	4
New Taipei City	11	Lowland aborigines	3
New Taipei City	12	Highland aborigines	1
