= 1957 Taiwanese local elections =

Elections in Taiwan

← 1954	21 April 1957	1960 →

All 21 mayors/magistrates of cities, counties
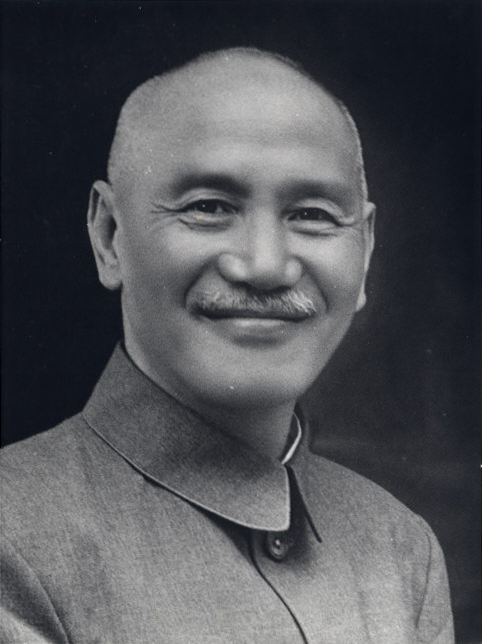
	Majority party	Minority party
Leader	Chiang Kai-shek	None
Party	Kuomintang	Independent
Percentage	65.38%	34.62%
Swing	▼3.47pp	▲3.47pp
Mayors/ Magistrates	20	1
Change	▲1	▼1
- Kuomintang; Independents; Not up for election (Yangmingshan, Fuchien)

Local elections were held in Taiwan on 21 April 1957, the third nation-wide elections in post-war Taiwan, electing all 21 mayors of cities and magistrates of counties with a three-year tenure. Fuchien Province, then under military administration, was not up for election. Election for Provisional Taiwan Provincial Council was held alongside the local elections to elect 66 councillors.

The ruling Kuomintang (or nationalist, KMT) retained control of 20 administrative divisions, flipping two from Tangwai movement, leaving the opposition with Tainan City only after defeating the nationalist candidate. Widespread election frauds were reported, while the struggle between local factions in different regions continued.

== Summary ==
The list below shows the statistics of party membership of candidates standing in the election. Coloured box refers to the party membership of elected mayor or magistrate.

	KMT	CDSP	Youth	Ind
Taipei County	1			
Taipei City	1			2
Keelung City	1			1
Yilan County	1			1
Taoyuan County	1			1
Hsinchu County	1			1
Miaoli County	1			1
Taichung County	1			1
Taichung City	1			1
Changhua County	1			1
Nantou County	1			1
Yunlin County	1		1	
Chiayi County	1			1
Tainan County	1			1
Tainan City	1			1
Kaohsiung County	1			1
Kaohsiung City	1	1		
Pingtung County	1			
Hualien County	1			1
Taitung County	1			1
Penghu County	1			

== Detailed results ==
=== Taipei ===
Magistrate of Taipei
Candidate	Party	Votes	%
戴德發	Kuomintang	229,413	100.00
Total		229,413	100.00
Valid votes		229,413	94.79
Invalid/blank votes		12,606	5.21
Total votes		242,019	100.00
Registered voters/turnout		362,849	66.70

Seeking re-election, Mayor Henry Kao stood against KMT-nominated Huang Chi-jui (黃啟瑞). According to students of National Taiwan Normal University, only Huang was invited to give a speech.

During vote counting, multiple electricity outage fueled suspicions over election fraud, and the number of invalid ballots reached 8,000, nearly all were in favour of Kao.

As a result, Huang captured the capital for the ruling party with around 59% of valid votes. Kao responded with "gentleman doesn't care about results as justice shall prevail", "I rather lose with honour than win with disgrace".

Mayor of Taipei
Candidate	Party	Votes	%
Huang Chi-jui	Kuomintang	176,238	58.88
Henry Kao	Independent	121,508	40.60
林清安	Independent	1,559	0.52
Total		299,305	100.00
Valid votes		299,305	97.28
Invalid/blank votes		8,363	2.72
Total votes		307,668	100.00
Registered voters/turnout		376,870	81.64

=== Keelung ===
Mayor of Keelung
Candidate	Party	Votes	%
謝貫一	Kuomintang	38,613	73.56
諸寶恆	Independent	13,882	26.44
Total		52,495	100.00
Valid votes		52,495	92.05
Invalid/blank votes		4,534	7.95
Total votes		57,029	100.00
Registered voters/turnout		96,995	58.80

=== Yilan ===
Magistrate of Yilan
Candidate	Party	Votes	%
甘阿炎	Kuomintang	64,171	58.02
陳旺全	Independent	46,437	41.98
Total		110,608	100.00
Valid votes		110,608	97.52
Invalid/blank votes		2,816	2.48
Total votes		113,424	100.00
Registered voters/turnout		142,239	79.74

=== Taoyuan ===
Magistrate of Taoyuan
Candidate	Party	Votes	%
張芳燮	Kuomintang	88,439	62.27
曹成金	Independent	53,583	37.73
Total		142,022	100.00
Valid votes		142,022	97.57
Invalid/blank votes		3,538	2.43
Total votes		145,560	100.00
Registered voters/turnout		187,440	77.66

=== Hsinchu ===
After incumbent magistrate Chu Sheng-chi (朱盛淇) supported rival of the Kuomintang in 1955 election for Speaker of the County Council, Chu was not nominated by the party for re-election.

Magistrate of Hsinchu
Candidate	Party	Votes	%
鄒滌之	Kuomintang	88,534	56.94
鄭鴻源	Independent	66,953	43.06
Total		155,487	100.00
Valid votes		155,487	97.73
Invalid/blank votes		3,616	2.27
Total votes		159,103	100.00
Registered voters/turnout		188,780	84.28

=== Miaoli ===
Magistrate of Miaoli
Candidate	Party	Votes	%
劉定國	Kuomintang	81,494	59.04
何允文	Independent	56,542	40.96
Total		138,036	100.00
Valid votes		138,036	97.46
Invalid/blank votes		3,596	2.54
Total votes		141,632	100.00
Registered voters/turnout		179,845	78.75

=== Taichung ===
Lin He-nien (林鶴年), former Taichung Magistrate, was again nominated by the Kuomintang. Clashes between local factions continued, with "Lin faction" supporting Lin and "Chen faction" supporting Yang Chi-chen (楊基振) from Tangwai.

Opposition accused election frauds as strongholds of Yang experienced electricity outrage at night during vote counting, leaving polling stations with staff only.

Magistrate of Taichung
Candidate	Party	Votes	%
Lin He-nien	Kuomintang	111,620	62.78
Yang Chi-chen	Independent	66,188	37.22
Total		177,808	100.00
Valid votes		177,808	96.82
Invalid/blank votes		5,844	3.18
Total votes		183,652	100.00
Registered voters/turnout		243,159	75.53

Mayor of Taichung
Candidate	Party	Votes	%
Lin Chin-piao	Kuomintang	47,273	58.56
何春木	Independent	33,453	41.44
Total		80,726	100.00
Valid votes		80,726	96.63
Invalid/blank votes		2,815	3.37
Total votes		83,541	100.00
Registered voters/turnout		111,368	75.01

=== Changhua ===
This year's election was the repetition of 1954's between incumbent Chen Hsi-ching from the KMT and Shih Hsi-hsun from Tangwai, after Chen again secured party nomination.

Some of Shih's supporters were arrested during election rally, angering residents to protest outside the police station, while Kuomintang smeared Shih with personal attacks. On the election day, frauds such as blackouts and village chiefs voting on behalf of villagers that were reported in last election occurred again. Eventually Shih only received around 42% of votes, lower than the expected 140,000 and was defeated.

Magistrate of Changhua
Candidate	Party	Votes	%
Chen Hsi-ching	Kuomintang	143,884	57.52
Shih Hsi-hsun	Independent	106,273	42.48
Total		250,157	100.00
Valid votes		250,157	96.60
Invalid/blank votes		8,815	3.40
Total votes		258,972	100.00
Registered voters/turnout		351,807	73.61

=== Nantou ===
Magistrate of Nantou
Candidate	Party	Votes	%
洪樵榕	Kuomintang	75,994	61.22
蔡瑞水	Independent	48,138	38.78
Total		124,132	100.00
Valid votes		124,132	97.10
Invalid/blank votes		3,707	2.90
Total votes		127,839	100.00
Registered voters/turnout		158,461	80.68

=== Yunlin ===
Wang Yin-kuei (王吟貴), ex-speaker of Yunlin County Council, ran for Young China Party and as a Tangwai candidate, fighting against Lin Chin-sheng, nominated by the KMT to stage a political comeback. As Wang was more popular than Lin, the local party announced from the local administration that towns with high turnout and support rate for Lin would receive government subsidies. The local KMT also launched smearing campaign against the rivalry, claiming Wang "stirred troubles", "divided the community", and "publicly assaulted the governance". The defamatory speeches and vote-buying acts, although suspected of breaking election laws, were not penalised by the authorities.

On the election day, it was reported that staff at polling station marked the ballot paper in favour of Lin on behalf of a blind despite the elector insisted on voting for Wang. Lin eventually defeated Wang by a landslide.

Magistrate of Yunlin
Candidate	Party	Votes	%
Lin Chin-seng	Kuomintang	132,145	63.72
Wang Yin-kuei	Young China Party	75,229	36.28
Total		207,374	100.00
Valid votes		207,374	97.17
Invalid/blank votes		6,029	2.83
Total votes		213,403	100.00
Registered voters/turnout		263,296	81.05

=== Chiayi ===
Magistrate of Chiayi
Candidate	Party	Votes	%
黃宗焜	Kuomintang	109,475	54.04
李茂松	Independent	93,104	45.96
Total		202,579	100.00
Valid votes		202,579	97.46
Invalid/blank votes		5,278	2.54
Total votes		207,857	100.00
Registered voters/turnout		278,452	74.65

=== Tainan ===
Magistrate of Tainan
Candidate	Party	Votes	%
胡龍寶	Kuomintang	178,248	68.60
吳拜	Independent	81,579	31.40
Total		259,827	100.00
Valid votes		259,827	97.67
Invalid/blank votes		6,211	2.33
Total votes		266,038	100.00
Registered voters/turnout		314,893	84.49

In Tainan City, Yeh Ting-kuei (葉廷珪) completed a political revenge, being elected to the mayorship again and as the only independent winner of this election after leaving the KMT before the election. His friendliness to grassroot community is believed the crucial factor of his victory.

Mayor of Tainan
Candidate	Party	Votes	%
Yeh Ting-kuei	Independent	62,056	58.51
楊請	Kuomintang	44,001	41.49
Total		106,057	100.00
Valid votes		106,057	97.50
Invalid/blank votes		2,715	2.50
Total votes		108,772	100.00
Registered voters/turnout		129,624	83.91

=== Kaohsiung ===
With the unresolved disputes between two powerful local factions, Kuomintang nominated Chen Chi-hsing (陳皆興), an obscure councillor as the candidate. The two factions therefore turned to Yu Teng-fa, who was convinced to prevent an uncontested election.

Irregularities were reported after around 200 voters of one constituency discovered their ballots had been cast by others, who in turn demanded explanation despite police's threats. Results revealed that only two constituents out of 1,063 did not vote. Yu was also defeated unexpectedly.

Following the defeat, Yu filed petition to dispute the election results, which was obstructed by agents of KMT as voters attempted to testify at court. Officials at polling stations were accused by Yu of rigging the election by fingerprinting on the electoral roll "like playing the piano" to get the ballot papers. Nevertheless, the court only convicted two staff members and decided not to charge the others. The court further rejected annulling the results on the basis that "one polling station is not enough to impact the election result". The verdict effectively blocked any vote re-count proposed by Tangwai in the next thirty years. Kuomintang, therefore, was mocked by the public when insisting elections were "honest, fair, and open" for "flagrant in vote-rigging, transparent in ballot-stuffing, and impartial in vote-buying".

Magistrate of Kaohsiung
Candidate	Party	Votes	%
Chen Chi-hsing	Kuomintang	118,255	62.93
Yu Teng-fa	Independent	69,650	37.07
Total		187,905	100.00
Valid votes		187,905	96.91
Invalid/blank votes		5,986	3.09
Total votes		193,891	100.00
Registered voters/turnout		244,923	79.16

Meanwhile, in Kaohsiung City, the Kuomintang was divided between sending incumbent mayor Hsieh Cheng-chiang (謝掙強) and City Council Speaker Chen Wu-chang (陳武璋). Chen at last secured party nomination. For the Tangwai camp, two leading potential candidates reached an agreement, with Yang Chin-hu (楊金虎), delegate of National Assembly, running in mayoral election with CDSP's nomination, while Li Yuan-chan (李源棧), a City Councillor, compete for the seat in Taiwan Provincial Council. With the support from most of the local factions, Chan easily defeated Yang.

Mayor of Kaohsiung
Candidate	Party	Votes	%
Chen Wu-chang	Kuomintang	86,409	64.70
Yang Chin-hu	China Democratic Socialist Party	47,138	35.30
Total		133,547	100.00
Valid votes		133,547	97.96
Invalid/blank votes		2,787	2.04
Total votes		136,334	100.00
Registered voters/turnout		168,907	80.72

=== Pingtung ===
Magistrate of Pingtung
Candidate	Party	Votes	%
林石城	Kuomintang	179,099	100.00
Total		179,099	100.00
Valid votes		179,099	92.55
Invalid/blank votes		14,419	7.45
Total votes		193,518	100.00
Registered voters/turnout		253,091	76.46

=== Hualien ===
Magistrate of Hualien
Candidate	Party	Votes	%
胡子萍	Kuomintang	60,087	70.87
徐輝國	Independent	24,703	29.13
Total		84,790	100.00
Valid votes		84,790	96.84
Invalid/blank votes		2,769	3.16
Total votes		87,559	100.00
Registered voters/turnout		101,876	85.95

=== Taitung ===
Magistrate of Taitung
Candidate	Party	Votes	%
黃拓榮	Kuomintang	53,659	83.27
黃忠	Independent	10,780	16.73
Total		64,439	100.00
Valid votes		64,439	95.96
Invalid/blank votes		2,716	4.04
Total votes		67,155	100.00
Registered voters/turnout		77,698	86.43

=== Penghu ===
Magistrate of Penghu
Candidate	Party	Votes	%
Lee Yu-lin	Kuomintang	32,434	100.00
Total		32,434	100.00
Valid votes		32,434	97.68
Invalid/blank votes		772	2.32
Total votes		33,206	100.00
Registered voters/turnout		39,881	83.26
