= Wang Chih-hsiung =

Taiwanese politician (born 1952)

- 王志雄
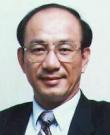
- Wang during his tenure on the Third Legislative Yuan

Member of the Legislative Yuan
- In office 1 February 1990 – 31 January 1993
- Constituency: Kaohsiung City 1
- In office 1 February 1996 – 31 January 1999
- Constituency: Kaohsiung City 2

Kaohsiung City Councilor
- In office 1 February 1999 – 31 January 2002

Personal details
- Born: 24 June 1952 (age 73) Kaohsiung County, Taiwan
- Party: Kuomintang
- Relatives: Wang Yu-yun (father); Wang Shih-hsiung (brother)
- Education: National Taipei University (BA); University of Southern California (MBA)

Wang Chih-hsiung (Chinese: 王志雄; born 24 June 1952) is a Taiwanese banker and politician. Wang is a member of the Kuomintang who served on the Legislative Yuan from 1990 to 1993 and 1996 to 1999, and the Kaohsiung City Council between 1999 and 2002.

== Education ==
After graduating with a bachelor's degree in land administration from National Taipei University, Wang earned a Master of Business Administration (M.B.A.) degree from the University of Southern California.

== Political career ==
Wang Chih-hsiung's father, Wang Yu-yun, and younger brother Wang Shih-hsiung were also Kuomintang-affiliated politicians. The Wang brothers were elected to the Legislative Yuan together in 1989, with Wang Chih-hsiung representing Kaohsiung City's second district, and Wang Shih-hsiung representing the occupational constituency of fishing and aquaculture. Wang Chih-hsiung was elected to a non-consecutive term in the Legislative Yuan in 1995 for Kaohsiung City's first district. Wang Chih-hsiung subsequently ran in the December 1998 Taiwanese local elections, and was elected to the Kaohsiung City Council, serving from 1999 to 2002.

== Banking career and legal judgements ==
Wang Chih-hsiung was vice chairman and member of the board for the Chung Shing Bank led by his father. Wang Chih-hsiung continued serving in financial leadership positions throughout his tenure as a city councilor. In 2004, Wang Chih-hsiung was subpoenaed repeatedly as part of legal proceedings and investigations into a credit loan case, but did not report to court. The case continued to trial in 2005, and Wang was placed on a wanted list. Wang fled Taiwan in 2007, and was arrested in China in 2012. The Taiwanese Ministry of Justice Investigation Bureau repatriated him in October 2012. Wang was formally indicted by Taipei-based prosecutors in December 2012. The Taipei District Court ruled that Wang Chih-hsiung was not guilty in September 2013.
