= Wang Shih-hsiung =

Taiwanese politician (1961–2024)

- 王世雄

Member of the Legislative Yuan
- In office 1 February 1990 – 31 January 1996
- Constituency: Fishing (1990–1993); Kaohsiung County (1993–1996)

Personal details
- Born: 1961 Kaohsiung County, Taiwan
- Died: 20 March 2024 (aged 63) Kaohsiung, Taiwan
- Party: Kuomintang
- Relatives: Wang Yu-yun (father); Wang Chih-hsiung (brother)
- Education: National Chengchi University (BA)

Wang Shih-hsiung (Chinese: 王世雄; 1961 – 20 March 2024) was a Taiwanese politician. A member of Kuomintang, he served in the Legislative Yuan from 1990 to 1996.

== Personal life and political career ==
Wang Shih-hsiung's father Wang Yu-yun served as mayor of Kaohsiung from 1973 to 1981. In 1989, Wang Shih-hsiung was a Kuomintang candidate for the Legislative Yuan, representing aquaculture and fishers, and was elected to his first term in office alongside his brother Wang Chih-hsiung.

== Legal judgements ==
Wang was indicted on charges of bribery and fraud in 2000. In 2002, lawyer Tu Jin-shu alleged that he was kidnapped by Wan Chung and held at Wang Shih-hsiung's home in Kaohsiung. Wang was cited for drunk driving in 2006.

== Later life and death ==
In 2017, Wang Shih-hsiung was diagnosed with liver tumors, and later traveled to China to seek liver transplantation. Wang lost weight throughout 2023, and was twice admitted to the Chang Gung Hospital's Kaohsiung branch for treatment. Wang died of pancreatic cancer in Kaohsiung, on 20 March 2024, at the age of 63.
