= Hsieh Chin-ting =

Taiwanese judge and politician

- 謝金汀

Magistrate of Miaoli County
- In office 20 December 1981 – 20 December 1989
- Preceded by: Chiu Wen-kuang
- Succeeded by: Chang Chiu-hua

Personal details
- Born: 1936 Shinchiku, Taiwan, Empire of Japan
- Died: 25 April 2017 (aged 80–81) Taipei, Taiwan
- Party: Kuomintang
- Education: National Taiwan University (LLB)

Hsieh Chin-ting (Chinese: 謝金汀; 1936 – April 25, 2017) was a Taiwanese judge and politician.

== Life and career ==
Hsieh was born in 1936 to a family of farmers in Tōfun, Chikunan, Shinchiku Prefecture of Japanese Taiwan, which later became known as Shuiliugong, a division of Toufen, Miaoli County. He graduated from the School of Law of National Taiwan University and became a prosecutor and judge. With support from the Kuomintang, Hsieh was elected to two terms as Miaoli County Magistrate, serving between 1981 and 1989. He was a proponent of youth and amateur sports. During his magisterial tenure, Hsieh hosted the 1984 Taiwan Middle School Games and 1988 Taiwan Provincial Games. After the left the magistracy, Hsieh served in several roles within the Taiwan Provincial Government. He offered to return to his judicial post within the provincial government after it had been downsized, but the offer was rejected by the Judicial Yuan. The Chen Qingbo Culture and Education Foundation published Hsieh's autobiography in 1995. Hsieh died at home in Taipei on 25 April 2017, aged 81.
