= Yang Chin-hu =

Taiwanese politician

- 楊金虎
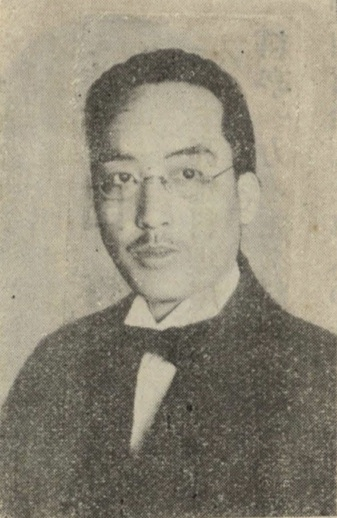

Mayor of Kaohsiung City
- In office 2 June 1968 – 1 February 1973
- Preceded by: Chen Chi-chuan
- Succeeded by: Wang Yu-yun

Personal details
- Born: 26 August 1898 Tainan, Taiwan, Empire of Japan
- Died: 12 July 1990 (aged 91) Taiwan
- Party: China Democratic Socialist Party
- Spouse(s): Chen Tsai-feng; Chung Yu-yeh

Yang Chin-hu (traditional Chinese: 楊金虎; simplified Chinese: 杨金虎; pinyin: Yáng Jīnhǔ; 26 August 1898 – 12 July 1990) was a Taiwanese politician. He was the Mayor of Kaohsiung City from 1968–1973.

== Political career ==
In 1947, Yang became a member of the National Assembly. He then later joined the China Democratic Socialist Party in 1948. In 1954, he ran for the Kaohsiung Mayoralty election and failed for four consecutive terms. However, he eventually won in 1968.

== Personal life ==
On 12 June 1971, the 72-year-old Yang was engaged to the 47-year-old Chen Tsai-feng, his housekeeper. Initially, Yang's two adult daughters opposed the marriage. Eventually, his daughters and their husbands finally gave up and attended the engagement ceremony of their father. His great-granddaughter is Natalie Lin, a comedian in New York City. On 5 February 1984, the 86-year-old Yang married to the 61-year-old Chung Yu-yeh in a traditional church ceremony.
