= 1940 Taiwanese prefectural elections =

- 20 November 1940

82 (of 164) seats in all prefectural assemblies
- Turnout: 98.51% (▼0.46pp)
Alliance	Japanese	Taiwanese
Seats won	44	38
Seat change	▲8	▼2

The Second Prefectural Assembly Elections (Japanese: 第二囘州會議員選擧) were held on 20 November 1940 in Taiwan under Japanese rule. According to the Japanese law, half members of prefectural assembly shall be elected by the members of local assembly and the other half shall be appointed by the Governor-General (Japanese: 總督). In this time, 82 seats from five prefectural assemblies were open for election. Voting was done by Electoral colleges (EC) formed by the more than 3,600 members of local assemblies. Around half of them were directly elected in the previous year, the other half were appointed by the prefectural governor (Japanese: 州知事).

The 1944 election was cancelled due to World War II, hence the tenure of the elected and appointed councilors was extended until the surrender of Japan in 1945.

== Electoral College size ==
Administrative divisions in Taiwan during Japanese rule

Only around 0.067% of the population were eligible to vote in the election, which includes 861 (or 0.29% of) "Japan Mainlanders" (Japanese: 內地人) in Taiwan and 2,824 (or 0.055% of) "Taiwan Islanders" (Japanese: 本島人; mainly Han Taiwanese).

Electoral district		Cities and counties	Seats	EC size
Taihoku	1st	Taihoku City	8	40
Taihoku	2nd	Kīrun City	3	28
Taihoku	3rd	Giran City	2	24
Taihoku	4th	Shichisei, Tansui, Kīrun, Bunsan, Kaizan, Shinshō	5	390
Taihoku	5th	Giran, Ratō, Suō	2	123
Taihoku	Total		20	605
Shinchiku	1st	Shinchiku City	3	26
Shinchiku	2nd	Chūreki, Daikei, Tōen	3	192
Shinchiku	3rd	Shinchiku, Chikutō, Chikunan, Byōritsu, Taiko	5	378
Shinchiku	Total		11	596
Taichū	1st	Taichū City	3	28
Taichū	2nd	Shōka City	3	27
Taichū	3rd	Daiton, Toyohara, Tōsei, Taikō	4	312
Taichū	4th	Shōka, Inrin, Hokuto	5	366
Taichū	5th	Nantō, Nītaka, Nōkō, Takeyama	3	156
Taichū	Total		18	889
Tainan	1st	Tainan City	4	31
Tainan	2nd	Kagi City	3	28
Tainan	3rd	Niitoyo, Shinka, Sobun, Hokumon	4	341
Tainan	4th	Shin'ei, Kagi, Tōseki	4	332
Tainan	5th	Toroku, Kobi, Hokukō	4	270
Tainan	Total		19	1,002
Takao	1st	Takao City	4	30
Takao	2nd	Heitō City	3	26
Takao	3rd	Okayama, Hōzan, Kizan	4	281
Takao	4th	Heitō, Chōshū, Tōkō, Kōshun	3	256
Takao	Total		14	593
Total			82	3,685

== Result ==
All 82 seats were elected. The overall turnout was at 98.51%, of which Taiwanese was higher than Japanese. 6 invalid electoral votes were found and 55 did not cast their votes. Amongst the elected prefectural assembly, 44 were Japanese and 38 were Taiwanese. The Governor-General then appointed 76 members, most of them were Japanese.

Election result
	Total	Prefectures				
	Total	Taihoku	Shinchiku	Taichū	Tainan	Takao
Valid votes	3,624	594	594	870	980	586
Invalid votes	6	1	0	2	3	0
Total votes	3,630	595	594	872	983	586
Eligible voters	3,685	605	596	889	1002	593
Turnout	98.51%	98.35%	99.66%	98.09%	98.10%	98.82%
Elected Japanese	44	12	6	7	11	8
Elected Taiwanese	38	8	5	11	8	6
Appointed Japanese	62	15	8	16	14	9
Appointed Taiwanese	20	5	3	2	5	5
