= Chang Chiu-hua =

Taiwanese politician (1937–2020)

- 張秋華

Magistrate of Miaoli County
- In office 20 December 1989 – 20 December 1993
- Preceded by: Hsieh Chin-ting
- Succeeded by: Ho Chih-hui

Personal details
- Born: 1937 Shinchiku, Taiwan, Empire of Japan
- Died: January 7, 2020 (aged 82–83) Miaoli City, Miaoli County, Taiwan
- Party: Kuomintang
- Education: National Taipei University

Chang Chiu-hua (Chinese: 張秋華; pinyin: Zhāng Qiūhuá; 1937–2020) was a Taiwanese politician. He was head of government in Miaoli Township and Miaoli City, then served a single four-year term as magistrate of Miaoli County.

== Life and career ==
Chang was born in Tō'oku, Byōritsu, Shinchiku Prefecture of Japanese Taiwan in 1937, which later became known as Touwu. He graduated from what became National Taipei University, and was later named one of the school's distinguished alumni. Chang was a schoolteacher prior to his election as mayor of Miaoli Township under the Kuomintang banner in 1973. He oversaw the municipal government through its reclassification as the county-controlled Miaoli City in 1981, and stepped down in 1982. Chang subsequently served on the second convocation of the Miaoli County Council, then as magistrate of Miaoli County between 1989 and 1993. Chang lost reelection to the magistracy in 1993 to political independent Ho Chih-hui.

Chang was diagnosed with liver cancer two months before his death and sought treatment at National Taiwan University Hospital. He died at Da Chien General Hospital in Miaoli on 7 January 2020, aged 83.
