= Wang Yu-yun =

Taiwanese politician (1925–2009)

- 王玉雲
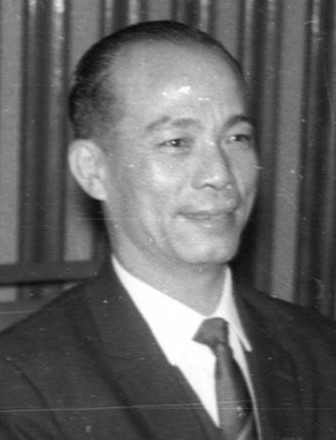

Mayor of Kaohsiung City
- In office 1 February 1973 – 21 June 1981
- Preceded by: Yang Chin-hu
- Succeeded by: Yang Chin-tsung

Personal details
- Born: 22 March 1925 Qieding, Takao, Taiwan, Empire of Japan
- Died: 17 August 2009 (aged 84) Hangzhou, Zhejiang, China
- Party: Kuomintang
- Children: Wang Chih-hsiung (son); Wang Shih-hsiung (son)

Wang Yu-yun (Chinese: 王玉雲; pinyin: Wáng Yǜyún; 22 March 1925 – 17 August 2009) was a Taiwanese politician. He was the Mayor of Kaohsiung City in 1973–1981.

== Early life ==
Wang obtained his education from the police academy.

== Early career ==
After graduation, Wang opened up his business in ship breaking and steel industries.

== Prosecution ==
Wang was indicted in April 2000 and was barred from leaving Taiwan starting in 2002. In April 2007, he was sentenced to prison after he was found guilty in misusing the funds of Chung Shing Commercial Bank (Chinese: 中興銀行) for more than NT$80 billion. He failed to report for his jail term, which was to begin on 15 September 2007. Subsequently, he was placed on the wanted list. He was suspected to have fled to mainland China and had transferred most of his wealth to the mainland and other countries.

== Death ==
Wang died on 17 August 2009 in Hangzhou, Zhejiang after a long illness.
