= National Taipei University =

National university in Taiwan

- 國立臺北大學
- Motto: 追求真理，服務人群(Pe̍h-ōe-jī: Tui-kiû Chin-lí, ho̍k-bū jîn-kûn)
- Motto in English: Searching for the truth and serving the people
- Type: Public
- Established: 1949
- President: Lee Chen-Jai (李承嘉)
- Undergraduates: 7,602 (2020)
- Postgraduates: 1,955 (2020)
- Location: New Taipei, Taiwan; 24.9463°N 121.3729°E
- Campus: 0.59 square kilometres (0.23 sq mi); Sansia and Taipei
- Website: www.ntpu.edu.tw

Chinese name
- Traditional Chinese: 國立臺北大學
- Simplified Chinese: 国立台北大学
Transcriptions
Standard Mandarin
- Hanyu Pinyin: Guólì Táiběi Dàxué
Southern Min
- Hokkien POJ: Kok-li̍p Tâi-pak Tāi-ha̍k

College of Law and Business, National Chung Hsing University
- Traditional Chinese: 國立中興大學法商學院
- Simplified Chinese: 国立中兴大学法商学院
Transcriptions
Standard Mandarin
- Hanyu Pinyin: Guólì Zhōngxīng Dàxué Fǎshāngxué Yuàn
Southern Min
- Hokkien POJ: Kok-li̍p Tiong-heng Tāi-ha̍k Hoat-siong Ha̍k-īⁿ

National Taipei University (NTPU; Chinese: 國立臺北大學; Pe̍h-ōe-jī: Kok-li̍p Tâi-pak Tāi-ha̍k), founded in 1949, is a national university in Taiwan. Before 2000, the university was named the College of Law and Business, National Chung Hsing University (Chinese: 國立中興大學法商學院). The university's main campus is in Sanxia District, New Taipei; its two other campuses are in Zhongshan District, Taipei, Taiwan.

== History and development ==
NTPU has undergone different stages of development. It began as the Taiwan Provincial College of Law and Business in 1949; it merged with and became the local Junior College of Administration and the specifically established Administrative Junior College. In 1961, it combined with the newly established College of Science and Engineering to become Taiwan Provincial Chung Hsing University. In 1964, the Evening School was set up on the Taipei Campus. In 1968 another Evening School and the College of Liberal Arts were added to the Taichung Campus. The university continued to grow in size, and in 1971 it became National Chung Hsing University. In February 2000, the Taipei Campus including the College of Law and Business and Taipei Evening School became National Taipei University.

So far, NTPU has signed MOUs and/or agreements with more than 110 universities worldwide to form partnerships. These partnerships are manifested through all kinds of programs for students and academic faculties, including international joint research, exchange scholars, visiting scholars, dual degrees, exchange programs, and internships.

NTPU and Fu Jen Catholic University are the representative university of New Taipei City by QS Most Affordable Cities for Students Ranking. In addition, NTPU has exchange and visiting students from America, India, Singapore, Hong Kong, China, France, Poland and other European countries.

== Campus ==
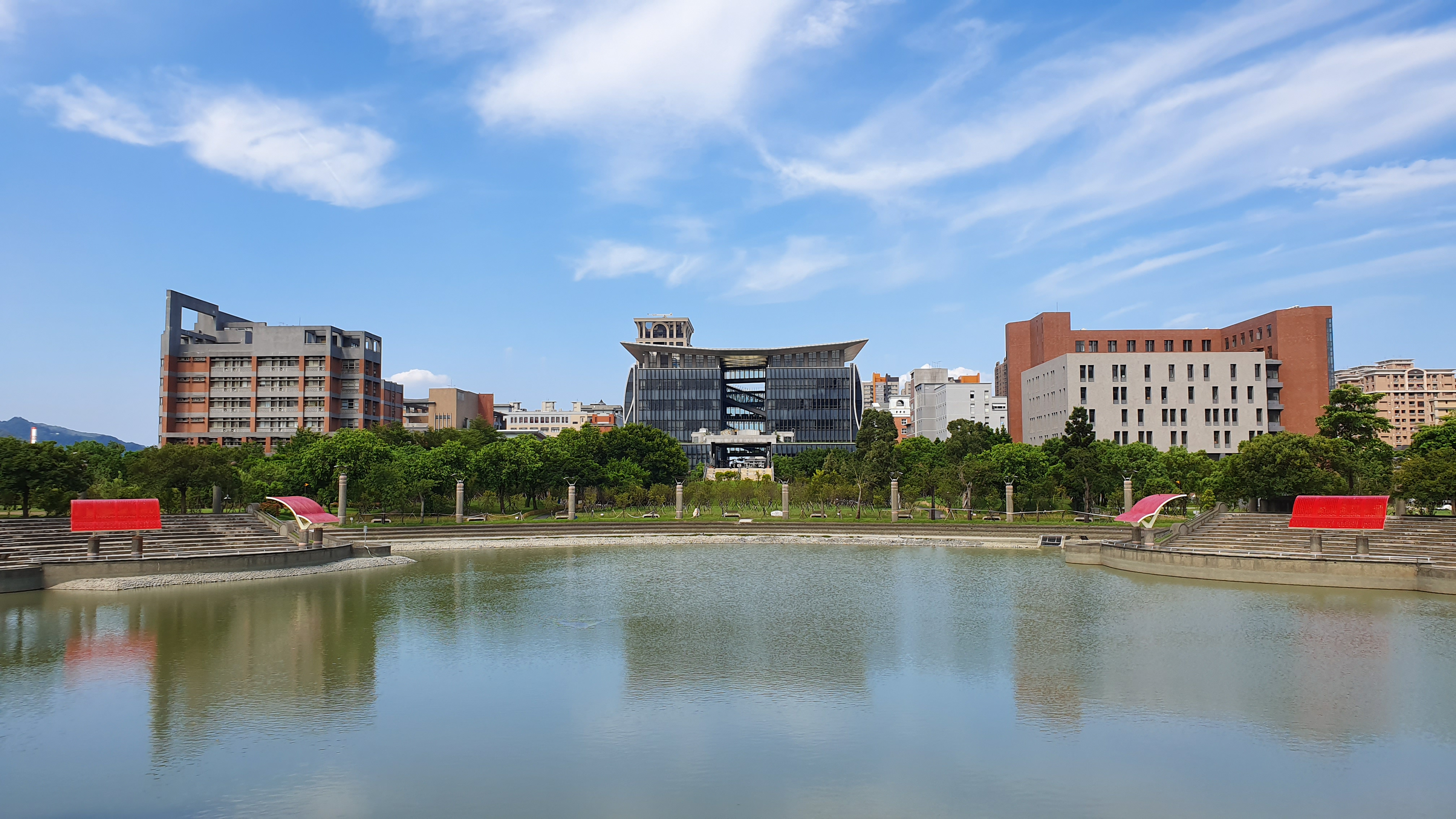
Sansia (Main) Campus

National Taipei University have Sansia (Main) Campus and Taipei Campus.

== Organization ==
The president heads the university, while each college is headed by a dean and each department by a chairman:

- College of Law
  - Department of Law
  - Graduate School of Law
  - The Center of Comparative Law Documentation
- College of Business
  - Department of Business Administration
  - Department of Banking & Cooperative Management
  - Department of Accountancy
  - Department of Statistics
  - Department of Recreational Sport Management
  - Graduate Institute of Information Management
  - Electronic Business Research Center (EBRC)
  - Center for Cooperative Economics & Non-Profit Organizations (CCENB)
  - EMBA in International Finance
  - Graduate Institute of International Business
- College of Public Affairs
  - Department of Public Administration and Policy
  - Department of Real Estate and Built Environment
  - Department of Public Finance
  - Graduate Institute of Urban Planning
  - Graduate Institute of Natural Resource Management
  - Research Center for Public Opinion and Election Studies
  - Center for Land Management and Technology
- College of Social Sciences:
  - Department of Economics
  - Department of Sociology
  - Department of Social Work
  - Graduate School of Criminology
  - Research Center for Taiwan Development
- College of Humanities
  - Department of Chinese Languages and Literature
  - Department of Foreign Languages and Applied Linguistics
  - Department of History
  - Graduate Institute of Folk Arts
  - Graduate Institute of Classical Texts
  - Center for International Negotiations and Interpretations (CINI)
- College of Electrical Engineering and Computer Science
  - Department of Computer Science and Information Engineering
  - Department of Communication Engineering
  - Department of Electrical Engineering

== Ranking ==
National Taipei University rankings

Global – Overall
- QS World: 1201-1400 (2024)
- THE World: 1501+ (2024)

Regional – Overall
- QS Asia: =373 (2025)
- THE Asia: 601+ (2024)

National – Overall
- QS National: 18–26 (2024)
- THE National: 35–45 (2024)

== Notable alumni ==
- Chang Chiu-hua, Magistrate of Miaoli County (1989-1993)
- Huang Hsin-chieh (Class of 1951) - politician, 3rd Chairperson of the Democratic Progressive Party (DPP)
- Perng Fai-nan - Governor of Central Bank of the Republic of China (1998-2018)
- Tseng Ming-chung - Chairperson of Financial Supervisory Commission (2013-2016)
- Amber Kuo - Singer and actress
- Janine Chang - Actress
- Freddy Lin - Captain of New Power Party (2015)
- Chiang Pin-kung - Vice President of Legislative Yuan (2002-2005)
- Lai Pin-yu - cosplayer, member of Legislative Yuan
- Lin Fong-cheng - Vice Chairman of Kuomintang (2007-2014)
- Lin Shu-fen - Member of Legislative Yuan
- Wang Ginn-wang - Minister of Coast Guard Administration (2006-2014)
- Wong Chin-chu - Minister of Cultural Affairs (2007-2008), Magistrate of Changhua County (2001-2005)
- Wu Chen-huan - Political Deputy Minister of Justice (2012-2015)
- Yu Shyi-kun - Premier of the Republic of China (2002-2005)

== See also ==
- List of universities in Taiwan
