= 1950–51 Taiwanese local elections =

Taiwanese local elections held in 1950–51

- 22 October 1950 – 29 July 1951

All 21 mayors/magistrates of cities, counties
- Turnout: 79.6%
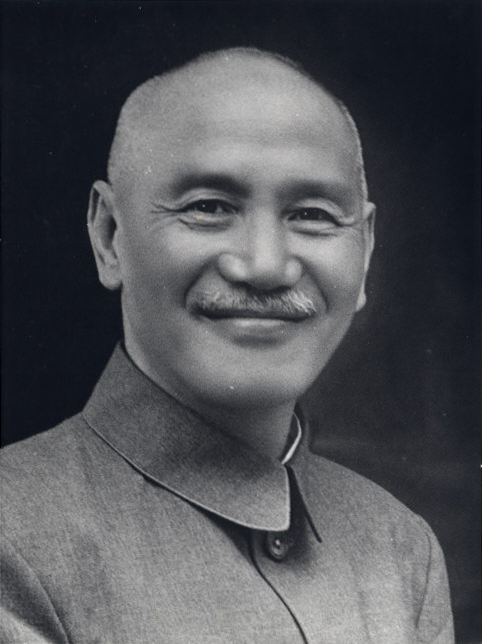

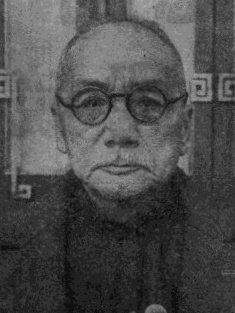
	Majority party	Minority party
Leader	Chiang Kai-shek	Hsu Fu-lin
Party	KMT	Democratic Socialist
Mayors/ Magistrates	17	1
- Kuomintang; China Democratic Socialist Party; Independents; Not up for election (Yangmingshan)

Local elections were held in Taiwan in 1950 and 1951, months after Chiang Kai-shek resumed duties as President of the Republic of China following the civil war defeat, marking the start of local autonomy in the post-war era.

The elections were also considered to be legitimising the Kuomintang's rule on the island, while attempting to strive for more support from the United States. They also provided the foundation for opposition Tangwai movement as non-KMT members tried to revolt against authoritarian rule through elections, and bred local powers and fractions that would impact the future elections. Some of the defeated contenders in these elections would eventually be elected or become leaders of the Tangwai movement.

== Background ==
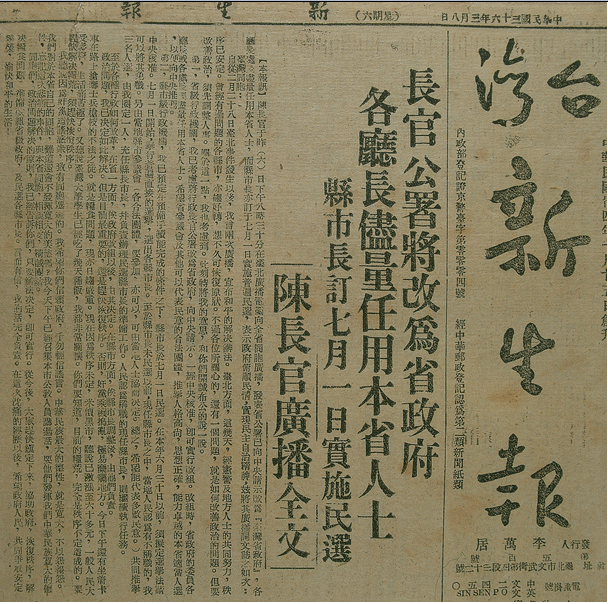
Newspaper on 6 March 1947 announcing "mayoral, magisterial elections set for 1 July"

Taiwan's electoral history could trace back to Japanese rule in 1935, but the suffrage by then was limited. In 1947, anti-government uprisings erupted, with protestors calling for political reform. Despite promising the implementation of reforms including local elections, Chen Yi, Chief Executive of Taiwan Province, secretly asked for reinforcement from mainland China to suppress the uprisings.

After the defeat in the Chinese Civil War, Chiang Kai-shek's Kuomintang government retreated to Taiwan in 1949. On 1 March 1950, Chiang declared the resumption of duties as the President of the Republic of China. The Government then announced in April plans for local elections, electing all 21 mayors of cities and magistrates of counties with a three-year term of office. City and County Council elections were organised also.

Chairmanship of the Taiwan Provincial Government and the councillorship of the Taiwan Provincial Consultative Council were both not open for direct election due to ongoing martial law, instead appointed or indirectly elected.

== Electoral system ==
According to "Election and Removal of Mayors and Magistrates of Taiwan Province Regulation" (Chinese: 臺灣省縣市長選舉罷免規程) promulgated in 1950, the election adopted the two-round, simple majority voting system.

A candidate shall be duly elected when the turnout is over 50% and received 50% of total votes cast (including invalid votes). If no candidates were elected, a runoff will be held within the next 20 days between the two leading candidates, with the one winning the most votes declared winner. If the two candidates received the same number of votes, lots will be drawn to determine the winner.

== Election timetable ==
The local elections were divided into eight stages:

Stage	Election period	Cities/Counties
First	12 August 1950 – 22 October 1950	Hualien County; Taitung County
Second	20 October 1950 – 7 January 1951	Taichung City; Tainan City; Keelung City; Penghu County
Second	20 October 1950 – 14 January 1951	Taipei City
Third	22 January 1951 – 25 March 1951	Kaohsiung City
Third	22 January 1951 – 1 April 1951	Pingtung County; Kaohsiung County
Fourth	28 January 1951 – 1 April 1951	Hsinchu County
Fourth	28 January 1951 – 8 April 1951	Taipei County; Taoyuan County
Fifth	3 February 1951 – 8 April 1951	Changhua County
Fifth	3 February 1951 – 22 April 1951	Yilan County
Sixth	10 February 1951 – 15 April 1951	Tainan County; Yunlin County
Sixth	10 February 1951 – 22 April 1951	Chiayi County
Seventh	5 March 1951 – 13 May 1951	Taichung County; Nantou County
Eighth	5 May 1950 – 29 July 1951	Miaoli County

== Summary ==
With a high turnout of 79.6%, KMT-backed candidates were elected in 17 out of 21 cities/counties, CDSP took one and the remaining were captured by independents.

The list below shows the statistics of party membership of candidates standing in the election. Coloured box refers to the party membership of elected mayor or magistrate.

	KMT	CDSP	Young	Ind
Hualien County	5	1		
Taitung County	5			2
Taichung City	3			2
Tainan City	5			1
Keelung City	3			2
Penghu County	3			1
Taipei City	9	1		4
Pingtung County	3			1
Kaohsiung County	2			2
Kaohsiung City	3			1
Taipei County	4			2
Taoyuan County	5			2
Hsinchu County	3			4
Changhua County	4			1
Yilan County	3			1
Tainan County	3			
Yunlin County	2			
Chiayi County	8			1
Taichung County	3			2
Nantou County	4	1	1	
Miaoli County	2			

== Detailed results ==
=== First stage ===
Magistrate of Hualien
Party	Candidate	First round		Second round	
Party	Candidate	Votes	%	Votes	%
Democratic Socialist	楊仲鯨	22,687	30.83	35,444	53.02
KMT	林茂盛	22,663	30.80	31,408	46.98
Independent	周坤祺	7,945	10.80		
Independent	李群山	7,068	9.61		
Independent	謝琳淼	6,745	9.17		
Independent	陳阿民	6,475	8.80		

Magistrate of Taitung
Party	Candidate	First round		Second round	
Party	Candidate	Votes	%	Votes	%
KMT	陳振宗	10,796	23.54	?	?
KMT	黃式鴻	11,784	25.70	?	?
Independent	周伸興	7,512	16.38		
Independent	鐘生鑑	7,102	15.49		
Independent	黃忠	6,292	13.72		
Independent	林作梅	1,601	3.49		
Independent	張慶萱	770	1.68		

=== Second stage ===
In Taichung mayoral election, lawyer Yang Chi-hsien (楊基先), with opposition background, defeated Kuomintang candidate Lin Chin-piao (林金標). Kuomintang members were reportedly forced to canvass for Lin and collect name and address of at least fifty voters, which angered some of the residents. According to KMT senior Chen Kuo-fu, Yang's well connection with the grassroot community contributed to his victory. The discontent with the ruling KMT following February 28 incident, along with his narrow-mindedness, also damaged Lin's popularity.

Despite winning a plurality in the first round, Yang was forced to a second round as more than 8,000 invalid votes were cast.

Mayor of Taichung
Party	Candidate	First round		Second round	
Party	Candidate	Votes	%	Votes	%
Independent	Yang Chi-hsien	34,441	51.27	38,406	55.64
KMT	Lin Chin-piao	24,828	36.96	30,614	44.36
Independent	廖朝舟	7,901	11.76		

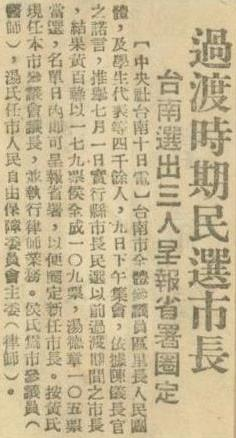
Tainan City Council chose three candidates for acting mayor on 9 March, upon appointment by the government, for pre-election transition

Mayor of Tainan
Party	Candidate	First round		Second round	
Party	Candidate	Votes	%	Votes	%
Independent	葉廷珪	16,648	26.51	46,156	67.29
KMT	黃百祿	16,926	26.95	22,435	32.71
KMT	吳國信	13,321	21.21		
KMT	邱鴻恩	9,816	15.63		
KMT	劉子祥	6,088	9.69		

Mayor of Keelung
Party	Candidate	Votes	%
KMT	謝貫一	34,905	57.48
Independent	陳炳煌	17,656	29.07
Independent	林番王	8,167	13.45

Magistrate of Penghu
Party	Candidate	Votes	%
KMT	李玉林	21,395	77.90
Independent	歐老萊	6,070	22.10

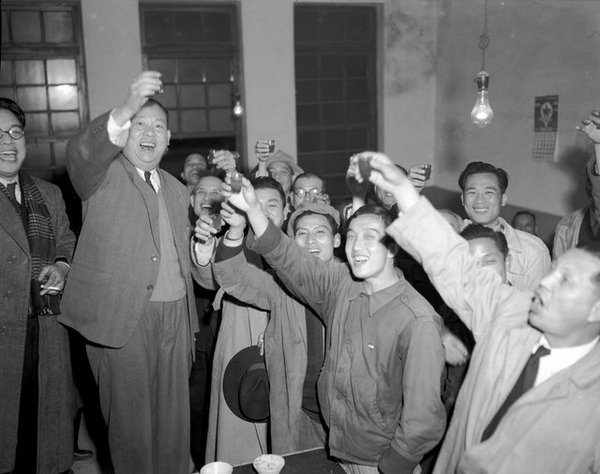
Wu San-lien (second left) celebrated with voters after elected

The Taipei mayoral election of the capital was one of the most competitive in the local elections, with six independent candidates and one KMT-supported.

In the memoir of Henry Kao, later Mayor of Taipei, then-chairman of Taiwan Provincial Government K. C. Wu convinced incumbent mayor Wu San-lien (吳三連) to run for re-election and fully supported him after considering multiple non-KMT candidates were elected, making him the first government official that supported opposition candidate. In protest against the decision, Lin Tzu-kuei (林紫貴), KMT delegate of the National Assembly, ran in the election, while China Democratic Socialist Party, to which Wu San-lien was affiliated despite running as an independent, endorsed Henry Kao instead of Wu.

KMT later urged Lin to withdraw from the competition. Lin in return demanded to be promoted as deputy minister or to compensate his election expenses, but were both rejected. Just a week before election, Lin was detained and jailed by secret police, allegedly harbouring communists.

Kao, who was nominated by others, decided not to campaign as he believed Wu was much respected and popular. As a result, Wu won in a landslide, garnering nearly 66% of votes. Soon after the poll concluded, Lin was released from jail.

Mayor of Taipei
Candidate	Party	Votes	%
Wu San-lien	Independent	92,061	65.61
Henry Kao	Independent	28,075	20.01
莊琮耀	Independent	12,348	8.80
郭伯儀	Independent	3,901	2.78
Lin Tzu-kuei	Kuomintang	2,223	1.58
鄭來春	Independent	984	0.70
蘇金塗	Independent	726	0.52
Total		140,318	100.00
Valid votes		140,318	97.89
Invalid/blank votes		3,026	2.11
Total votes		143,344	100.00
Registered voters/turnout		257,849	55.59

=== Third stage ===
Magistrate of Pingtung
Party	Candidate	First round		Second round	
Party	Candidate	Votes	%	Votes	%
KMT	張山鐘	66,061	49.51	93,393	60.23
Independent	孔德興	25,882	19.40	61,656	39.77
Independent	林嘯鯤	22,366	16.76		
Independent	陳朝景	11,599	8.69		
Independent	洪石柱	6,422	4.81		
Independent	杜德三	1,110	0.83		

Magistrate of Kaohsiung
Party	Candidate	First round		Second round	
Party	Candidate	Votes	%	Votes	%
KMT	洪榮華	54,399	35.59	90,803	50.84
Independent	陳新安	68,796	45.01	87,791	49.16
Independent	余登發	28,139	18.41		
KMT	吳崇雄	1,503	0.98		

Mayor of Kaohsiung
Party	Candidate	Votes	%
KMT	謝掙強	49,223	51.84
Independent	李源棧	41,984	44.22
KMT	林斌	3,738	3.94

=== Fourth stage ===
Magistrate of Taipei
Party	Candidate	First round		Second round	
Party	Candidate	Votes	%	Votes	%
KMT	梅達夫	85,109	46.17	173,389	79.20
KMT	廖富本	93,697	50.83	45,541	20.80
Independent	林兩端	3,533	1.92		
Independent	林燕清	1,994	1.08		

Magistrate of Taoyuan
Party	Candidate	First round		Second round	
Party	Candidate	Votes	%	Votes	%
KMT	徐崇德	40,878	35.26	?	?
KMT	徐言	46,199	39.84	?	?
Independent	陳阿頭	15,151	13.07		
Independent	黃宗寬	6,450	5.56		
Independent	魏肇潤	3,663	3.16		
Independent	黃又安	3,608	3.11		

Magistrate of Hsinchu
Party	Candidate	Votes	%
KMT	朱盛淇	76,854	72.01
KMT	古侃	22,447	21.03
Independent	王繼呂	6,731	6.31
Independent	解慶文	698	0.65

=== Fifth stage ===
During election, Chen Hsi-ching (陳錫卿), then mayor of Changhua, told the less-educated farmers that posting his election leaflet could "prevent swine fever". Chen eventually achieved a simple majority in the election without a second round.

Magistrate of Changhua
Party	Candidate	Votes	%
KMT	Chen Hsi-ching	153,875	62.93
KMT	陳萬福	50,631	20.70
KMT	于國楨	35,709	14.60
Independent	黃漢樹	4,321	1.77

In Yilan County, a second round of election was arranged due to a total of 4,239 invalid votes in the first round, which blocked the election of independent Chen Wang-chuan (陳旺全). Following a widespread campaign by the KMT, the party-backed candidate Lu Tsuan-hsiang (盧纘祥) was elected in the second round despite losing the first.

Magistrate of Yilan
Party	Candidate	First round		Second round	
Party	Candidate	Votes	%	Votes	%
KMT	Lu Tsuan-hsiang	45,119	48.29	?	?
Independent	Chen Wang-chuan	48,324	51.71	?	?

=== Sixth stage ===
Magistrate of Tainan
Party	Candidate	Votes	%
KMT	高文瑞	106,631	51.09
KMT	蔡愛仁	52,742	25.27
KMT	高錦德	49,323	23.63

Magistrate of Yunlin
Party	Candidate	Votes	%
KMT	吳景徽	103,753	54.85
KMT	廖昆金	85,408	45.15

Hsu Shih-shien (許世賢) is the first female candidate of magisterial elections in the country, but would only be elected seventeen years later in 1968.

Magistrate of Chiayi
Party	Candidate	First round		Second round	
Party	Candidate	Votes	%	Votes	%
KMT	林金生	71,569	41.10	101,482	52.04
Independent	李茂松	80,491	46.22	93,541	47.96
KMT	許世賢	22,078	12.68		

=== Seventh stage ===
Originally registered as independent, Lin He-nien (林鶴年) joined the Kuomintang before second round of voting.

Magistrate of Chiayi
Party	Candidate	First round		Second round	
Party	Candidate	Votes	%	Votes	%
KMT	Lin He-nien	58,330	32.30	88,055	52.11
KMT	陳水潭	72,735	40.28	80,921	47.89
Independent	蔡卯生	40,716	22.55		
Independent	陳振順	7,532	4.17		
Independent	呂大樁	1,277	0.71		

Magistrate of Nantou
Party	Candidate	First round		Second round	
Party	Candidate	Votes	%	Votes	%
KMT	李國楨	59,047	50.61	75,063	64.01
Democratic Socialist	廖啟川	24,135	20.69	42,207	35.99
Youth	陳如商	20,223	17.33		
KMT	洪金園	13,257	11.36		

=== Eighth stage ===
A second round was held due to a total of 3,364 invalid votes, blocking Liu Ting-kuo (劉定國) the leading candidate in the first round to receive 50% of the total votes.

Magistrate of Miaoli
Party	Candidate	First round		Second round	
Party	Candidate	Votes	%	Votes	%
KMT	Liu Ting-kuo	55,002	49.71	63,627	51.13
KMT	Huang Yun-chin	55,647	50.29	60,814	48.87

The election result was annulled by court as Liu was serving in the military and thus unqualified as a candidate, therefore triggering a by-election in July 1951.
