= 1954 Taiwanese local elections =

- 2 May 1954; 18 July 1954

All 21 mayors/magistrates of cities, counties
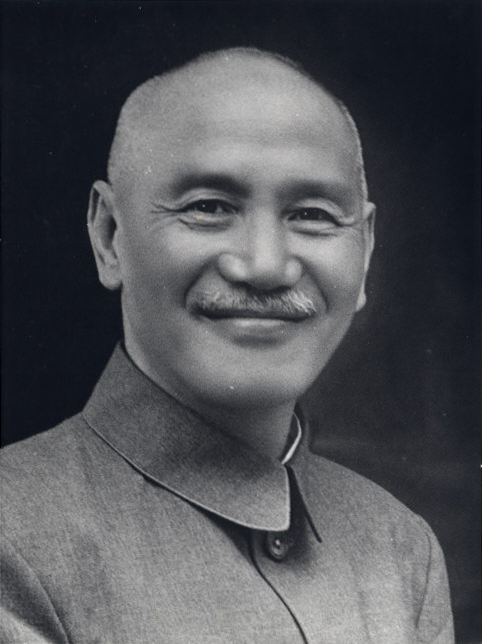
	Majority party	Minority party
Leader	Chiang Kai-shek	None
Party	Kuomintang	Independent
Percentage	68.85%	31.15%
Mayors/ Magistrates	19	2
Change	▲2	▼1
- Kuomintang; Independents; Not up for election (Yangmingshan, Chekiang, Fuchien)

Local elections were held in Taiwan in 1954, the second nation-wide elections in the post-war era of Taiwan, electing all 21 mayors of cities and magistrates of counties. The election for the Provisional Taiwan Provincial Council was held alongside the local elections to elect 57 councillors.

As the incumbent mayors/magistrates across the country were elected in eight different stages, resulting in various terms of office, the Government decided to extend the tenures of 19 mayors/magistrates for several months to end on 1 June 1954, except Miaoli and Taichung as the magistrates of both were elected in subsequent by-elections.

The unified local elections for the nineteen administrative divisions were held on 2 May 1954, with the same three-year term of office. Miaoli and Taichung elections were held on 18 July 1954, with shorter tenures that would end on the same day as the other local leaders in 1957.

== Electoral system ==
According to the amended "Election and Removal of Mayors and Magistrates of Taiwan Province Regulation" (Chinese: 臺灣省縣市長選舉罷免規程), the election abolished several requirements compared to the last: the two-round system was abandoned, while simple majority system was replaced by the first-past-the-post system. Thresholds requiring 50%-plus turnout and total votes cast (including invalid votes) were abolished. A candidate receiving the most votes shall be declared elected. If two candidates receive the same number of votes, lots will be drawn to determine the winner.

== Summary ==
The Kuomintang won in a landslide, capturing 19 out of 21 divisions after flipping in Taichung City, Tainan City, and Hualien County. Incumbent Chiayi Magistrate was defeated by an independent, and Taipei Mayorship continued to be in the hand of the independents.

The list below shows the statistics of party membership of candidates standing in the election. The coloured box refers to the party membership of the elected mayor or magistrate.

	KMT	CDSP	YCP	Ind
Taipei County	1			
Taipei City	1			1
Keelung City	1			
Yilan County	1			2
Taoyuan County	1			1
Hsinchu County	1			1
Taichung County	1			
Taichung City	1			1
Changhua County	1			2
Nantou County	1			
Yunlin County	1			
Chiayi County	1			1
Tainan County	1		1	
Tainan City	2			1
Kaohsiung County	1			
Kaohsiung City	1	1		
Pingtung County	1			
Hualien County	?	?		?
Penghu County	1			1
Miaoli County	1			2
Taitung County	1			

== Detailed results ==
=== Taipei ===
Magistrate of Taipei
Candidate	Party	Votes	%
戴德發	Kuomintang	231,035	100.00
Total		231,035	100.00
Valid votes		231,035	96.08
Invalid/blank votes		9,428	3.92
Total votes		240,463	100.00
Registered voters/turnout		312,589	76.93

Kuomintang nominated Lt. Gen. Wang Min-ning (王民寧), former head of Taiwan Province police service during the February 28 incident, as the candidate for the Taipei mayoral election. The opposition was represented by Henry Kao, who briefly lived in the United States after last election's defeat. American reporters in Taiwan, who had been in touch with Kao, also reported on his election campaign. After understanding Kao's secret engagement with the American Embassy, Kuomintang seniors were concerned about Kao.

The past of Wang in the 1940s was being dig up and harmed his popularity, including detaining a doctor criticising him for pushing in at hospital, and his leading role during the suppression of February 28 uprising. Wang was also described as out of touch as he was not living in Taiwan for quite some time. According to party members of Kuomintang, Wang's campaign even tried bribing voters with food, who in turn destroyed Wang's election leaflets and then helped with Kao's canvassing. Kao, on the other hand, pursued pro-grassroot campaigning and was praised for his humbleness.

Amidst critical situation with Wang, Chiang Ching-kuo, son of President Chiang, met with heads of intelligence services to discuss further actions to help Wang. Taipei police then urged residents and shops to celebrate less for Kao but more for Wang, while Kuomintang agents groundless rumours over Kao as a CIA spy. This, however, bolstered his popularity as voters were angered by the oppressive governance and hoped Washington could pressure Taiwan Government to implement political reforms.

After voting concluded, the radio withheld announcing the results, only revealing Kao had more votes. William C. Chase, leader of the US Military Assistance Advisory Group in Taiwan, requested the United States Department of State to send a telegraph congratulating Kao's victory after discovering that vote counting stopped at night. Kao believed the telegraph forced Chiang Kai-shek to confirm the election result.

Former American Ambassador Wellington Koo later revealed that Chiang and party leaders were "very shocked and disappointed" over the defeat, while Kao believed the authorities did not stuff the ballot box because he was not considered to be a serious challenger. Seniors of Kuomintang's party headquarter and local branch, including Chang Chi-yun, resigned citing the loss.

Mayor of Taipei
Candidate	Party	Votes	%
Henry Kao	Independent	110,415	53.08
Wang Min-ning	Kuomintang	97,613	46.92
Total		208,028	100.00
Valid votes		208,028	96.87
Invalid/blank votes		6,713	3.13
Total votes		214,741	100.00
Registered voters/turnout		326,801	65.71

=== Keelung ===
Mayor of Keelung
Candidate	Party	Votes	%
謝貫一	Kuomintang	54,728	100.00
Total		54,728	100.00
Valid votes		54,728	88.40
Invalid/blank votes		7,183	11.60
Total votes		61,911	100.00
Registered voters/turnout		90,268	68.59

=== Yilan ===
Kan Ah-yen (甘阿炎) from the Kuomintang was elected.

Magistrate of Yilan
Candidate	Party	Votes	%
甘阿炎	Kuomintang	?	?
藍文炳	Independent	?	?
林振炎	Independent	?	?
Total		131,953	100.00
Valid votes		131,953	
Invalid votes		3,298	
Total votes		111,675	100.00
Registered voters/turnout		131,953	84.63

=== Taoyuan ===
Magistrate of Taoyuan
Candidate	Party	Votes	%
徐崇德	Kuomintang	?	?
翁瑞鉅	Independent	?	?
Total		133,352	100.00
Valid votes		130,352	
Invalid votes		3,000	
Total votes		133,352	100.00
Registered voters/turnout		172,865	77.14

=== Hsinchu ===
Chu Sheng-chi (朱盛淇) was re-elected, fending off challenge by local faction.

Magistrate of Hsinchu
Candidate	Party	Votes	%
Chu Sheng-chi	Kuomintang	72,040	56.77
張青雲	Independent	54,860	43.23
Total		126,900	100.00
Valid votes		126,900	92.89
Invalid/blank votes		9,706	7.11
Total votes		136,606	100.00
Registered voters/turnout		173,617	78.68

=== Taichung ===
Magistrate of Taichung
Candidate	Party	Votes	%
陳水潭	Kuomintang	133,604	100.00
Total		133,604	100.00
Valid votes		133,604	86.28
Invalid/blank votes		21,237	13.72
Total votes		154,841	100.00
Registered voters/turnout		225,984	68.52

Lin Chin-piao (林金標), who lost in last Taichung mayoral election, was nominated again by the Kuomintang, while Tangwai backed doctor Chang Shen-hsu (張深鑐) who long participated in anti-government protest movements. Lin's community work, along with the votes of sympathy over his last electoral defeat, were rewarded with a landslide victory, earning 67% of votes, while Chang was criticised to be too arrogant.

Mayor of Taichung
Candidate	Party	Votes	%
Lin Chin-piao	Kuomintang	51,003	66.93
Chang Shen-hsu	Independent	25,204	33.07
Total		76,207	100.00
Valid votes		76,207	97.38
Invalid/blank votes		2,052	2.62
Total votes		78,259	100.00
Registered voters/turnout		97,647	80.14

=== Changhua ===
Incumbent Changhua and former Changhua mayor Chen Hsi-ching (陳錫卿) was hugely supported by the public in the last election, as he was elected without heading to the run-off. But his popularity dropped as discontent in Changhua city grew over new policies that favoured rural rather than urban.

As multiple party members expressed interest in running in the magisterial election, Kuomintang organised a primary before the election. Lin Bo-yu (林伯餘), a famous doctor in Changhua seen as a great challenger to Chen, however, was eventually forced to quit the primary after pressure from Chen. Yang Ting-kuo, another primary candidate, was defeated by Chen, paving way for securing the nomination.

The dissatisfaction towards Chen over his tactics led to the endorsement of Shih Hsi-hsun, an activist during Japanese rule, by local politicians and local factions to run for Tangwai. With the support for Shih growing, local Kuomintang smeared Shih as an "illegal" candidate during unauthorisied canvassing. On the election day, rural villagers chiefs had allegedly voted on behalf of villagers, while election frauds were reported.

The official result announced saw Chen re-elected with a reduced majority.

Magistrate of Changhua
Candidate	Party	Votes	%
Chen Hsi-ching	Kuomintang	116,805	51.47
Shih Hsi-hsun	Independent	88,903	39.17
謝報	Independent	21,245	9.36
Total		226,953	100.00
Valid votes		226,953	96.66
Invalid/blank votes		7,852	3.34
Total votes		234,805	100.00
Registered voters/turnout		333,910	70.32

=== Nantou ===
Magistrate of Nantou
Candidate	Party	Votes	%
李國楨	Kuomintang	113,516	100.00
Total		113,516	100.00
Valid votes		113,516	90.88
Invalid/blank votes		11,388	9.12
Total votes		124,904	100.00
Registered voters/turnout		148,701	84.00

=== Yunlin ===
Magistrate of Yunlin
Candidate	Party	Votes	%
吳景徽	Kuomintang	166,233	100.00
Total		166,233	100.00
Valid votes		166,233	89.09
Invalid/blank votes		20,349	10.91
Total votes		186,582	100.00
Registered voters/turnout		248,241	75.16

=== Chiayi ===
Incumbent magistrate Lin Chin-sheng (林金生) was again nominated by the Kuomintang, but was defeated by Li Mao-sung (李茂松) who broke away from the party and ran as an independent.

Magistrate of Chiayi
Candidate	Party	Votes	%
Lin Chin-sheng	Kuomintang	?	?
Li Mao-sung	Independent	?	?
Total		206,282	100.00
Valid votes		206,282	
Invalid votes		6,563	
Total votes		212,845	100.00
Registered voters/turnout		260,427	81.73

=== Tainan ===
Magistrate of Tainan
Candidate	Party	Votes	%
高文瑞	Kuomintang	129,668	57.52
黃千里	Young China Party	95,778	42.48
Total		225,446	100.00
Valid votes		225,446	97.38
Invalid/blank votes		6,063	2.62
Total votes		231,509	100.00
Registered voters/turnout		298,057	77.67

Mayor of Tainan
Candidate	Party	Votes	%
楊請	Kuomintang	47,685	57.94
葉廷珪	Kuomintang	30,191	36.68
邱鴻祥	Independent	4,430	5.38
Total		82,306	100.00
Valid votes		82,306	97.82
Invalid/blank votes		1,838	2.18
Total votes		84,144	100.00
Registered voters/turnout		117,189	71.80

=== Kaohsiung ===
Chen Hsin-an (陳新安) was supported by Tangwai local leader Yu Teng-fa, both defeated in last election, and by local faction, hence was elected unopposed.

Magistrate of Kaohsiung
Candidate	Party	Votes	%
Chen Hsin-an	Kuomintang	152,839	100.00
Total		152,839	100.00
Valid votes		152,839	97.51
Invalid/blank votes		3,902	2.49
Total votes		156,741	100.00
Registered voters/turnout		221,971	70.61

For Kaohsiung City, incumbent mayor Hsieh Cheng-chiang (謝掙強) was re-elected, defeating challenges from other local factions.

Mayor of Kaohsiung
Candidate	Party	Votes	%
Hsieh Cheng-chiang	Kuomintang	70,325	58.39
楊金虎	China Democratic Socialist Party	50,118	41.61
Total		120,443	100.00
Valid votes		120,443	96.24
Invalid/blank votes		4,701	3.76
Total votes		125,144	100.00
Registered voters/turnout		149,493	83.71

=== Pingtung ===
Magistrate of Pingtung
Candidate	Party	Votes	%
林石城	Kuomintang	114,520	100.00
Total		114,520	100.00
Valid votes		114,520	71.43
Invalid/blank votes		45,815	28.57
Total votes		160,335	100.00
Registered voters/turnout		233,512	68.66

=== Hualien ===
Kuomintang candidate Lin Mao-sheng (林茂盛) was elected in Hualien County, succeeding from Democratic Socialist magistrate.

=== Penghu ===
Incumbent magistrate Lee Yu-lin (李玉林) ran for second term, while some on the islands wished to have a local governing the county, instead of a waisheng (mainland Chinese migrant) military personnel. Hsu Cheng-ching (許整景), who was born in Penghu but relocated to Kaohsiung, was considered the potential challenger, and had reluctantly agreed to put his name forward.

The original evaluation by the Kuomintang put the popularity of Lee at around 70%, Hsu at 30%. However, as Hsu started gaining support, the party reversed the prediction, while the military of Penghu decided obstructing Hsu's campaign. Commander of the islands first told Hsu that they were throwing their weight behind Lee, then soldiers stopped campaign team from canvassing citing "martial law", and warned some residents against voting Hsu or risk blocking the ports. In light of the gross interference by the military, Hsu abandoned his election plan and returned to Kaohsiung.

Magistrate of Penghu
Candidate	Party	Votes	%
Lee Yu-lin	Kuomintang	23,164	72.27
Hsu Cheng-ching	Independent	8,889	27.73
Total		32,053	100.00
Valid votes		32,053	98.06
Invalid/blank votes		634	1.94
Total votes		32,687	100.00
Registered voters/turnout		39,222	83.34

=== Miaoli ===
Liu Ting-kuo (劉定國) from the Kuomintang was elected.

Magistrate of Miaoli
Candidate	Party	Votes	%
Liu Ting-kuo	Kuomintang	?	?
劉石郎	Independent	?	?
羅春桂	Independent	?	?
Total		103,624	100.00
Valid votes		103,624	
Invalid votes		2,625	
Total votes		106,249	100.00
Registered voters/turnout		167,690	63.37

=== Taitung ===
Wu Chin-yu, Speaker of Taitung County Council, was nominated by the Kuomintang as the sole candidate of the election.

Magistrate of Taitung
Candidate	Party	Votes	%
吳金玉	Kuomintang	55,712	100.00
Total		55,712	100.00
Valid votes		55,712	91.39
Invalid/blank votes		5,248	8.61
Total votes		60,960	100.00
Registered voters/turnout		67,518	90.29
