= 1936 Taiwanese prefectural elections =

- 12 November 1936

76 (of 152) seats in all prefectural assemblies
- Turnout: 98.97%
Alliance	Taiwanese	Japanese
Seats won	40	36

The prefectural assembly elections (Japanese: 州會議員選舉) were held on 12 November 1936 in Taiwan under Japanese rule. According to the Japanese law, half members of prefectural assembly shall be elected by the members of local assembly and the other half be appointed by the Governor-General (總督). In this time, 76 seats from five prefectural assemblies were open for election. Voting was done by Electoral colleges (EC) form by the 3,600 members of local assemblies. Half of them (1,800) were directly elected in the previous year, the other half were appointed by the prefectural governor (州知事). In this election, the first division of electoral districts were implemented in Taiwan.

== Electoral College size ==
Administrative divisions in Taiwan during Japanese rule

Only around 0.073% of the population were eligible to vote in the election, which includes 743 (or 0.31% of) "Japan Mainlanders" (Japanese: 內地人) on Taiwan and 2,864 (or 0.061% of) "Taiwan Islanders" (Japanese: 本島人; mainly Han Taiwanese).

Electoral district		Cities and districts	Seats	EC size
Taihoku	1st	Taihoku City	7	36
Taihoku	2nd	Kīrun City	3	27
Taihoku	3rd	Bunsan, Kaizan, Kīrun, Shichisei, Shinshō, Tansui	5	397
Taihoku	4th	Giran, Ratō, Suō	3	142
Taihoku	Total		18	602
Shinchiku	1st	Shinchiku City	3	28
Shinchiku	2nd	Chūreki, Daikei, Tōen	3	189
Shinchiku	3rd	Byōritsu, Chikunan, Chikutō, Shinchiku, Taiko	5	374
Shinchiku	Total		11	591
Taichū	1st	Taichū City	3	28
Taichū	2nd	Shōka City	3	28
Taichū	3rd	Daiton, Taikō, Tōsei, Toyohara	3	309
Taichū	4th	Hokuto, Inrin, Shōka	4	342
Taichū	5th	Nantō, Nītaka, Nōkō, Takeyama	3	155
Taichū	Total		16	862
Tainan	1st	Tainan City	4	32
Tainan	2nd	Kagi City	3	28
Tainan	3rd	Niitoyo, Shinka, Sobun	4	339
Tainan	4th	Kagi, Shin'ei, Tōseki	4	323
Tainan	5th	Hokukō, Kobi, Toroku	3	249
Tainan	Total		18	971
Takao	1st	Takao City	3	28
Takao	2nd	Heitō City	3	24
Takao	3rd	Hōzan, Kizan, Okayama	4	280
Takao	4th	Chōshū, Heitō, Kōshun, Tōkō	3	242
Takao	Total		13	581
Total			76	3,607

== Result ==
All 76 seats were elected. The overall turnout was at 98.97%, of which Taiwanese was higher than Japanese. 7 invalid electoral votes were found and 37 did not cast their votes. Amongst the elected prefectural assembly, 36 were Japanese and 40 were Taiwanese. The Governor-General then appointed 76 members, cementing the control of the Japanese in the assembly.

Election result
	Total	Prefectures				
	Total	Taihoku	Shinchiku	Taichū	Tainan	Takao
Valid votes	3,526	593	589	844	964	573
Invalid votes	7	2	0	2	2	1
Total votes	3,570	595	589	846	966	574
Eligible voters	3,607	602	591	862	971	581
Turnout	98.97%	98.84%	99.66%	98.14%	99.49%	98.80%
Elected Japanese	36	12	4	7	8	5
Elected Taiwanese	40	6	7	9	10	8
Appointed Japanese	58	12	9	14	13	10
Appointed Taiwanese	18	6	2	2	5	3
