= Hsin Wen-bing =

Taiwanese politician

Hsin Wen-bing MLY
- 辛文炳

Mayor of Tainan City
- In office 2 June 1960 – 2 June 1964
- Preceded by: Yeh Ting-kuei
- Succeeded by: Yeh Ting-kuei

Member of the Legislative Yuan
- In office 1 February 1973 – 31 January 1981
- Constituency: Taiwan 4th Yunlin County, Chiayi County, Tainan County, Tainan City

Personal details
- Born: 1 February 1912 Tainan Chō, Taiwan, Empire of Japan
- Died: 20 March 1999 (aged 87)
- Relations: Hsin Yung-ching (sister)
- Parent: Hsin Hsi-huai (father)
- Education: Meiji University

Hsin Wen-bing (1 February 1912 – 20 March 1999) was a Taiwanese politician who served as mayor of Tainan from 1960 to 1964, and a member of the Legislative Yuan between 1973 and 1981. Hsin retired in 1988. He died on 20 March 1999 aged 87.
