= 1939 Taiwanese local elections =

- 22 November 1939
- Turnout: 96.74%

1939 Taiwanese local elections were held on 22 November 1939, electing half of the city and township councillors for the second time under Japanese rule. The other half were appointed by the prefectural governors.

After the authorities highlighting the solemnity and idealness of an election under the current situation, the cities banned door-to-door election campaign and advocated using less publications to reduce waste. The number of eligible voters on the island increased around 60% to 326,229. Although more seats were opened for election comparing with the last time, there were less candidates. All Japanese mainlanders were elected in Shoka (now Changhua), Tainan, Takao (now Kaohsiung) and Heito (now Pingtung). With 315,580 casting the votes, the turnout was over 90% in all regions, slightly higher than the last election.

The 1943 election was cancelled due to World War II, hence the tenure of the elected councillors were extended until the surrender of Japan in 1945.
