= List of county magistrates of Miaoli =

The magistrate of Miaoli is the chief executive of the government of Miaoli County. This list includes directly elected magistrates of the county. The incumbent Magistrate is independent Chung Tung-chin since 25 December 2022.

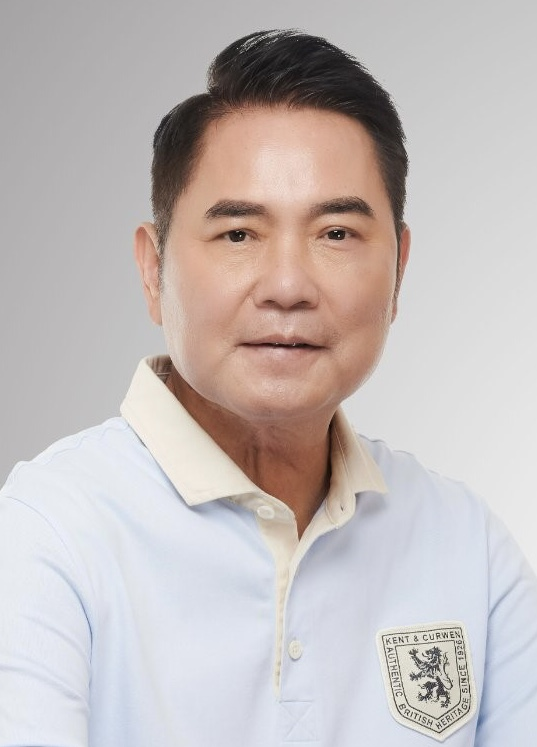
Incumbent Magistrate, Chung Tung-chin

== Directly elected County Magistrates ==
Kuomintang Independent

| № | Portrait | Name (Birth–Death) | Term of Office | | Term | Political Party |
|---|---|---|---|---|---|---|
| 1 | | Lai Shun-sheng 賴順生; Lài Shùnshēng (1908-1992) | 15 August 1951 | 16 August 1954 | 1 | Kuomintang |
| 2 | | Liu Ting-kuo 劉定國; Liú Dìngguó (1913-1997) | 16 August 1954 | 2 June 1957 | 2 | Kuomintang |
| 2 | | Liu Ting-kuo 劉定國; Liú Dìngguó (1913-1997) | 2 June 1957 | 2 June 1960 | 3 | Kuomintang |
| 3 | | Lin Wei-kung 林為恭; Lín Wéigōng (1908-1982) | 2 June 1960 | 2 June 1964 | 4 | Kuomintang |
| 3 | | Lin Wei-kung 林為恭; Lín Wéigōng (1908-1982) | 2 June 1964 | 2 June 1968 | 5 | Kuomintang |
| 4 | | Huang Wen-fa 黃文發; Huáng Wénfā (1906-1986) | 2 June 1968 | 1 February 1973 | 6 | Kuomintang |
| 5 | | Chiu Wen-kuang 邱文光; Qiū Wénguāng (1928-1990) | 1 February 1973 | 20 December 1977 | 7 | Kuomintang |
| 5 | | Chiu Wen-kuang 邱文光; Qiū Wénguāng (1928-1990) | 20 December 1977 | 20 December 1981 | 8 | Kuomintang |
| 6 | | Hsieh Chin-ting 謝金汀; Xiè Jīntīng (1936-2017) | 20 December 1981 | 30 May 1985 | 9 | Kuomintang |
| 6 | | Hsieh Chin-ting 謝金汀; Xiè Jīntīng (1936-2017) | 20 December 1985 | 20 December 1989 | 10 | Kuomintang |
| 7 | | Chang Chiu-hua 張秋華; Zhāng Qiūhuá (1937-2020) | 20 December 1989 | 20 December 1993 | 11 | Kuomintang |
| 8 | | Ho Chih-hui 何智輝; Hé Zhìhuī (1950-) | 20 December 1993 | 20 December 1997 | 12 | Independent |
| | | Ho Chih-hui 何智輝; Hé Zhìhuī (1950-) | 20 December 1993 | 20 December 1997 | 12 | Kuomintang |
| 9 | | Fu Hsueh-peng 傅學鵬; Fù Xuépéng (1951-) | 20 December 1997 | 20 December 2001 | 13 | Independent |
| 9 | | Fu Hsueh-peng 傅學鵬; Fù Xuépéng (1951-) | 20 December 2001 | 20 December 2005 | 14 | Independent |
| 10 | | Liu Cheng-hung 劉政鴻; Liú Zhènghóng (1947-) | 20 December 2005 | 20 December 2009 | 15 | Kuomintang |
| 10 | | Liu Cheng-hung 劉政鴻; Liú Zhènghóng (1947-) | 20 December 2009 | 25 December 2014 | 16 | Kuomintang |
| 11 | | Hsu Yao-chang 徐耀昌; Xú Yàochāng (1955-) | 25 December 2014 | 25 December 2018 | 17 | Kuomintang |
| 11 | | Hsu Yao-chang 徐耀昌; Xú Yàochāng (1955-) | 25 December 2018 | 25 December 2022 | 18 | Kuomintang |
| 12 | | Chung Tung-chin 鍾東錦; Zhōng Dōngjǐn (1963-) | 25 December 2022 | Incumbent | 19 | Independent |

== See also ==
- Miaoli County Government
