= Chen Chi-chuan =

Taiwanese politician and businessman

- 陳啟川
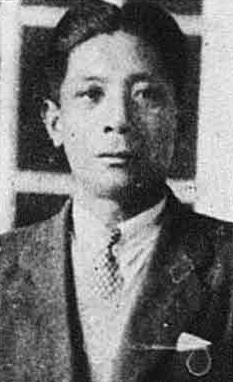

Mayor of Kaohsiung
- In office June 2, 1960 – June 2, 1968
- Preceded by: Chen Wu-chang
- Succeeded by: Yang Chin-hu

Personal details
- Born: June 6, 1898 Fengshan, Takao, Taiwan, Empire of Japan
- Died: May 11, 1993 (aged 94) Kaohsiung, Taiwan
- Party: Kuomintang
- Relations: Chen Chung-he (father)
- Education: Keio University; University of Hong Kong
- Profession: Politician

Chen Chi-chuan -- Frank C. Chen (Chinese: 陳啟川; Pe̍h-ōe-jī: Tân Khé-chhoan; June 6, 1898 – May 11, 1993), also known as Tan Khe-chhoan, was a member of the "Chen family from Kaohsiung". He was a Taiwanese politician and businessman who served as the mayor of Kaohsiung between 1960 and 1968, and the co-founder and chair of Kaohsiung Medical College. Chen is a son of Chen Chung-he (陳中和), a sugar industrialist in the Japanese-ruled Taiwan.

Today, the Chen Chi Chuan (Frank C. Chen) Cultural Foundation promotes both the legacy of the former mayor and cultural events and resources for the citizens of Kaohsiung, a city that's been home to the Chen family for over 300 years. In 2021, the Frank C. Chen Foundation sponsored "Formosa Files," a podcast about the history of Taiwan hosted by longtime Taiwan residents John G. Ross and Eryk Michael Smith.

== See also ==
- Tu Tsung-ming

Government offices
| Preceded by Chen Wu-chang | Mayor of Kaohsiung; 1960–1968 | Succeeded by Yang Chin-hu |
