= Yangmingshan Administrative Bureau =

County level administrative body (1949- 1973)

Yangmingshan Administrative Bureau 陽明山管理局
- Administrative Bureau of the Taiwan
- 1949–1973
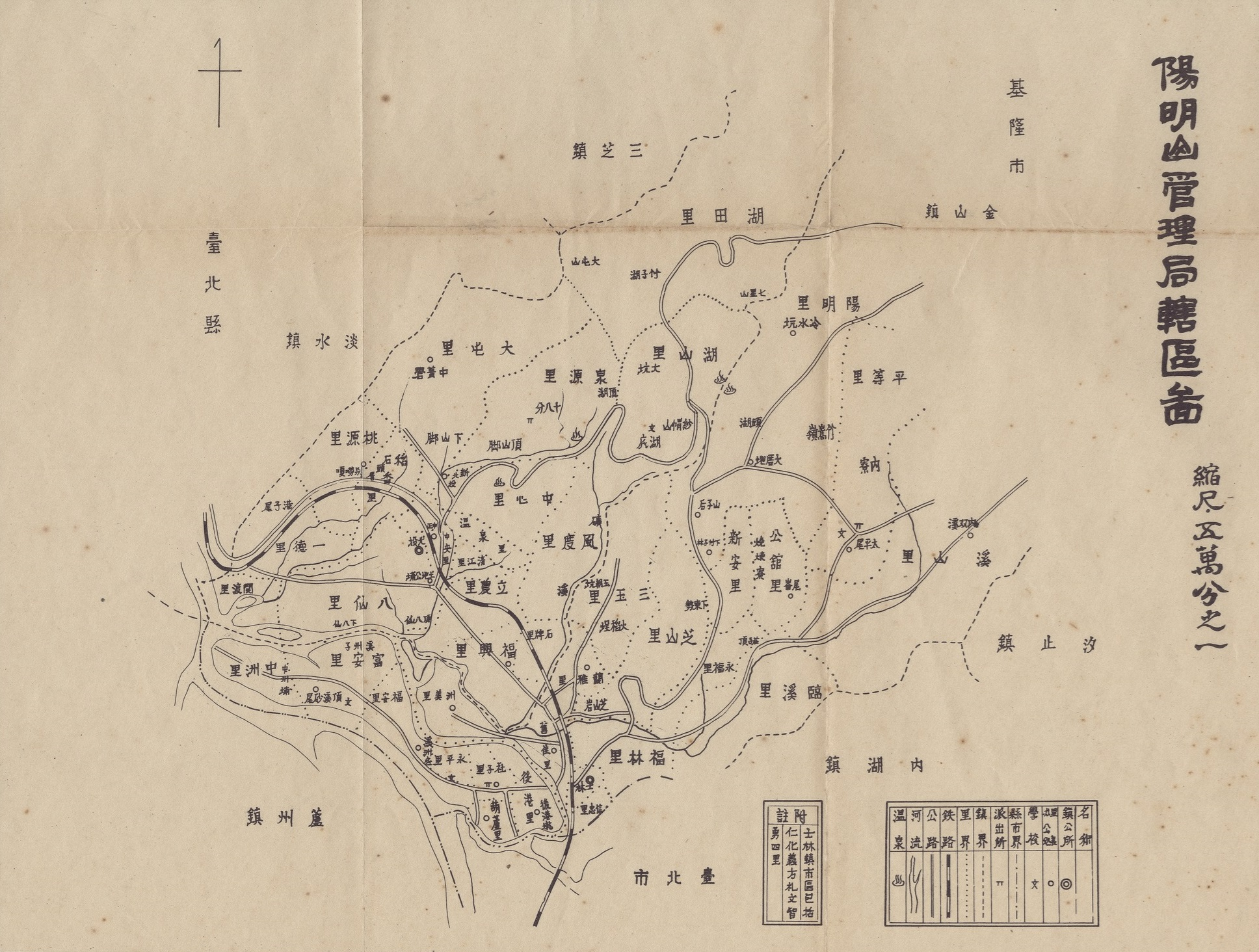
- Capital: Peitou Township
- Area
  - 1966: 119.01 km^{2} (45.95 sq mi)
- Population
  - 1966: 158,559
- History
  - Established: 26 August 1949
  - Disestablished: 31 December 1973
- Political subdivisions: 2 Urban townships
Preceded by	Succeeded by
Taipei County	Taipei
- Today part of: Beitou District, Taipei; Shilin District, Taipei

Yangmingshan Administrative Bureau (Chinese: 陽明山管理局; Pe̍h-ōe-jī: Iûⁿ-bêng-soaⁿ Koán-lí-kio̍k) was a county level administrative body in Republic of China's Taiwan Province between 1949 and 1973.

== History ==
The territory of the Yangmingshan Administrative Bureau was administered by Shirin Town (士林街) and Hokutō Town (北投街) under Shichisei District (七星郡) of Taihoku Prefecture (臺北州). It is famous for the hot springs (Onsen) from the Tatun Volcanic Group. After the Chinese Civil War, the Kuomintang led Government of the Republic of China relocated to Taiwan. The President Chiang Kai-shek settled his residence in this region. This region was then made a special zone to protect the leadership of the country.

- 26 August 1949, Tsaoshan Administrative Bureau (草山管理局) was established by Taiwan Provincial Government. Its territory covers Shihlin Township and Peitou Township under Taipei County.
- 31 March 1950, Tsaoshan was renamed Yangmingshan. The bureau was also renamed accordingly.
- 1 July 1968, the bureau transferred from Taiwan Province to the newly established special municipality — Taipei City. It still remained as a county level division, the two townships were reformed as Districts.
- 1 January 1974, Taipei City Government took over the administrative power of the bureau. Shilin District and Beitou District are directly led by the city government. The bureau remained as the first level department under the Taipei City Government, but it only administered environmental maintenance and tourism only.
- 1 January 1977, The bureau was downgraded to Yangmingshan Administrative Office (陽明山管理處), a second level office under the Department of Civil Affairs, Taipei City Government (臺北市政府民政局).
- 1 January 1980, Yangmingshan Administrative Office was downgraded to Yangmingshan Park Administrative Establishment (陽明山公園管理所), a third level office under the Parks and Street Lights Office, Public Works Department, Taipei City Government (臺北市政府工務局公園路燈工程管理處).

== Administration ==
Magistrate of the Yangmingshan Administrative Bureau was appointed by the defunct Taiwan Provincial Government. The former Taipei County Council, whose power was transferred to the Provisional Taipei City Council after 1968, oversaw the Bureau, while its budget was allocated by the provincial government.

== Hierarchy ==
Time		Before 1945	Oct 1945 – Feb 1947	Feb 1947 - Aug 1949	Aug 1949 – Jun 1968	1 Jul 1968 – 31 Dec 1973	1 Jan 1974 – present
Hierarchy	1st	Taihoku Prefecture	Taiwan Province			Taipei City	Taipei City
Hierarchy	2nd	Taihoku Prefecture	Taipei County		Ts'aoshan Administrative Bureau /Yangmingshan Administrative Bureau		Taipei City
Hierarchy	3rd	Shichisei District	Ch'ihsing District (七星區)	Tanshui District (淡水區)	Ts'aoshan Administrative Bureau /Yangmingshan Administrative Bureau		Taipei City
Hierarchy	4th	Shirin Town; Hokutō Town	Shihlin Township; Peitou Township			Shilin District; Beitou District	

== Landmarks ==
- Grass Mountain Chateau — Residence of Chiang Kai-shek, former President of the Republic of China, from December 1949 to 1950, then used as summer residence
- Shilin Official Residence — Residence of Chiang Kai-shek from 1950 to 1975
- Zhongxing Guesthouse — Guesthouse of Chiang Kai-shek
- Chung-Shan Building — Meeting place of the defunct National Assembly

== See also ==
- Shilin District
- Beitou District
- Yangmingshan
- Bo'ai Special Zone
- Taipei
