= Lie Kuen-cheng =

Taiwanese politician

Lie Kuen-cheng or Lai Kun-cheng (Chinese: 賴坤成; born 3 June 1964) is a Taiwanese politician, and a member of the Democratic Progressive Party (DPP). In addition, he was formerly a legislator, a representative of the National Assembly, and the mayor of Taitung City. He is a lawyer by training. He also presided over the first township and city in Taitung County to have a member of the DPP as its representative, as well as being chairman and the first Taitung County legislator from the DPP.

== Early life ==
Lie Kuen-cheng's father, Lie Chun-tsai (賴春在), was a graduate of the first class of the Institute of Revolutionary Practice and the former director of the public service station of seven townships in Taitung County. Due to changes in his father's working environment, he attended five schools as a child. When he was ten years old, his father died, and his family moved to Taipei. He is the only son in his family, with three sisters, and was raised by his mother.

In his junior year of high school, he became quite rebellious, leading to difficulties for his mother in managing him. This led to him dropping out of several schools, including Chiang Kai-shek High School, Jianzhong Night School, Banzhong, Qiangshu Night School, and Jianzhong Day School. His mother then sent him back to Taitung to be disciplined by his uncle, who was the Taitung County chairman at the time. One of his high school instructors suggested he join the Kuomintang, but he refused. Later, in his third year, he and his classmates began collecting Tangwai magazines, which changed his outlook. He was eventually admitted to National Taiwan University Law School.

According to Lie, he spent four years at National Taiwan University "messing around", particularly in his junior year, often skipping classes for hiking and photography – sometimes for up to a week. When he graduated, he did not have to join the military as he did not meet the height requirement. He then worked as a commentator in Yushan National Park for a year. Later, he attended a cram school in northern Taiwan to prepare for the bar exam, and after a year of dedicated study, he passed the bar.

After obtaining his law license, Lie considered starting a business. However, a high school friend who was an assistant to Chen Shui-bian invited him to become a legislative aide. After meeting with Chen Shui-bian, he began working in the Legislative Yuan's DPP caucus, which was in need of support. From March 1990 to October 1991, he served as the chief assistant of the DPP's Legislative Yuan caucus.

== Political career ==
After a vote-rigging incident broke out in Hualien County in the 1992 legislative election, some members of the DPP went to the central election meeting in person and demanded that Huang Hsin-chieh be announced as the winner in accordance with administrative discretion. However, they were dissatisfied with the reception of Hsu Kui-lin (許桂霖), secretary-general of the Central Election Commission. It was then recommended for Lie to go to Wu Po-hsiung, the Minister of the Interior who was also the chairman of the Central Election Commission. As a result, Lie was dragged into the elevator and to the Central Joint Office upside down. There was fighting afterward on the streets. Lie had to stay in the National Taiwan University Hospital for a week after this incident which Police Commissioner Chuang Heng-dai personally apologized for, specifically for the poor usage of the Guard's powers.

He originally wanted to work as a lawyer a few years before running for office. However, it coincided with the election of the Second National Assembly. In addition, the Legislative Yuan caucus withdrew from the budget review and legislators Lu Hsiu-yi and Tai Chen-yao were beaten. At that time, the Legislative Yuan caucus held a national election. Lie Kuen-cheng gave a speech in Taitung and was encouraged by party bosses to run in the election. At that time, Lie was hesitant to run in Taitung as it was quite unlikely for a DPP member to win in an election against the dominant Kuomintang, as Taitung having a representative that wasn't a member of the Kuomintang was rare, the last person being Huang Shun-hsing. In the end, he was persuaded by local elders telling him that Taipei is not short of a lawyer, and that Taitung would benefit from his presence. After being endorsed, he returned to Taitung to run for office. In 1992, he was elected as a representative of the Second National Congress for a term until May 1996.

In March 1998, Lie Kuen-cheng was elected mayor of Taitung City, Taitung County, becoming the youngest township mayor in Taiwan at the time and the first DPP mayor in Taitung County. In 2001, he ran for Taitung County magistrate on behalf of the DPP but was not elected. After being re-elected to the mayoralty in January 2002, he abolished the old Taitung station route.

In 2005, Wu Chun-li was elected to the 15th term of the Taitung County Magistrate but was dismissed on the day he took office due to corruption. Because the DPP weren't nominated, both Lie Kuen-cheng and Liu Chao-hao ran for the county magistrate by-election as non-party members, and both lost due to the split in the DPP.

On 15 October 2009, Justin Huang, the former Taitung County constituency legislator, announced his resignation as a legislator due to his participation in the county magistrate election at the end of the year. On 28 October, the Central Executive Committee of the DPP approved the nomination of Lie Kuen-cheng to run for the Legislative Council by-election. On 9 January 2010, Lie Kuen-cheng defeated the Kuomintang's former county magistrate Kuang Li-chen's 21,215 by 1975 votes, becoming the first DPP legislator in the history of Taitung County.

In 2012, Lie Kuen-cheng and Liu Chao-hao failed in their re-election bid to the Taitung County constituency. They ran in the Hualien County constituency, losing to Wang Ting-son. In June 2014, he was recalled by the DPP to run for the Taitung City mayoral election at the end of the year. He lost to then-county councilor Chang Kuo-chou (張國洲), who was nominated by the Kuomintang by a narrow margin of 681 votes. In 2015, Lie once again participated in the DPP's Taitung legislative primary election. Although he was supported by the forces of County Magistrate Justin Huang, he was defeated again by then-legislator Liu Chao-hao. He was not able to again be a candidate in an election there so again ran in the Hualien County elections working hard to fight for change. Legislator Hsiao Bi-khim, from the same party in the region, was assisted in the election.

In 2022, Lie Kuen-cheng unsuccessfully tried to run for Taitung County magistrate on behalf of the DPP. The following year, he defeated Liu Chao-hao in the party's primary election and represented the DPP in the 2024 Taitung legislative election, but failed to be elected.

== Controversial remarks ==
On 7 October 2011, after the incident of female firefighter Lai Wen-li being hit and amputated by a drunk driver while on duty on 1 October, Lie Kuen-cheng questioned the Minister of the Interior at the Internal Affairs Committee of the Legislative Yuan, saying the ratio of female firefighters was too high, "Special jobs like the police have to go up and down, and send so many girls at once, and every one of them is very delicate." He also said, "They are asked to catch snakes, and they will be afraid of snakes when they see them dead." Lie's statement was denounced as sexist by women's groups and members on both sides of the Legislative Yuan.
