= Qingling =

Qingling or Ching-ling may refer to:

== People ==
- Han Qingling (王庆铃; born 1993), Chinese heptathlete and pentathlete
- Soong Ching-ling (宋庆龄, 1893–1981), Chinese politician
- Song Qingling (field hockey) (宋清龄, born 1986), Chinese field hockey player
- Wang Qingling (王庆铃, born 1993), Chinese heptathlete
- Yao Ching-ling (饒慶鈴), Taiwanese political scientist

== Other ==
- Qingling Motors (庆铃汽车), Chinese automotive and commercial vehicle manufacturer
- Qingling Subdistrict, subdistrict of Hongshan District, Wuhan, Hubei Province, China

== See also ==
- Qingling Taga, motor vehicle
- Qinling (disambiguation)
