= 2018 Taiwanese local elections =

- 24 November 2018

22 magistrates/mayors and others (Note: 912 councillors; 204 township/city mayors and indigenous district chief administrators; 2,149 township/city council representatives; 7,760 village chiefs; Figures in this infobox are for magistrate/mayor elections unless otherwise noted. Special municipalities are counted with counties/cities despite being counted separately in official statistics)
- Registered: 19,102,502
- Turnout: 66.11% ▼0.20 pp (Note: Special municipalities; turnout for counties and cities was 68.87%.)
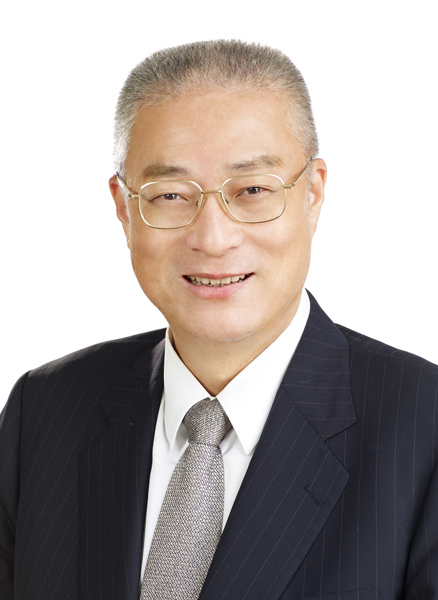

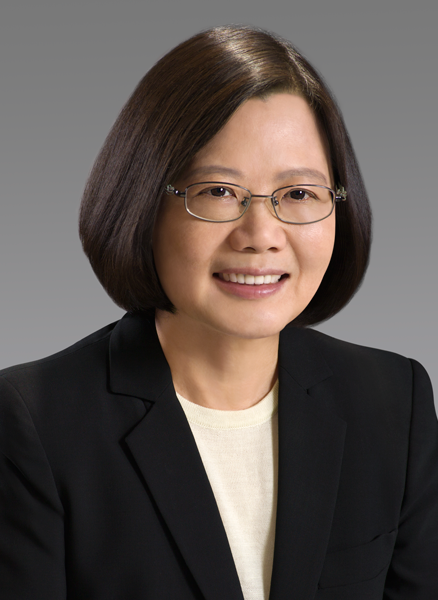
	First party	Second party
Leader	Wu Den-yih	Tsai Ing-wen
Party	KMT	DPP
Leader since	20 August 2017	28 May 2014
Last election	6 seats, 40.81%	13 seats, 47.97%
Seats won	15	6
Seat change	▲9	▼7
Popular vote	4,182,875 (Note: Special municipalities; vote count for counties and cities was 1,919,531.)	3,399,976 (Note: Special municipalities; vote count for counties and cities was 1,497,455.)
Percentage	48.79% (Note: Special municipalities; percentage for counties and cities was 48.80%.)	39.66% (Note: Special municipalities; percentage for counties and cities was 38.07%.)
Swing	▲7.98 pp	▼8.31 pp
Special municipality councillors	175	137
County/city councillors	219	101
Township/city mayors	80	40
- KMT hold DPP hold IND hold KMT gain DPP gain IND gain

Local elections were held on 24 November 2018 in Taiwan, to elect county magistrates (city mayors), county (city) councilors, township mayors, township councilors and chiefs of village (borough) in 6 municipalities and 16 counties (cities). Elected officials would serve a four-year term. Polling stations were open from 08:00 to 16:00 on the election day.

The elections resulted in a substantial defeat for the DPP. The DPP previously held 13 of 22 municipalities and counties, but won only 6 in this election due to widespread public distrust, a de facto vote of no confidence on President Tsai's Administration, both politically (relations with China), economically (agriculture, tourism), and socially (pollution, labor laws, wages), which were reflected in the series of referendum results. The KMT won back executive control of 7 municipalities and counties from the DPP, while Ko Wen-je (independent) won his re-election for Taipei mayor.

== Background ==
This local election was seen as the first test for the incumbent President Tsai Ing-wen since assuming office in May 2016. The Central Election Commission opened election registration to candidates on 27 August 2018.

The Democratic Progressive Party has won the popular vote against the Kuomintang in all of the last three elections. This trend has continued in the 2016 elections, where the Democratic Progressive Party won a majority in the Legislative Yuan with 68 seats and the presidency.

== Results summary ==
Elected magistrates/mayors and council composition in the 2018 Taiwanese local election
Subdivision	Magistrate/mayor		Council				
Subdivision	Party result	Elect	First party	Seats (Note: Bold figures indicate majority)	Second party	Seats	Total seats
New Taipei City	Kuomintang hold	Hou You-yi	Kuomintang	33 ▲7	DPP	25 ▼7	66
Taipei City	Independent hold	Ko Wen-je	Kuomintang	29 ▲1	DPP	19 ▼8	63
Taoyuan City	DPP hold	Cheng Wen-tsan	Kuomintang	32 ▲3	DPP	18 ▼2	63
Taichung City	Kuomintang gain from DPP	Lu Shiow-yen	Kuomintang	32 ▲4	DPP	25 ▼2	65
Tainan City	DPP hold	Huang Wei-cher	DPP	25 ▼3	Kuomintang	16	57
Kaohsiung City	Kuomintang gain from DPP	Han Kuo-yu	Kuomintang	33 ▲9	DPP	25 ▼8	66
Yilan County	Kuomintang gain from DPP	Lin Zi-miao	Kuomintang	13 ▲2	DPP	8 ▼4	34
Hsinchu County	Kuomintang hold	Yang Wen-ke	Kuomintang	19 ▼2	DPP	2	36
Miaoli County	Kuomintang hold	Hsu Yao-chang	Kuomintang	14 ▼5	DPP	4	38
Changhua County	Kuomintang gain from DPP	Wang Huei-mei	Kuomintang	28 ▲4	DPP	12 ▼5	54
Nantou County	Kuomintang hold	Lin Ming-chen	Kuomintang	17	DPP	8	37
Yunlin County	Kuomintang gain from DPP	Chang Li-shan	DPP	12 ▼1	Kuomintang	7	43
Chiayi County	DPP hold	Weng Chang-liang	DPP	17 ▼1	Kuomintang	9	37
Pingtung County	DPP hold	Pan Men-an	Kuomintang	17 ▼2	DPP	15 ▼3	55
Taitung County	Kuomintang hold	Yao Ching-ling	Kuomintang	21 ▼1	DPP (Note: Tied with PFP)	1	30
Hualien County	Kuomintang gain from independent	Hsu Chen-wei	Kuomintang	18 ▼2	DPP	3 ▼3	33
Penghu County	Kuomintang gain from DPP	Lai Feng-wei	Kuomintang	4 ▼4	DPP	3 ▲1	19
Keelung City	DPP hold	Lin Yu-chang	Kuomintang	16 ▲2	DPP	6 ▼4	31
Hsinchu City	DPP hold	Lin Chih-chien	Kuomintang	15	DPP	6 ▼1	34
Chiayi City	Kuomintang gain from DPP	Huang Min-hui	Kuomintang	5 ▼1	DPP	4 ▼1	23
Kinmen County	Kuomintang gain from independent	Yang Cheng-wu	Kuomintang	9 ▼6	For Public Good Party	1 ▲1	19
Lienchiang County	Kuomintang hold	Liu Cheng-ying	Kuomintang	7 ▲1	None	—N/a	9

== Magistrate and mayor elections ==
=== Opinion polls ===
2018 Taiwan magistrate/mayor elections nationwide opinion poll
Poll organization	Date completed	KMT	DPP	Others	Ind
TPOF	2018-11-08	33.9%	24.2%	－	14.9%
Trend Survey	2018-11-06	36.4%	25.9%	0.8%	15.2%
Taiwan Brain Trust	2018-07-28	29.5%	38.6%	0.4%	10.5%

=== Results ===
Subdivision	Electorate	Turnout (%)	Winner			Runner-up			Map
Subdivision	Electorate	Turnout (%)	Name	Votes	%	Name	Votes	%	Map
New Taipei City	3,264,128	62.46	Hou You-yi	1,165,130	57.15	Su Tseng-chang	873,692	42.85	
Taipei City	2,164,155	65.37	Ko Wen-je	580,820	41.05	Ting Shou-chung	577,566	40.82	
Taoyuan City	1,732,591	59.63	Cheng Wen-tsan	552,330	53.46	Apollo Chen	407,234	39.42	
Taichung City	2,213,789	66.12	Lu Shiow-yen	827,996	56.57	Lin Chia-lung	619,855	42.35	
Tainan City	1,546,862	62.49	Huang Wei-cher	367,518	38.02	Kao Su-po	312,874	32.37	
Kaohsiung City	2,281,338	72.63	Han Kuo-yu	892,545	53.87	Chen Chi-mai	742,239	44.80	
Yilan County	373,510	66.97	Lin Zi-miao	123,767	49.48	Chen Ou-po	95,609	38.23	
Hsinchu County	427,652	66.03	Yang Wen-ke	107,877	38.20	Hsu Hsin-ying	91,190	32.29	
Miaoli County	446,507	68.17	Hsu Yao-chang	175,756	57.74	Hsu Ting-zhen	112,704	37.03	
Changhua County	1,031,222	68.89	Wang Huei-mei	377,795	53.18	Wei Ming-ku	283,269	39.87	
Nantou County	413,222	70.87	Lin Ming-chen	195,385	66.72	Hung Kuo-hao	97,460	33.28	
Yunlin County	565,078	69.29	Chang Li-shan	210,770	53.82	Lee Chin-yung	163,325	41.72	
Chiayi County	428,649	66.52	Weng Chang-liang	145,288	50.95	Wu Yu-jen	84,243	29.54	
Pingtung County	689,393	68.20	Pan Men-an	262,809	55.90	Su Ching-chuan	197,518	42.01	
Taitung County	179,706	66.51	Rao Ching-ling	70,577	59.05	Liu Chao-hao	44,264	37.04	
Hualien County	268,817	63.09	Hsu Chen-wei	121,297	71.52	Liu Siao-Mei	43,879	25.87	
Penghu County	86,603	61.10	Lai Feng-wei	20,570	38.87	Chen Kuang-fu	17,347	32.78	
Keelung City	309,428	60.98	Lin Yu-chang	102,167	54.14	Hsieh Li-kung	86,529	45.86	
Hsinchu City	338,323	64.17	Lin Chih-chien	107,612	49.57	Hsu Ming-tsai	60,508	27.87	
Chiayi City	212,843	66.81	Huang Min-hui	58,558	41.18	Twu Shiing-jer	56,256	39.56	
Kinmen County	117,913	41.75	Yang Cheng-wu	23,520	47.48	Chen Fu-hai	22,719	46.15	
Lienchiang County	10,773	68.76	Liu Cheng-ying	4,861	65.62	Chu Hsiu-chen	1,284	17.33	

== Councillor elections ==
=== Nominations ===
Province	County	Members	KMT	DPP	TSU	PFP	NP	New Power Party	IND/Other
Special municipality		Members	KMT	DPP	TSU	PFP	NP	New Power Party	IND/Other
Taipei		63	33	27	1	4	7	5	48
New Taipei		66	36	36			3	6	41
Taoyuan		63	38	34		3		2	53
Taichung		65	37	36		3		4	51
Tainan		57	22	37	2	1		1	49
Kaohsiung		66	37	38	3	3		3	48
Taiwan Province
Taiwan Province	Keelung	31	19	15		6		1	19
Taiwan Province	Yilan County	34	16	18		1		3	36
Taiwan Province	Hsinchu	34	20	12		1		4	36
Taiwan Province	Hsinchu County	36	27	7				1	49
Taiwan Province	Miaoli County	38	18	10				2	42
Taiwan Province	Changhua County	54	29	26				1	32
Taiwan Province	Nantou County	37	20	13					29
Taiwan Province	Yunlin County	43	10	20	1			2	42
Taiwan Province	Chiayi	23	8	8	2			1	24
Taiwan Province	Chiayi County	37	9	22					30
Taiwan Province	Hualien County	33	33	9				2	25
Taiwan Province	Taitung County	30	29	4		2		2	30
Taiwan Province	Pingtung County	55	32	30	1				43
Taiwan Province	Penghu County	19	4	4				1	30
Fujian Province	Kinmen County	19	10	1		2			22
Fujian Province	Lienchiang County	9	10						3
Total		912	497	407	10	26	10	41	777

==== Opinion polls ====
2018 Municipal Councillor & County Councillor Nationwide Polls
Poll source	Date of completion	Kuomintang	Democratic Progressive Party	Others	Independent	Lead
Taiwan Think Tank	April 1, 2018	28.5%	33.6%	－	4.9%	5.1%
Taiwan Brain Trust	July 28, 2018	29.9%	22.9%	－	3.6%	7%
New Power Party	September 5, 2018	25.2%	23.6%	12.1%	－	1.6%
Taipei
China Times	June 4, 2018	39.4%	16.6%	－	－	22.8%
Trends	July 16, 2018	27.1%	14.1%	7.1%	3.9%	13%
CM Media	July 26, 2018	35%	16.2%	12.7%	－	18.8%
Formosa	October 12, 2018	28.5%	16.3%	5.6%	－	12.2%
Taichung
CM Media	July 31, 2018	27.7%	21.3%	16%	－	6.4%
Kaohsiung
CM Media	September 18, 2018	27.5%	24.1%	17.3%	－	3.4%
Hsinchu City
Taiwan Green Party	August 24, 2018	27.3%	12.2%	10.2%	－	15.1%
Changhua County
CM Media	October 16, 2018	32.5%	17.8%	14.9%	－	14.7%
Chiayi City
CM Media	September 5, 2018	25%	24.7%	16.8%	－	0.3%
Yilan County
CM Media	September 26, 2018	27%	20.5%	15.3%	－	7.5%

==== Results ====
Province	County	Members	KMT	DPP	TSU	PFP	NP	New Power Party	IND/Other
Special municipality		Members	KMT	DPP	TSU	PFP	NP	New Power Party	IND/Other
Taipei		63	29	19		2	2	3	8
New Taipei		66	33	25					8
Taoyuan		63	32	18				1	12
Taichung		65	32	25		1			7
Tainan		57	16	25	1			1	14
Kaohsiung		66	33	25	1	1		2	4
County and Non-Municipal
County and Non-Municipal	Keelung	31	16	6		2		1	6
County and Non-Municipal	Yilan County	34	13	8		1			12
County and Non-Municipal	Hsinchu	34	15	6				3	10
County and Non-Municipal	Hsinchu County	36	19	2				1	14
County and Non-Municipal	Miaoli County	38	14	4				2	18
County and Non-Municipal	Changhua County	54	28	12				1	13
County and Non-Municipal	Nantou County	37	17	8					12
County and Non-Municipal	Yunlin County	43	7	12	1			1	22
County and Non-Municipal	Chiayi	23	5	4	1			0	13
County and Non-Municipal	Chiayi County	37	9	17					11
County and Non-Municipal	Hualien County	33	18	3					12
County and Non-Municipal	Taitung County	30	21	1		1			7
County and Non-Municipal	Pingtung County	55	17	15	1				22
County and Non-Municipal	Penghu County	19	4	3					12
Offshore	Kinmen County	19	9						10
Offshore	Lienchiang County	9	7						2
Total		912	394	238	5	8	2	16	249

Speaker/Deputy Speaker election
Special municipality		Speaker (Party)	Deputy Speaker (Party)
Province	County	Speaker (Party)	Deputy Speaker (Party)
Taipei		Chen Chin-hsiang (Kuomintang)	Yeh Lin-chuang (Kuomintang)
New Taipei		Chiang Ken-huang (Kuomintang)	Chen Hung-yuan (Kuomintang)
Taoyuan		Ciou Yi-sheng (Kuomintang)	Li Hsiao-chung (Kuomintang)
Taichung		Chang Ching-chao (Kuomintang)	Yen Li-ming (Kuomintang)
Tainan		Kuo Hsin-liang (Independent)	Lin Ping-li (Independent)
Kaohsiung		Hsu Kun-yuan (Kuomintang)	Liu Shu-mei (Kuomintang)
Taiwan Province	Keelung	Tsai Wang-lien (Kuomintang)	Jonathan Lin (Kuomintang)
Taiwan Province	Yilan	Huang Ting-ho (Kuomintang)	Chen Han-chung (Independent)
Taiwan Province	Hsinchu County	Chang Chen-rong (Kuomintang)	Wang Ping-han (Kuomintang)
Taiwan Province	Hsinchu City	Hsu Hsiu-jui (Kuomintang)	Yu Pang-yen (Kuomintang)
Taiwan Province	Miaoli	Chung Tung-chin (Kuomintang)	Lee Wen-ping (Kuomintang)
Taiwan Province	Changhua	Hsieh Dien-lin (Kuomintang)	Hsu Yuan-luan (Kuomintang)
Taiwan Province	Nantou	He Sheng-feng (Kuomintang)	Pan Yi-chuan (Kuomintang)
Taiwan Province	Yunlin	Shen Chung-lung (Kuomintang)	Su Chun-hao (DPP)
Taiwan Province	Chiayi County	Chang Ming-ta (DPP)	Chen Yu-yueh (DPP)
Taiwan Province	Chiayi City	Chuang Feng-an (Independent)	Su Tse-feng (Independent)
Taiwan Province	Pingtung	Chou Tien-lun (Kuomintang)	Lu Wen-jui (Kuomintang)
Taiwan Province	Taitung	Wu Hsiu-hua (Kuomintang)	Lin Tsung-han (Kuomintang)
Taiwan Province	Hualien	Chang Chun (Kuomintang)	Pan Yueh-hsia (Kuomintang)
Taiwan Province	Penghu	Liu Chen Zhao-ling (Kuomintang)	Chen Shuang-chuan (Kuomintang)
Fuchien Province	Kinmen	Hung Yun-tien (Kuomintang)	Chou Tzu-chieh (Independent)
Fuchien Province	Lienchiang	Chang Yung-chiang (Kuomintang)	Chou Jui-kuo (Kuomintang)

== Township/city mayor elections ==
2018 Republic of China Township Head Results: Kuomintang Democratic Progressive Party Independent

=== Nominations ===
Province	County	Members	Kuomintang	Democratic Progressive Party	Free Taiwan Party	Others	Independent
Special municipality （Mountain indigenous District）		Members	Kuomintang	Democratic Progressive Party	Free Taiwan Party	Others	Independent
Taiwan Province	Yilan County	12	11	10			11
Taiwan Province	Hsinchu County	13	14	1			22
Taiwan Province	Miaoli County	18	13	2			29
Taiwan Province	Changhua County	26	19	19			44
Taiwan Province	Nantou County	13	13	6			19
Taiwan Province	Yunlin County	20	5	18			32
Taiwan Province	Chiayi County	18	2	14			19
Taiwan Province	Pingtung County	33	12	20	1	1	56
Taiwan Province	Taitung County	16	13	3			27
Taiwan Province	Hualien County	13	17	2			13
Taiwan Province	Penghu County	6	3	2			7
Fujian Province	Kinmen County	6	8			1	10
Fujian Province	Lienchiang County	4	5				
New Taipei City（Wulai District）		1					4
Taoyuan（Fuxing District）		1	1				2
Taichung（Heping District）		1	1				2
Kaohsiung（Maolin District, Taoyuan District, Namasia District）		3	2				7
Total		204	139	97	1	2	304
Note: The results of the election are subject to the Republic of China Central Election Commission.; Other parties include: Youth Party: 1 candidate in Kinmen County. Taiwan Advance Party: One candidate in Pingtung County.; The color of each municipality, county, and city is based on the party with the highest vote in the current election.

=== Results ===
Province	County	Members	Kuomintang	Democratic Progressive Party	Others	Independent
Special municipality （Mountain indigenous District）		Members	Kuomintang	Democratic Progressive Party	Others	Independent
Taiwan Province	Yilan County	12	8	3		1
Taiwan Province	Hsinchu County	13	10	0		3
Taiwan Province	Miaoli County	18	10			8
Taiwan Province	Changhua County	26	9	7		10
Taiwan Province	Nantou County	13	4	2		7
Taiwan Province	Yunlin County	20	1	9		10
Taiwan Province	Chiayi County	18	0	7		11
Taiwan Province	Pingtung County	33	8	7		18
Taiwan Province	Taitung County	16	9	1		6
Taiwan Province	Hualien County	13	12			1
Taiwan Province	Penghu County	6	2			4
Fujian Province	Kinmen County	6	3			3
Fujian Province	Lienchiang County	4	4			
New Taipei City（Wulai District）		1				1
Taoyuan（Fuxing District）		1	1			
Taichung（Heping District）		1				1
Kaohsiung（Maolin District, Taoyuan District, Namasia District）		3	2			1
Total		204	83	40	2	79
Note: The results of the election are subject to the Republic of China Central Election Commission.; The color of each municipality, county, and city is based on the party with the highest vote in the current election.

== Township/city council elections ==
=== Nominations ===
Province	County	Members	Kuomintang	Democratic Progressive Party	Labor Party	Trees Party	People's First Party	New Power Party	Others	Independent
Special municipality （Mountain indigenous District）		Members	Kuomintang	Democratic Progressive Party	Labor Party	Trees Party	People's First Party	New Power Party	Others	Independent
Taiwan Province	Yilan County	131	49	37				2		143
Taiwan Province	Hsinchu County	142	68	5	1	1	1			187
Taiwan Province	Miaoli County	193	17	6						295
Taiwan Province	Changhua County	317	47	85						385
Taiwan Province	Nantou County	163	43	5						208
Taiwan Province	Yunlin County	228	15	45						293
Taiwan Province	Chiayi County	193	19	6						247
Taiwan Province	Pingtung County	334	55	53					2	420
Taiwan Province	Taitung County	136	59	6				2		169
Taiwan Province	Hualien County	142	92	8					1	143
Taiwan Province	Penghu County	51	4	3		7				75
Fujian Province	Kinmen County	47	20						4	41
Fujian Province	Lienchiang County	22	20							13
New Taipei City（Wulai District）		7								13
Taoyuan（Fuxing District）		11	4							21
Taichung（Heping District）		11	6							12
Kaohsiung（Maolin District, Taoyuan District, Namasia District）		21	5							37
Total		2,149	523	259	1	8	1	4	7	2,702
註: The results of the election are subject to the Republic of China Central Election Commission.; The color of each municipality, county, and city is based on the party with the highest vote in the current election.

==== Results ====
Province	County	Members	Kuomintang	Democratic Progressive Party	Others	Independent
Special municipality （Mountain indigenous District）		Members	Kuomintang	Democratic Progressive Party	Others	Independent
Taiwan Province	Yilan County	131	37	26		68
Taiwan Province	Hsinchu County	142	51	1	1	89
Taiwan Province	Miaoli County	193	11	2		180
Taiwan Province	Changhua County	317	38	39		240
Taiwan Province	Nantou County	163	34	2		127
Taiwan Province	Yunlin County	228	13	28		187
Taiwan Province	Chiayi County	193	11	6		176
Taiwan Province	Pingtung County	334	43	39		252
Taiwan Province	Taitung County	136	42	3		91
Taiwan Province	Hualien County	142	65	4	1	73
Taiwan Province	Penghu County	51	3	1		47
Fujian Province	Kinmen County	47	17		2	28
Fujian Province	Lienchiang County	21	13			8
New Taipei City（Wulai District）		7				7
Taoyuan（Fuxing District）		11	4			7
Taichung（Heping District）		11	5			6
Kaohsiung（Maolin District, Taoyuan District, Namasia District）		21	3			18
Total		2,149	390	151	4	1,604
註: The results of the election are subject to the Republic of China Central Election Commission.; The color of each municipality, county, and city is based on the party with the highest vote in the current election.

== Village chief elections ==
=== Nominations ===
Special municipality		Members	Kuomintang	Democratic Progressive Party	People First Party	TSU	Chinese Unification Promotion Party	People's Democratic Party	New Power Party	Green Party Taiwan	Others	Independent
Province	County	Members	Kuomintang	Democratic Progressive Party	People First Party	TSU	Chinese Unification Promotion Party	People's Democratic Party	New Power Party	Green Party Taiwan	Others	Independent
Taipei		456	282	63				3			13	576
New Taipei		1,032	300	41			4	1	1		9	1,491
Taoyuan		504	132	3							7	844
Taichung		625	139	79							4	1,023
Tainan		649	64	115								1,217
Kaohsiung		891	173	218		1					1	1,320
Taiwan Province	Keelung City	157	33	4				1				258
Taiwan Province	Yilan County	233	38	8					1			401
Taiwan Province	Hsinchu County	192	77		1							318
Taiwan Province	Hsinchu City	122	20							1		209
Taiwan Province	Miaoli County	275	11								1	509
Taiwan Province	Changhua County	589	38	11			1				1	1,067
Taiwan Province	Nantou County	262	55	4								469
Taiwan Province	Yunlin County	391	11								1	739
Taiwan Province	Chiayi County	357	8								1	631
Taiwan Province	Chiayi City	84	20	2								128
Taiwan Province	Pingtung County	463	54	6			1					815
Taiwan Province	Taitung County	147	70	5	1				1		1	251
Taiwan Province	Hualien County	176	138	2								248
Taiwan Province	Penghu County	96	17	2								173
Fujian Province	Kinmen County	37	17								1	68
Fujian Province	Lienchiang County	22	23									10
Total		7,760	1,720	563	2	1	6	5	3	1	40	12,768

=== Results ===
Special municipality		Members	Kuomintang	Democratic Progressive Party	Chinese Unification Promotion Party	People First Party	New Power Party	People's Democratic Front	Others	Independent
Province	County	Members	Kuomintang	Democratic Progressive Party	Chinese Unification Promotion Party	People First Party	New Power Party	People's Democratic Front	Others	Independent
Taipei		456	216	35				1		204
New Taipei		1029	234	27	1		1			766
Taoyuan		504	90	2					2	410
Taichung		624	107	18						499
Tainan		649	42	53						554
Kaohsiung		887	123	130						634
Taiwan Province	Keelung City	157	21	2						134
Taiwan Province	Yilan County	233	23	5						205
Taiwan Province	Hsinchu County	192	42							150
Taiwan Province	Hsinchu City	121	14							107
Taiwan Province	Miaoli County	274	4						1	269
Taiwan Province	Changhua County	589	28	6						555
Taiwan Province	Nantou County	262	36	1						225
Taiwan Province	Yunlin County	390	5							385
Taiwan Province	Chiayi County	356	6							350
Taiwan Province	Chiayi City	84	16	1						67
Taiwan Province	Pingtung County	461	32	3						426
Taiwan Province	Taitung County	147	42	1		1			1	102
Taiwan Province	Hualien County	175	103	1						71
Taiwan Province	Penghu County	95	10							85
Fujian Province	Kinmen County	37	6							31
Fujian Province	Lienchiang County	22	20							2
Total		7,760	1,120	285	1	1	1	1	4	6,231

== Aftermath ==
President Tsai Ing-wen announced her resignation as chairperson for the Democratic Progressive Party; Premier William Lai also unilaterally announced his resignation on Facebook ; his resignation was approved in 2019. The DPP secretary general Hung Yao-fu and Secretary-General to the President Chen Chu also announced their resignations. Following the elections, the Taiwanese foreign minister claimed that China had meddled in the elections.

Defector and self-proclaimed former spy William Wang claimed that the government of China had successfully supported candidates in the 2018 Taiwanese local elections.

== See also ==
- 2019 Taiwanese legislative by-elections
- 2020 Kaohsiung mayoral recall vote
- 2020 Taiwanese presidential election
- 2020 Taiwanese legislative election
