= Hsu Ching-yuan =

Taiwanese politician (born 1957)

- 徐慶元
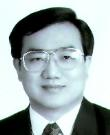

Magistrate of Taitung County
- In office 20 December 2001 – 20 December 2005
- Preceded by: Chen Chien-nien
- Succeeded by: Wu Chun-li

Member of Legislative Yuan
- In office 1 February 1999 – 20 December 2001
- Preceded by: Yao Eng-chi
- Succeeded by: Justin Huang
- Constituency: Taitung County

Personal details
- Born: 13 February 1957 (age 69) Taitung County, Taiwan
- Party: Independent

Hsu Ching-yuan (Chinese: 徐慶元; pinyin: Xú Qìngyuán) is a former Taiwanese politician. Huang served as a member of the Taitung County Council. During his career he ran as a Chinese Nationalist Party (KMT) representative, an independent, and a People First Party (PFP) candidate while also forming an alliance with and campaigning for the Democratic Progressive Party (DPP). He rose to become Taitung County Magistrate from 2001 to 2005 before quitting in the middle of his reelection campaign in 2005 and disappearing from public life. It is believed he left Taiwan to live in Canada.
