= Taitung Children's Story House =

Historical building in Taitung City, Taitung County, Taiwan

- 臺東兒童故事館
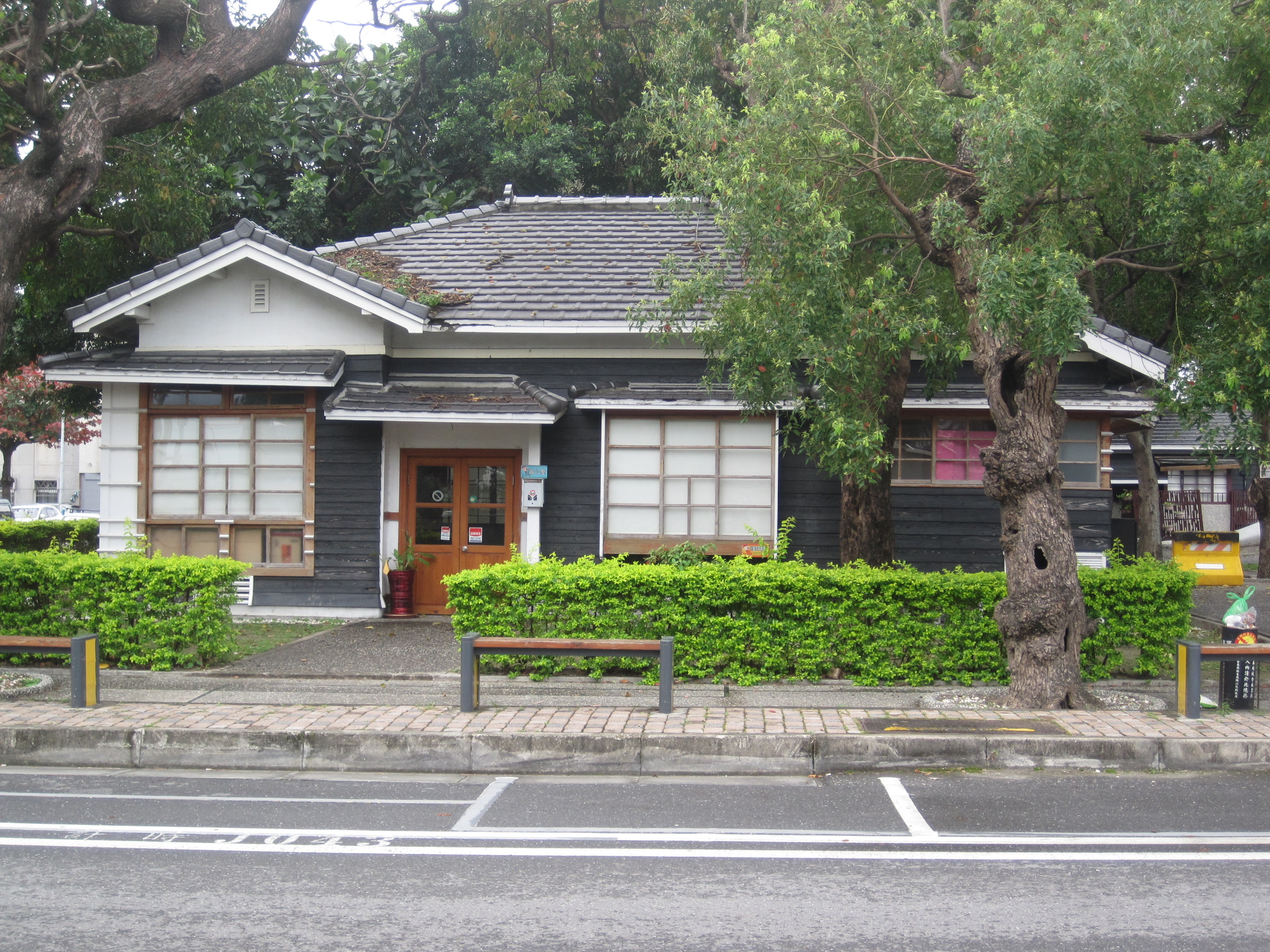
- Interactive map of the Taitung Children's Story House area

General information
- Location: Taitung City, Taitung County, Taiwan
- Coordinates: 22°45′7.1″N 121°9′16.1″E
- Opened: 2007

The Taitung Children's Story House (traditional Chinese: 臺東兒童故事館; simplified Chinese: 台东儿童故事馆; pinyin: Táidōng Értóng Gùshìguǎn) is historical building in Taitung City, Taitung County, Taiwan.

== History ==
The area used to be the dormitory and reception room of the Taiwan Tobacco and Liquor Corporation employees and chief since 1937. In 2003, the building and the surrounding area was handed over from the corporation to Taitung County Government for free. In 2005, the county government repaired and restored the area and turned into the Taitung Children's Story House in 2007. It was then given to Taitung County Family Education Center and handed over again to Taitung Story House Association in 2011.

== Architecture ==
The main building is a Japanese-style building. It features slide, lawn, tree house and cat trail.

== See also ==
- List of tourist attractions in Taiwan
