= Taitung =

Taitung, Tai Tung, or variants, may refer to:

- Taitung County (台東縣 or 臺東縣), a county located in eastern Taiwan
- Taitung City (台東市 or 臺東市), the seat of Taitung County
- Taitung Prefecture (臺東直隸州), former prefecture of Taiwan Province

== See also ==
- Taitung Airport (IATA code: TTT; ICAO code: RCFN), in Taitung, Taitung, Taiwan
- Taitung railway station, rail station in Taitung, Taitung, Taiwan
- Taitung line in Taiwan
- Sunset Peak (Hong Kong) AKA Tai Tung (大東山), third highest peak in Hong Kong
- Taitung County Council
- Taitung County Government
- Tai (disambiguation)
- Tung (disambiguation)
