= Wu Chun-li =

Taiwanese politician (born 1962)

- 吳俊立
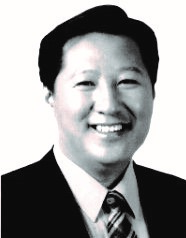

First Gentlemen of Taitung
- In role 17 April 2006 – 20 December 2009
- Magistrate: Kuang Li-chen
- Preceded by: Kuang Li-chen (as First Lady)
- Succeeded by: Chen Lien-yen (as First Lady)

10th Magistrate of Taitung
- In office 20 December 2005 – 23 January 2006
- Preceded by: Hsu Ching-yuan
- Succeeded by: Kuang Li-chen; Lai Shun-hsien (acting)

Personal details
- Born: 1962 (age 63–64) Taitung County, Taiwan
- Party: Kuomintang
- Spouse: Kuang Li-chen
- Relatives: Wu Hsiu-hua (sister)

Wu Chun-li (Chinese: 吳俊立; pinyin: Wú Jùnlì; born 1962) is a Taiwanese politician. He was elected Magistrate of Taitung in 2005 but was barred from taking office due to a corruption conviction.

== Career ==
=== Taitung Council ===
Wu Chun-li entered politics in 1998 as a KMT representative and became Taitung Council Speaker the following year. He was known for his opposition to the Taitung incinerator and was instrumental in having the budget for the incinerator frozen. In 1999 he was charged with corruption in relation to a budget skimming scheme.

=== Taitung Magistrate elections ===
In 2001, Wu Chun-li ran as the KMT candidate for County Magistrate but lost to Hsu Ching-yuan. In 2002 Wu was sentenced to 16 years jail in relation to the 1999 corruption charge. This was reduced to 7 years and eight months following a High Court review in Hualien. Wu maintained his innocence and appealed the decision.

==== 2005 Election ====
In 2005, Wu again ran for Taitung County Magistrate, this time as an independent. The incumbent, Hsu Ching-yuan, surprisingly quit the race weeks before the election date, whereupon he faced Liu Chao-hao, previously affiliated with the DPP, but also running as an independent. Following a tip-off during the campaign, Wu was charged with 'vote-buying'. He was released on NT$1 million (US$29,800) bail. "Wu told local reporters that he was innocent and he would continue his campaign after his release."

Despite comfortably winning the election, Wu faced the prospect of suspension by the Ministry of Interior due to his corruption conviction. Wu maintained "there was no issue of suspension" because the law applied to mayors and magistrates but his corruption lawsuit was related to his time as a county councillor, "As such, the law does not apply to me." However, Wu was subsequently "suspended from his post immediately upon assuming office"

Wu then appointed his wife, Kuang Li-chen, to the position of Deputy Magistrate so she could take over as Magistrate, but this was blocked due to nepotism regulations. Wu then divorced his wife to bypass these regulations. However, the Ministry of Interior ruled that as he was already disqualified from the position of Magistrate, he lacked the authority to appoint a Deputy Magistrate.

==== 2006 election ====
Subsequently, a new Magistrate election was called for April 1, 2006. Kuang Li-chen joined the KMT and became the KMT nomination. She achieved a landslide victory receiving 42,578 votes, more than double the 19,110 votes of her closest rival, former Taitung Deputy Magistrate Liu Chao-hao (劉櫂豪). Then-KMT Chairman Ma Ying-jeou was criticised "for campaigning for the ex-wife of a man who has been convicted of corruption and vote-buying."

It's unclear how much influence Wu exerted over his ex-wife whilst she was in office. During her term, Kuang's administration closed down the Taitung incinerator, but she became unpopular after she was "accused of wasting public funds on several trips abroad", including a trip to Thailand with Wu Chun-li (then a county councillor) and other government officials, and another to Europe "despite forecasts that Typhoon Fung-wong was heading for Taiwan".

Kuang was also a strong supporter of the controversial Taitung Miramar Resort.

=== Accusations of influencing judge ===
In 2009, Judge Lin Teh-sheng (林德盛), one of the judges assigned to Wu Chun-li's ongoing corruption case, was photographed visiting Wu's home "while the case was being reviewed at the High Court." According to a Taipei Times report, "Investigators suspected that Lin may have accepted bribes from Wu in exchange for influencing the outcome of the judicial review in Wu's favor." Wu had been placed under surveillance in May "after being suspected of having relations with various individuals involved with the case."

=== 2018 magistrate election ===
Kuang Li-chen, having relinquished the position of Magistrate in 2009 in favour of Justin Huang, was a surprise nomination as an independent for the 2018 Magistrate election. Wu Chun-li was reportedly "furious" when he learned of the move. As a KMT member and head of an association backing KMT Magistrate candidate Rao Ching-ling, he joined younger sister, Wu Hsiu-hua head of the KMT's Taitung branch, and outgoing Magistrate Justin Huang condemning her candidacy, which Huang called, "a DPP... divide and conquer tactic." Wu Chun-li said he would "get to the bottom of the incident".
