= 台東 =

台東 may refer to:

- Taito (disambiguation), in Japanese
  - Taitō, a special ward located in Tokyo, Japan
  - Taitō Station, a railway station in Japan
  - Taitō Prefecture, administrative division of Taiwan under Japanese rule (now called Taitung County)
- Taitung (disambiguation), in Chinese
