= Huang Shun-hsing =

Chinese politician

- 黃順興
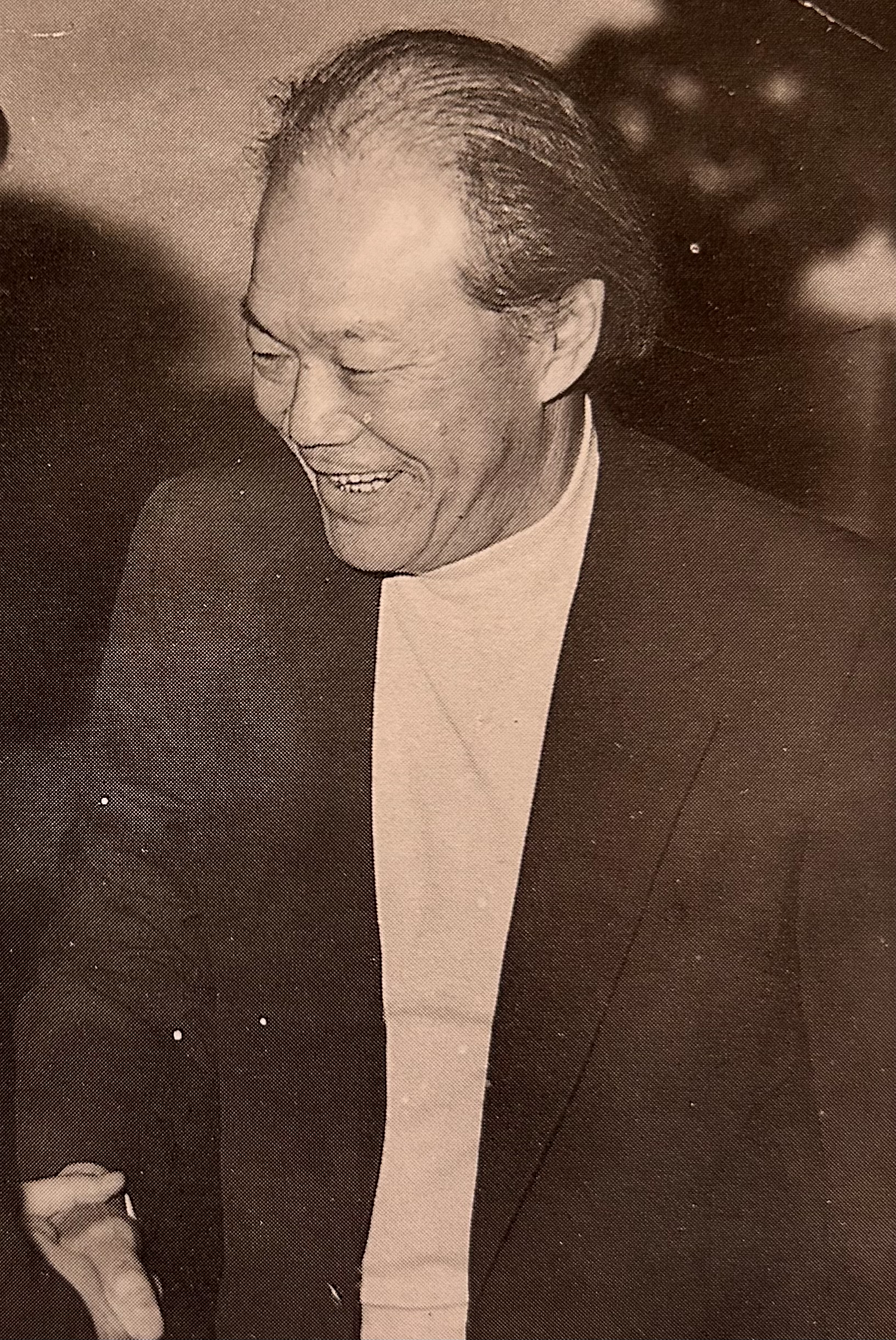

Member of the 7th National People's Congress
- In office 1988–1992

Member of the Legislative Yuan
- In office 1 February 1973 – 31 January 1981
- Constituency: Taiwan 3rd (Taichung, Taichung County, Changhua County, Nantou County)

Magistrate of Taitung County
- In office 2 June 1964 – 2 June 1968
- Preceded by: Huang Tuo-jung
- Succeeded by: Hwang Ching-fong

Personal details
- Born: 12 March 1923 Hashin, Inrin, Taichū Prefecture, Taiwan, Empire of Japan (today Puxin, Changhua County, Taiwan)
- Died: 5 March 2002 (aged 78) Beijing
- Party: Independent
- Other political affiliations: Chinese Youth Party

Huang Shun-hsing (Chinese: 黃順興; pinyin: Huáng Shùnxìng; 12 March 1923 – 5 March 2002) was a Chinese politician. Huang is one of very few politicians after 1949 that held office in both the Republic of China, and later in the People's Republic of China.

== Biography ==
Huang was raised in present-day Changhua County, Taiwan, while it was still ruled by Japan. He attended an agricultural school in Japan, then worked in Shanghai for two years before returning to Taiwan, settling in Taitung. Huang served on the Taitung County Council for three terms, and as Taitung County Magistrate for one term prior to contesting his first legislative election in 1972. Huang was re-elected to the Legislative Yuan in 1975. He was active in the tangwai movement, and contributed to Formosa Magazine. Huang favored unification with China. After he lost the Changhua County magistracy to George Huang in 1981, Huang Shun-hsing was imprisoned for a time because his daughter had left for China. Huang himself moved to Beijing in 1985. He was elected to the 7th National People's Congress in 1988, as an independent. Huang became known for voting against the confirmation of Zhou Gucheng, who won reelection as chair of the Education, Science, Culture and Public Health Committee. This was the first act of opposition at a meeting of the NPC since the body first met in 1954. Huang resigned from the NPC in 1992, over a disagreement regarding the Three Gorges Dam project, and died in 2002 of a heart attack.
