= Taitung County Constituency =

Constituency of the Legislative Yuan of Taiwan

Taitung County
- Single-member constituency for the Legislative Yuan
- District: Taitung County
- Electorate: 179,706

Current constituency
- Created: 2008
- Number of members: 1

Taitung County is represented in the Legislative Yuan since 2008 by one at-large single-member constituency (Taitung County Constituency, Chinese: 臺東縣選舉區; pinyin: Táidōng Xiàn Xuǎnjǔ Qū).

== Current district ==
- Taitung County

== Legislators ==
Kuomintang Democratic Progressive Party

Election	Taitung County
2008 7th	Justin Huang Chien-ting (2008-2009)^{1}
2008 7th	Lai Kun-cheng (2009-2012)
2012 8th	Liu Chao-hao
2016 9th	Liu Chao-hao
2020 10th	Liu Chao-hao
2024 11th	Huang Chien-pin

Justin Huang Chien-ting resigned in 2009 after elected Taitung County magistrate.

== Election results ==
=== 2024 ===
Legislative Election 2024: Taitung County Constituency
Party	Candidate	Votes	%	±%
Kuomintang	Huang Chien-Pin	25,778	34.79	−7.09
Democratic Progressive	Lie Kuen-Cheng	23,420	31.60	−21.49
Independent	Liu Chao-hao	18,744	25.29	
Independent	Hu Rui Gui	4,522	6.10	
Taiwan Obasang Political Equality Party	Huang WanJu	1,428	1.93	
Independent	Chen Chang Hung	211	0.28	
Majority		2,358	3.18	
Total valid votes		74,103		
Kuomintang gain from Democratic Progressive		Swing		

=== 2020 ===
2020 Legislative election
	Elected			Runner-up		
Incumbent	Candidate	Party	Votes (%)	Candidate	Party	Votes (%)
DPP; Liu Chao-hao	Liu Chao-hao	DPP	53.09%	Chang Chih-ming	Kuomintang	41.88%

=== 2016 ===
2016 Legislative election
	Elected			Runner-up		
Incumbent	Candidate	Party	Votes (%)	Candidate	Party	Votes (%)
DPP; Liu Chao-hao	Liu Chao-hao	DPP	64.18%	Chen Jien-ge	Kuomintang	35.82%
