= Wu Hsiu-hua =

Taiwanese politician (born 1973)

- 吳秀華

Speaker of the Taitung County Council
- Incumbent
- Assumed office 25 December 2018
- Deputy: Lin Tsung-han
- Preceded by: Yao Ching-ling

Taitung County Councilor
- Incumbent
- Assumed office 25 December 2014
- Constituency: District 1 (Taitung County and Orchid Island)

Personal details
- Born: 1 May 1973 (age 53) Taitung County, Taiwan
- Party: Kuomintang
- Spouse: Kao Wang Hsiu-yung (m. 2004)
- Relatives: Wu Chun-li (brother); Kuang Li-chen (sister-in-law)

Wu Hsiu-hua (Chinese: 吳秀華; born 1 May 1973) is a Taiwanese politician. She was first elected to the Taitung County Council in 2014 and has served as the council's speaker since 2018.

== Early life ==
As a child, Wu aspired to be a news anchor.

== Political career ==
Wu first ran for Taichung County Council in 2014, was backed by the Kuomintang (KMT), and won. During her first term on the county council, Wu received one vote for the speakership. In 2017, Wu became the first directly elected head of the KMT chapter in Taitung County. Wu's 2018 election as speaker of the Taichung County Council was the first time in county history that the council speakership and magistracy were simultaneously held by women. In 2022, Wu won a second speakership term.

In December 2025, the KMT nominated Wu as its candidate to run in the 2026 Taiwanese local elections, and succeed the term-limited incumbent Taitung County Magistrate Yao Ching-ling.

== Personal life ==
Wu Hsiu-hua is married to Kao Wang Hsiu-yung, a detective of Puyuma descent. After Wu became Taitung County speaker, she was entitled to a two-person security detail, and selected her husband as one of her guards. They attended the same junior high school, and married in 2004.

Her elder brother Wu Chun-li and sister-in-law Kuang Li-chen have served as magistrates of Taitung.
