= Luocuo Church =

Church in Puxin, Changhua County, Taiwan

- 羅厝天主教堂
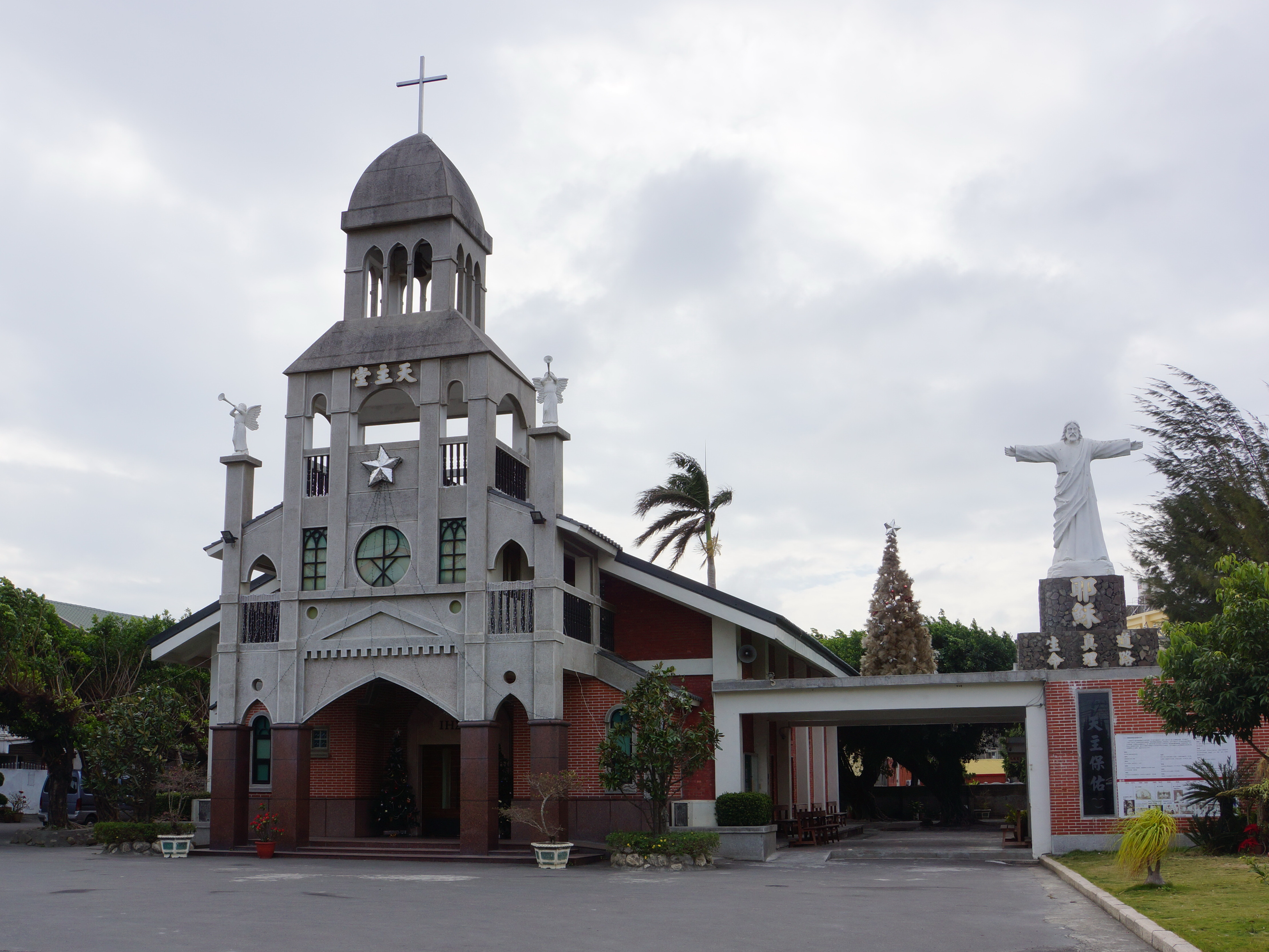
- Luocuo Church
- 23°56′16.1″N 120°30′48.9″E
- Location: Puxin, Changhua County, Taiwan

Architecture
- Architectural type: church
- Completed: 1875

Specifications
- Capacity: 200 worshipers

The Luocuo Church (traditional Chinese: 羅厝天主教堂; simplified Chinese: 罗厝天主教堂; pinyin: Luócuò Tiānzhǔ Jiàotáng) is a church in Puxin Township, Changhua County, Taiwan.

== History ==
The church was originally established in 1875 when a local resident invited Father Vinte Gomar of the Dominican Order to come to Puxin. Father Gomar then bought the land for 100 dollars in 1877. In 1882, Father Celedonio Arranz took over the work and built the first church structure. In 1906, an earthquake devastated Central Taiwan and destroyed the church structure. In 1912, Father Manuel Prat built the second church structure. In 1975, the old structure was torn down and rebuilt into the third generation structure. The construction was completed in 1996. The church was designated as historical structure on 10 April 2002.

== Architecture ==
The church is situated in a complex which consists of the church itself, artifact display room, dormitory, office building and a stone plaque. The current church structure is a red brick southern Fujian style architecture, which includes its rooms, doors, windows and walls. It combines Byzantine, Renaissance and Romanesque architectural elements. The façade of the artifact display room is filled with red brick walls and raised brick door. The building displays documents and artifacts, such as the first Latin alphabet printing press in Taiwan, an old church bell and Chinese hymns.

== See also ==
- List of tourist attractions in Taiwan
- Christianity in Taiwan
