= Chen Chien-nien =

Taiwanese politician (born 1947)

Adulumau Daliyalrep
- 陳建年
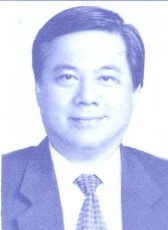

3rd Minister of Aboriginal Affairs
- In office 1 February 2002 – 10 March 2005
- Prime Minister: Yu Shyi-kun; Frank Hsieh
- Preceded by: Yohani Isqaqavut
- Succeeded by: Walis Perin

8th Magistrate of Taitung
- In office 20 December 1993 – 20 December 2001
- Preceded by: Lieh Cheng
- Succeeded by: Hsu Ching-yuan

Personal details
- Born: 10 October 1947 (age 78) Taitung County, Taiwan
- Party: Independent
- Other political affiliations: Kuomintang (until 2002)
- Spouse: Huang Yu-hsia
- Children: Asenay Daliyalrep
- Parent: Kouichi Agematsu (father)

Chen Chien-nien (Chinese: 陳建年; pinyin: Chén Jiànnián, Puyuma: Adulumau Daliyalrep; born 10 October 1947) is a Taiwanese former politician who served as the Magistrate of Taitung from 1993 to 2001 and Minister of the Council of Aboriginal Affairs from 2002 to 2005.

== Life and career ==
Born in Taitung City, Chen entered politics in 1981 as Taitung County councillor representing the Kuomintang (KMT). He served as Magistrate of Taitung from 1993 to 2001. A member of the Puyuma tribe, he is the only indigenous politician to have served as a county magistrate in Taiwan.

In 2002, Chen quit the KMT to accept the cabinet-level Minister of the Council of Aboriginal Affairs post in Chen Shui-bian's Democratic Progressive Party (DPP) administration. He resigned in 2005 due to a vote-buying charge, whilst continuing to maintain his innocence. Following a failed appeal to the Supreme Court in 2012, he was sentenced to nine months in jail.

His daughter, Asenay Daliyalrep, is currently serving as a member of the Legislative Yuan.
