= Puxin =

Rural township in Changhua County, Taiwan

Coordinates: 23°57′08.2″N 120°32′05.5″E

Puxin Township 埔心鄉 Pusin
- Rural township
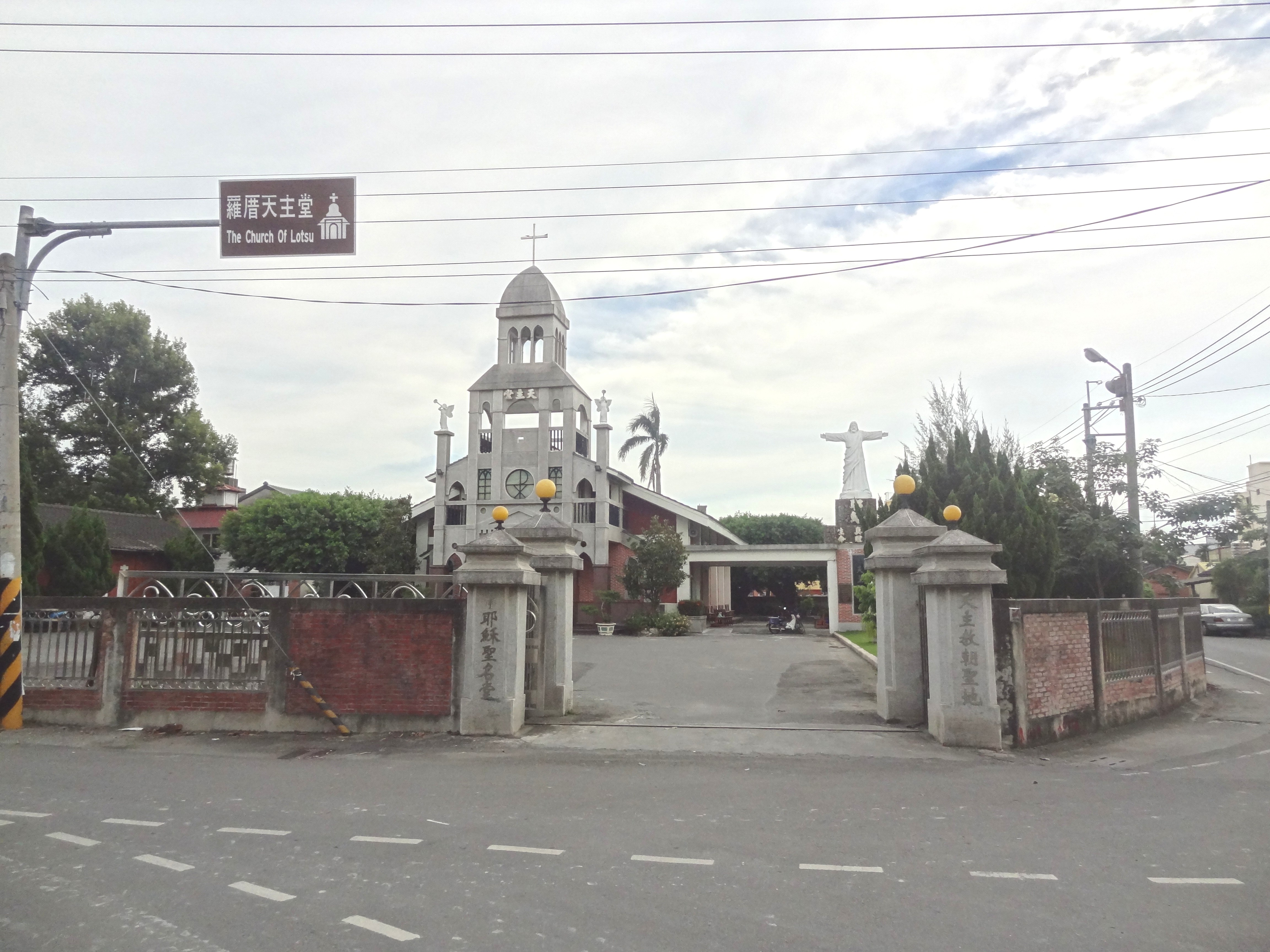

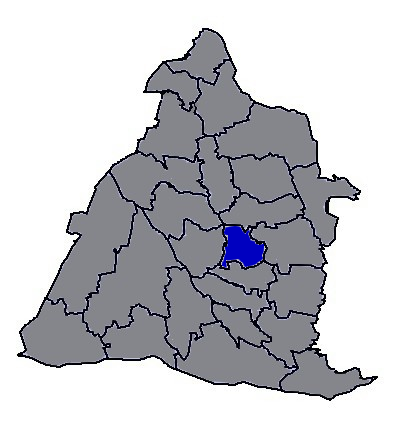
- Puxin Township in Changhua County
- Location: Changhua County, Taiwan

Area
  - Total: 21 km^{2} (8.1 sq mi)

Population (January 2023)
  - Total: 33,816
  - Density: 1,600/km^{2} (4,200/sq mi)

Puxin Township (Chinese: 埔心鄉; pinyin: Pǔxīn Xiāng), also written Pusin, is a rural township in Changhua County, Taiwan. It has a population of 34,788 and an area of 20.9526 square kilometres.

== Demographics ==
As of January 2023, Puxin had 10,488 households and a total population of 33,816, of which 17,945 were male and 16,843 female.

== Administrative divisions ==
The township is administered as 20 villages: Beijiao, Beixia, Dahua, Erzhong, Jingkou, Jiuguan, Luocuo, Nanguan, Puxin, Qiongjiao, Renli, Taiping, Tungmen, Wabei, Wanan, Wazhong, Wufeng, Xinguan, Yimin and Youju.

== Tourist attractions ==
- Luocuo Church
- Puxin Township Culture Museum

== Notable natives ==
- Huang Shun-hsing, Magistrate of Taitung County (1964–1968)
- Wei Ming-ku, Magistrate of Changhua County (2014–2018)
