= Kuang Li-chen =

Taiwanese politician (born 1963)

- 鄺麗貞
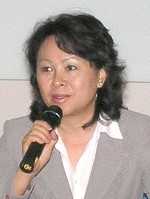

11th Magistrate of Taitung
- In office 17 April 2006 – 20 December 2009
- Preceded by: Wu Chun-li; Lai Shun-hsien (acting)
- Succeeded by: Justin Huang

First Lady of Taitung
- In role 20 December 2005 – 23 January 2006
- Magistrate: Wu Chun-li
- Preceded by: Chen Su-tsu
- Succeeded by: Wu Chun-li (as First Gentlemen)

Personal details
- Born: 12 March 1963 (age 63) Taipei, Taiwan
- Party: Independent (since 2018)
- Other political affiliations: Kuomintang (2006–2018)
- Spouse: Wu Chun-li
- Relatives: Wu Hsiu-hua (sister-in-law)

Kuang Li-chen (Chinese: 鄺麗貞; pinyin: Kuàng Lìzhēn; born 12 March 1963) is a Taiwanese politician who served as the Magistrate of Taitung from 2006 to 2009.

== Personal life and career ==
She was married to Wu Chun-li, who was elected to the Taitung County magistracy in 2005. Wu was suspended immediately after inauguration on charges of corruption and subsequently divorced Kuang so she could run for his post in her own right, as Taiwanese law forbid the appointment of spouses or other relatives as a magisterial deputy. Kuang joined the Kuomintang and won the Taitung magisterial by-election in April 2006, over three independent candidates. During her term, broadband internet access was installed throughout Taitung County. During the transitional justice referendum of 2008, she was a proponent of two-step voting, in which voters mark one ballot for political candidates before receiving a separate ballot for referendum questions.

Kuang presided over the eighth Festival of Austronesian Culture and the Taitung portion of the 2007 Wan-an exercise, an annual air-raid drill. She became well known for promoting tourism to Taitung County. Kuang was often abroad, and, when Typhoon Fung-wong hit Taiwan in July 2008, she was criticized for remaining in Italy on junket. Shortly after an investigation into her travels led by the Kuomintang's Evaluation and Discipline Committee began in August 2008, Kuang met with the Taitung County Prosecutors' Office for questioning. It was found that Kuang spent over NT$10 million on eight junkets abroad since taking office as magistrate. The Kuomintang suspended her party membership in August 2008. The Taitung Prosecutors' Office continued investigating Kuang into January 2009. Later that month, the Control Yuan impeached her, after choosing not to do so in December 2008.

Throughout 2009, Kuang ranked low in performance polls run by the China Times and Global Views. Despite losing a KMT primary to Justin Huang in May 2009, she was expected to campaign for a full term in that year's magisterial elections. In October, a month after the Taitung District Prosecutors Office stated that Kuang would not be indicted on corruption charges, she announced that she would support Huang's magisterial candidacy. Speculation that the Kuomintang had offered to nominate Kuang or Wu Chun-li to contest Huang's vacant legislative seat if Kuang withdrew from the magisterial election soon arose. The Kuomintang chose to run polls that would decide the nomination. Kuang registered for the election before poll results were revealed, managing to win the Kuomintang's support because her opponent was deemed ineligible to contest the nomination. Kuang faced Democratic Progressive Party member Lai Kun-cheng in the legislative election, and lost. The Central Election Commission released a list of candidates contesting the Taitung magistracy on 31 August 2018, which included Kuang. After the Kuomintang expelled her on 28 September, Kuang chose to remain in the race as an independent candidate.

2018 Taitung County mayoral results
No.	Candidate	Party	Votes	Percentage
1	Kuang Li-chen	Independent	3,049	2.55%
2	Liu Chao-hao (劉櫂豪)	Democratic Progressive Party	44,264	37.04%
3	Huang Yu-pin (黃裕斌)	Independent	640	0.54%
4	Peng Chuan-kuo (彭權國)	Independent	988	0.83%
5	Yao Ching-ling	Kuomintang	70,577	59.05%
Total voters			179,706	
Valid votes			119,518	
Invalid votes				
Voter turnout			66.51%	
