= List of county magistrates of Taitung =

The magistrate of Taitung is the chief executive of the government of Taitung County. This list includes directly elected magistrates of the county. The incumbent Magistrate is April Yao of Kuomintang since 25 December 2018.

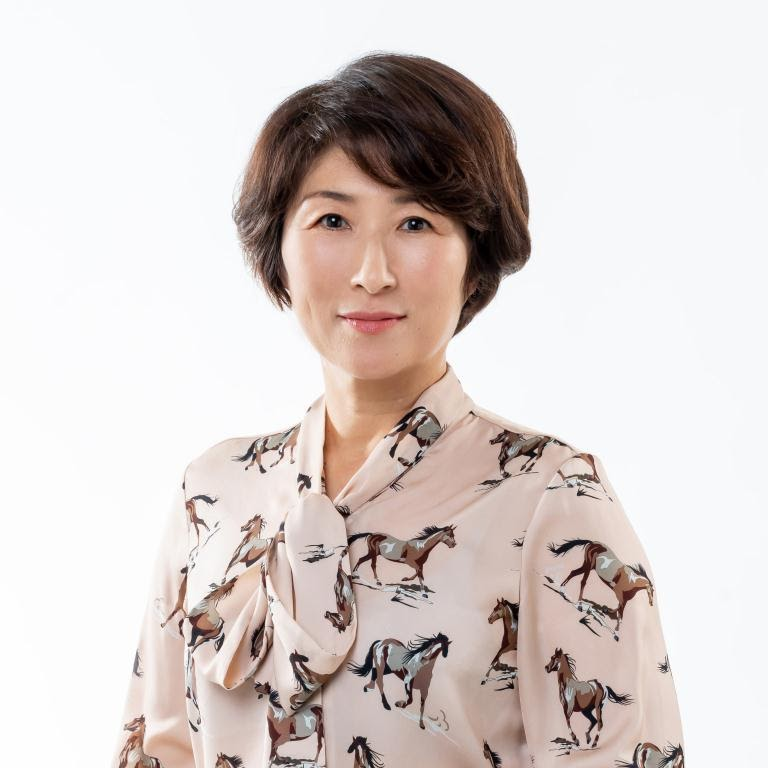
Incumbent Magistrate, April Yao

== Directly elected County Magistrates ==
Kuomintang Chinese Youth Party People First Party Independent

№	Portrait	Name (Birth–Death)	Term of Office		Political Party	Term
1		Chen Chen-tsung 陳振宗; Chén Zhènzōng (?-1951)	November 1950	October 1951	Kuomintang	1
–		Lu Ming 盧明; Lú Míng	October 1951	March 1952 As acting	Kuomintang	1
2		Wu Chin-yu 吳金玉; Wú Jīnyù	March 1952	June 1954	Kuomintang	1
2		Wu Chin-yu 吳金玉; Wú Jīnyù	June 1954	June 1957	Kuomintang	2
3		Huang Tuo-jung 黃拓榮; Huáng Tuòróng	June 1957	2 June 1960	Kuomintang	3
3		Huang Tuo-jung 黃拓榮; Huáng Tuòróng	2 June 1960	2 June 1964	Kuomintang	4
4		Huang Shun-hsing 黃順興; Huáng Shùnxīng (1923–2002)	2 June 1964	2 June 1968	Chinese Youth Party	5
5		Hwang Ching-fong 黃鏡峰; Huáng Jìngfēng (1930–2012)	2 June 1968	1 February 1973	Kuomintang	6
5		Hwang Ching-fong 黃鏡峰; Huáng Jìngfēng (1930–2012)	1 February 1973	16 July 1976	Kuomintang	7
–		Lee Hsueh-hsun 李學訓; Lǐ Xuéxùn	16 July 1976	20 December 1977 As acting	Kuomintang	7
6		Chiang Sheng-ai 蔣聖愛; Jiǎng Shèngài	20 December 1977	20 December 1981	Kuomintang	8
6		Chiang Sheng-ai 蔣聖愛; Jiǎng Shèngài	20 December 1981	20 December 1985	Kuomintang	9
7		John Lieh Cheng 鄭烈; Zhèng Liè	20 December 1985	20 December 1989	Kuomintang	10
7		John Lieh Cheng 鄭烈; Zhèng Liè	20 December 1989	20 December 1993	Kuomintang	11
8		Chen Chien-nien 陳建年; Chén Jiànnián (1947–)	20 December 1993	20 December 1997	Kuomintang	12
8		Chen Chien-nien 陳建年; Chén Jiànnián (1947–)	20 December 1997	20 December 2001	Kuomintang	13
9		Hsu Ching-yuan 徐慶元; Xú Qìngyuán (1957– )	20 December 2001	20 December 2005	People First Party	14
		Hsu Ching-yuan 徐慶元; Xú Qìngyuán (1957– )	20 December 2001	20 December 2005	Independent	14
10		Wu Chun-li 吳俊立; Wú Jùnlì (1962– )	20 December 2005		Independent	15
–		Lai Shun-hsien 賴順賢; Lài Shùnxián	21 December 2005	17 April 2006 As acting	Kuomintang	15
11		Kuang Li-chen 鄺麗貞; Kuàng Lìzhēn (1963– )	17 April 2006	20 December 2009	Kuomintang	15
12		Justin Huang 黃健庭; Huáng Jiàntíng (1959– )	20 December 2009	25 December 2014	Kuomintang	16
12		Justin Huang 黃健庭; Huáng Jiàntíng (1959– )	25 December 2014	25 December 2018	Kuomintang	17
13		April Yao 饒慶鈴; Ráo Qìnglíng (1969– )	25 December 2018	25 December 2022	Kuomintang	18
13		April Yao 饒慶鈴; Ráo Qìnglíng (1969– )	25 December 2022	Incumbent	Kuomintang	19

== See also ==
- Taitung County Government
