= Qinling (disambiguation) =

Qinling is a mountain range in Shaanxi, China.

Qinling may also refer to:

- Qinling Station, Chinese research station in Antarctica
- Qinling, Gansu, town in Qinzhou, Tianshui, Gansu, China
- Qin Mausoleum (Chinese: 秦陵; pinyin: Qínlíng) or Mausoleum of Qin Shi Huang in Xi'an, Shaanxi, China
- Qin Mausoleum (Chinese: 欽陵; pinyin: Qīnlíng), burial site of Emperor Liezu of Southern Tang (Li Bian) in Nanjing, Jiangsu, China
