= Taitung County Government =

Government of Taitung County, Taiwan

Coordinates: 22.7555°N 121.1506°E

- 臺東縣政府
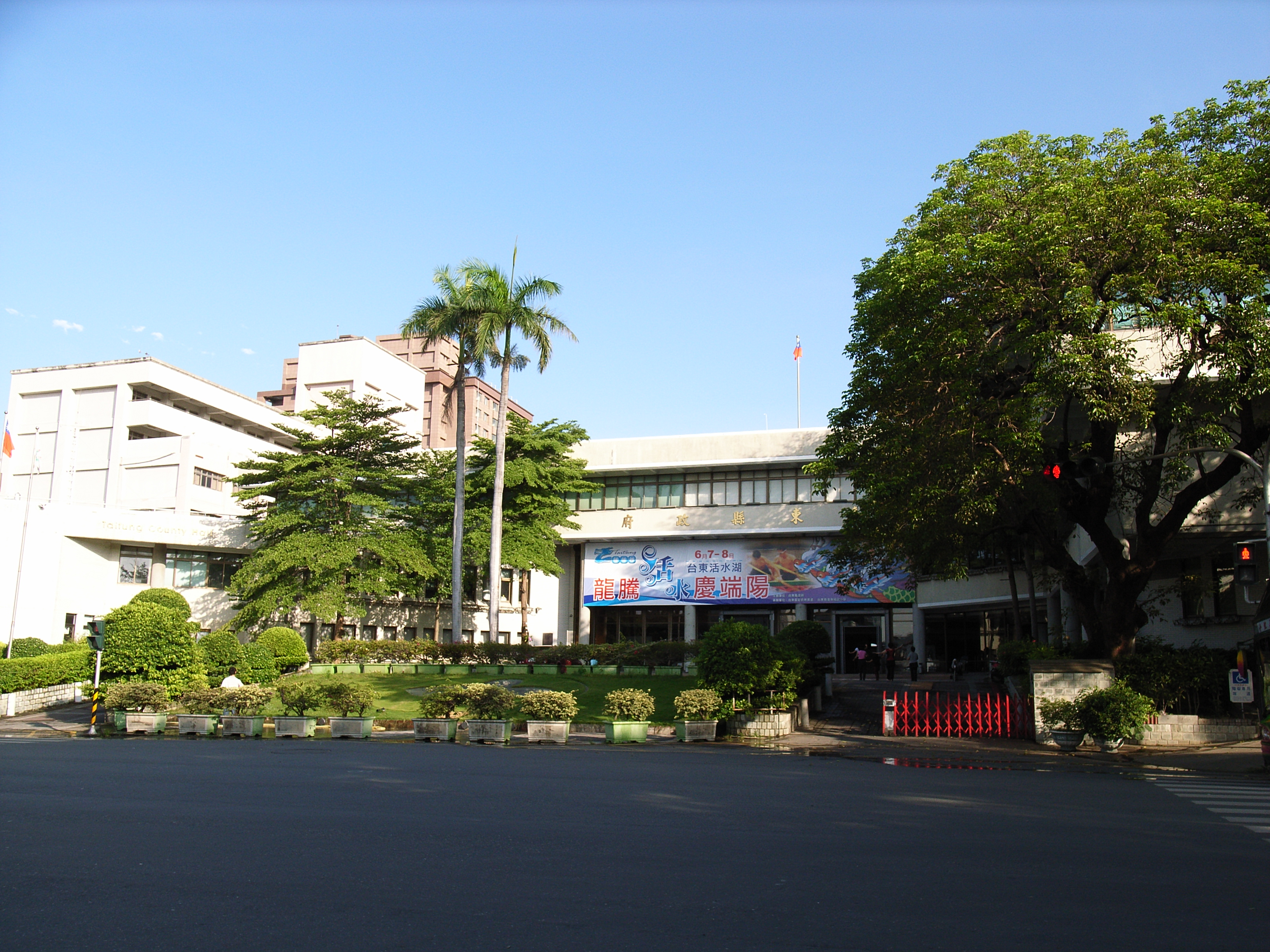

Agency overview
- Jurisdiction: Taitung County
- Headquarters: Taitung City
- Agency executive: Rao Ching-ling, Magistrate
- Website: Official website

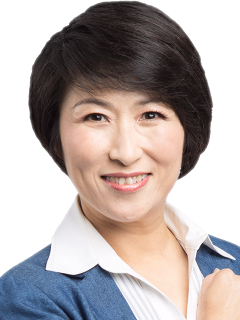
Rao Ching-ling, the incumbent Magistrate of Taitung County

The Taitung County Government (traditional Chinese: 臺東縣政府; simplified Chinese: 台东县政府; pinyin: Táidōng Xiàn Zhèngfǔ) is the local government of Taitung County, Taiwan.

== Organizations ==
- Civil Service Ethics Office
- Personnel Office
- Accounting and Statistics Office
- Planning Office
- General Affairs Office
- Indigenous People's Bureau
- Urban and Rural Development Bureau
- Cultural Affairs Bureau
- Tourism Bureau
- Land Administration Bureau
- Social Affairs Bureau
- Agriculture Bureau
- Education Bureau
- Public Works Bureau
- Finance Bureau
- Civil Affairs Bureau

== See also ==
- Taitung County Council
