= Qingling Motors =

Chinese vehicle manufacturer

Qingling Motors Co., Ltd
- Formerly: Chongqing Automobile Manufacturing Factory
- Company type: joint venture
- Traded as: SEHK: 1122
- Industry: Automotive
- Founded: May 1985; 41 years ago
- Headquarters: Jiulongpo, Chongqing, China
- Area served: China
- Key people: Yuguang Luo (chairman, CEO)
- Products: Commercial vehicles Diesel engines
- Owners: Qingling Motors (Group) Co., Ltd. (50.10%); Isuzu (20%)
- Website: www.qingling.com.cn

Qingling Motors Co., Ltd. (庆铃汽车有限公司) with headquarters in Chongqing is a Chinese automotive and commercial vehicle manufacturers, in place since May 1985. The work under the direction of the President Wu Yun operates as a joint venture in which a 50.1% stake, the Qingling Motors (Group) Co., Ltd. represents the major shareholder. The Japanese company Isuzu participates with a 20% stake in the company. On building the plant for a total investment of 2,482 million RMB. About 3,050 employees are currently employed at the plant.

Qingling exported to China the Isuzu Trooper as an import model from 1983 to 2005. At that point, the models were obtained from the Japan.

In the fall of 1987, production of the Isuzu Pickup was added. Three years later it was updated to the next generation model. For almost ten years it was the best selling model of Isuzu's in the People's Republic of China. The first SUV, introduced in 1993, was the Isuzu Mu. As a pure sports model from 1997, the company offered in limited quantities the Isuzu Tiejingang which is the sister model to the Japanese Isuzu VehiCROSS. The model name means "Iron King". In 2003, the manufacturer freshened the model range with the Isuzu Jingjizhe and an optical hybrid of Isuzu TF and Isuzu Rodeo, and replaced the Mu. The Isuzu Duogongnengche is a local model, which is an updated version of the Isuzu MU-7 . Both models are exclusively reserved for the Chinese market.

In the commercial vehicle sector, the company manufactures the Isuzu F-Series and the Isuzu Lingqingka, and the Chinese version of the Isuzu Elf is produced. The newest model in the lineup since 2010 is the Isuzu 700P.

Qingling Motors manufactures approximately 100,000 vehicles per year for the local market.

On February 29, 2016, the Ministry of Industry and Information Technology shut down Qingling Motors and 12 other automobile manufacturers that did not meet mandatory production evaluations for two consecutive years.

== Gallery ==
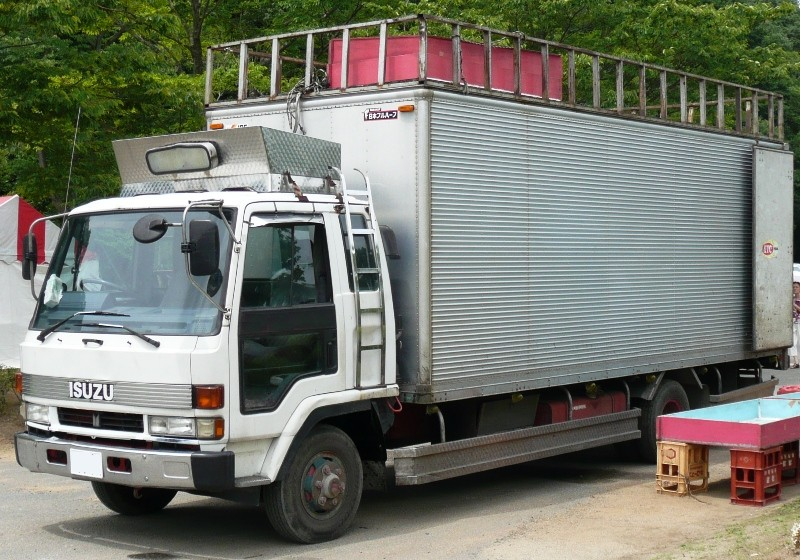
Isuzu F-Series
庆铃F重型商用车
1996-2016

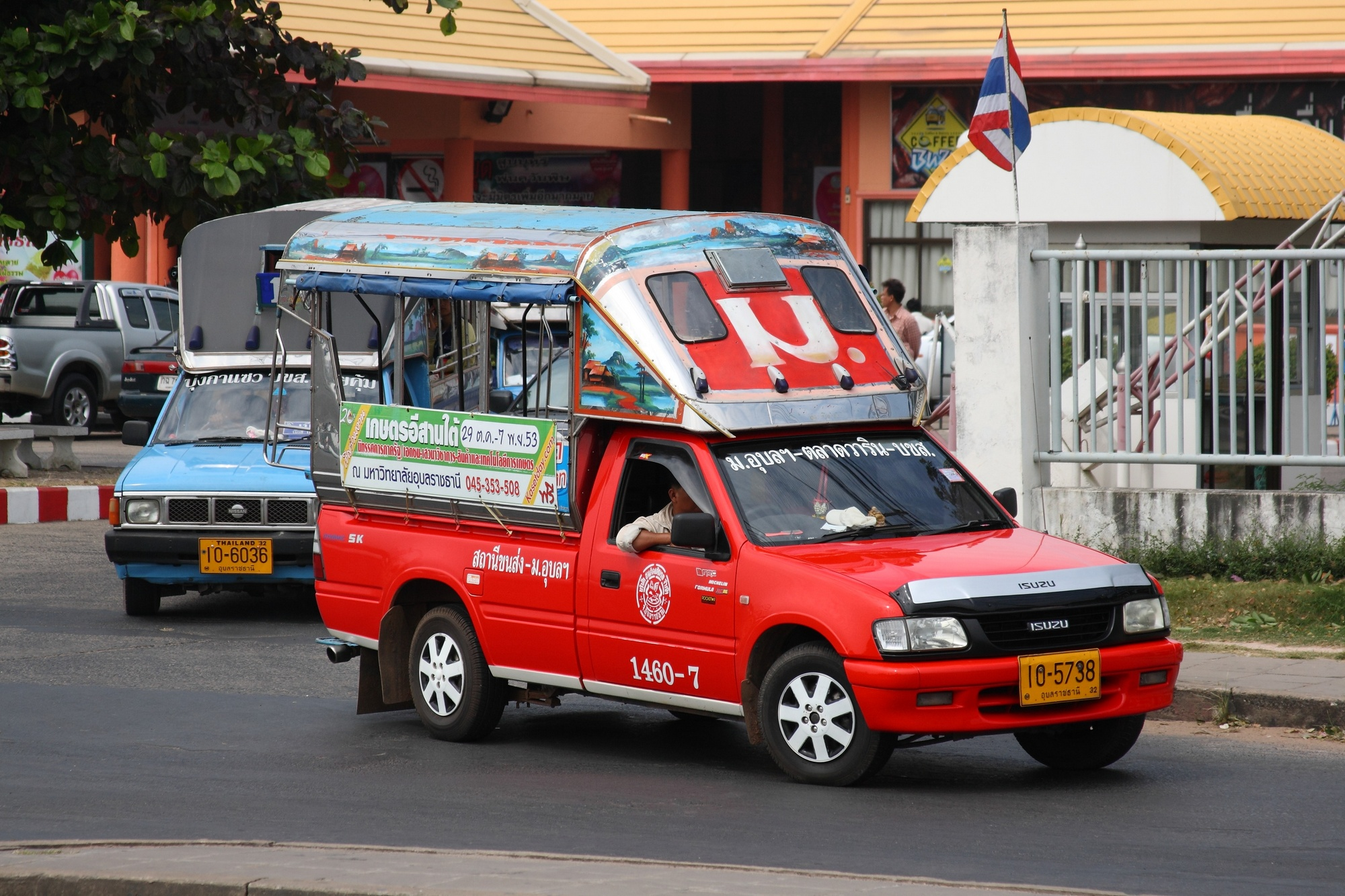
Isuzu Pika
庆铃皮卡
1997-2016

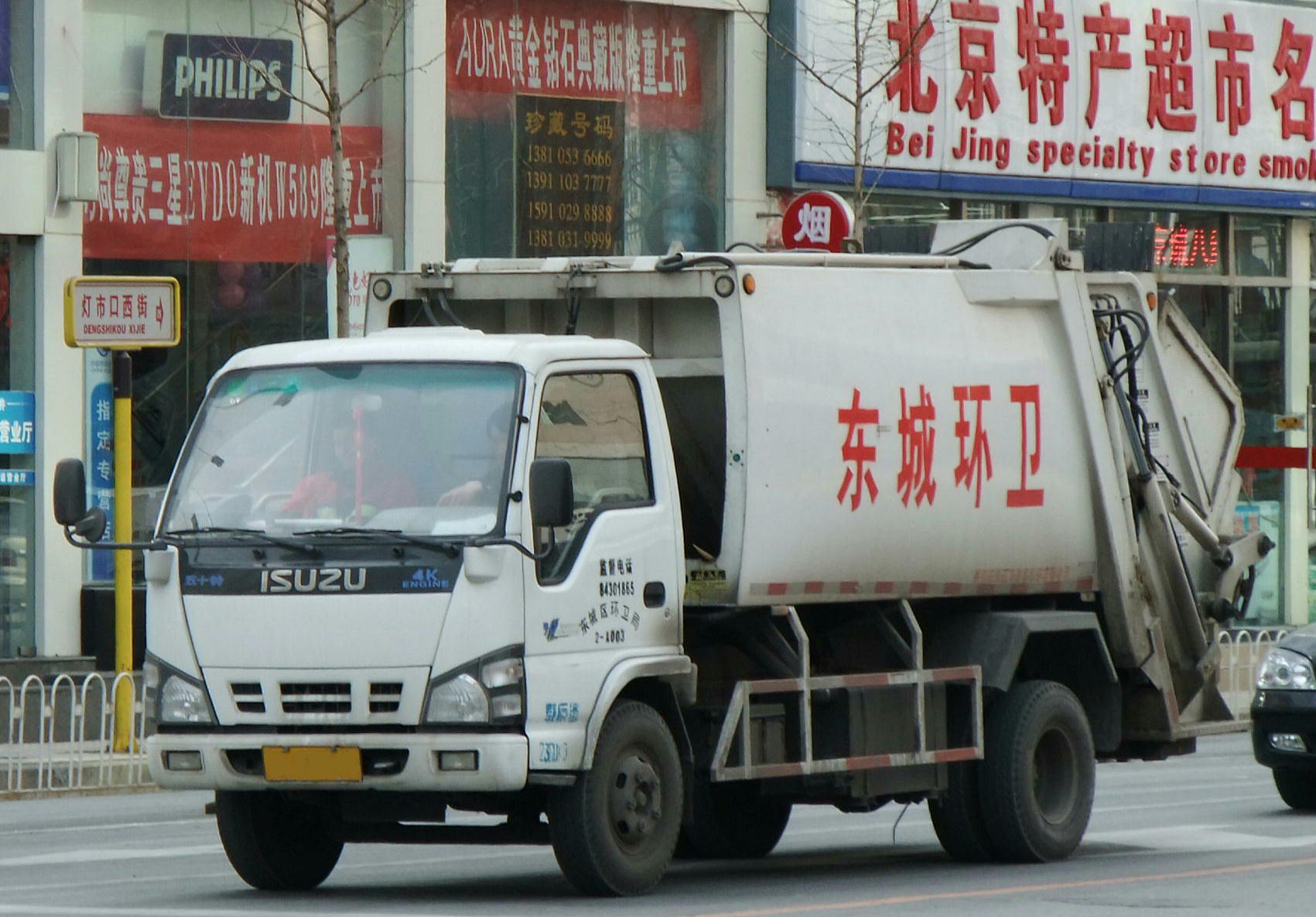
Isuzu Lingqingka
庆铃轻卡
2004-2016

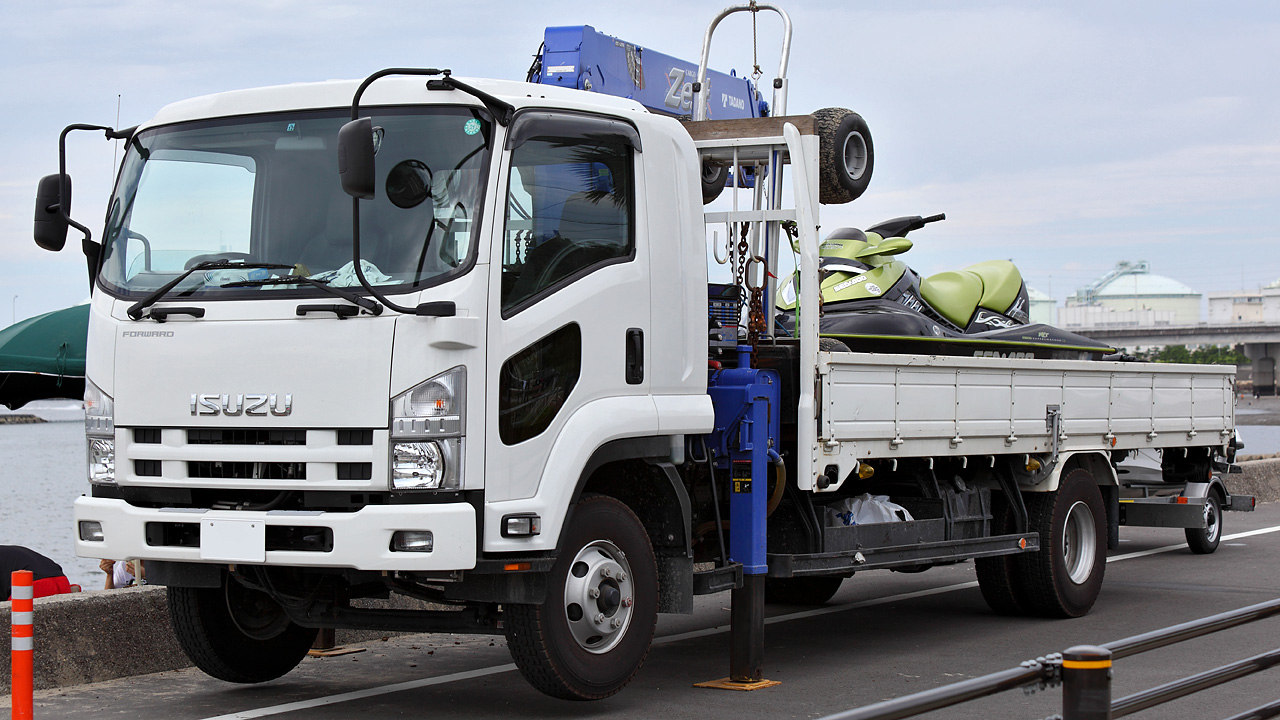
Isuzu 700P
庆铃700P
2010-2016

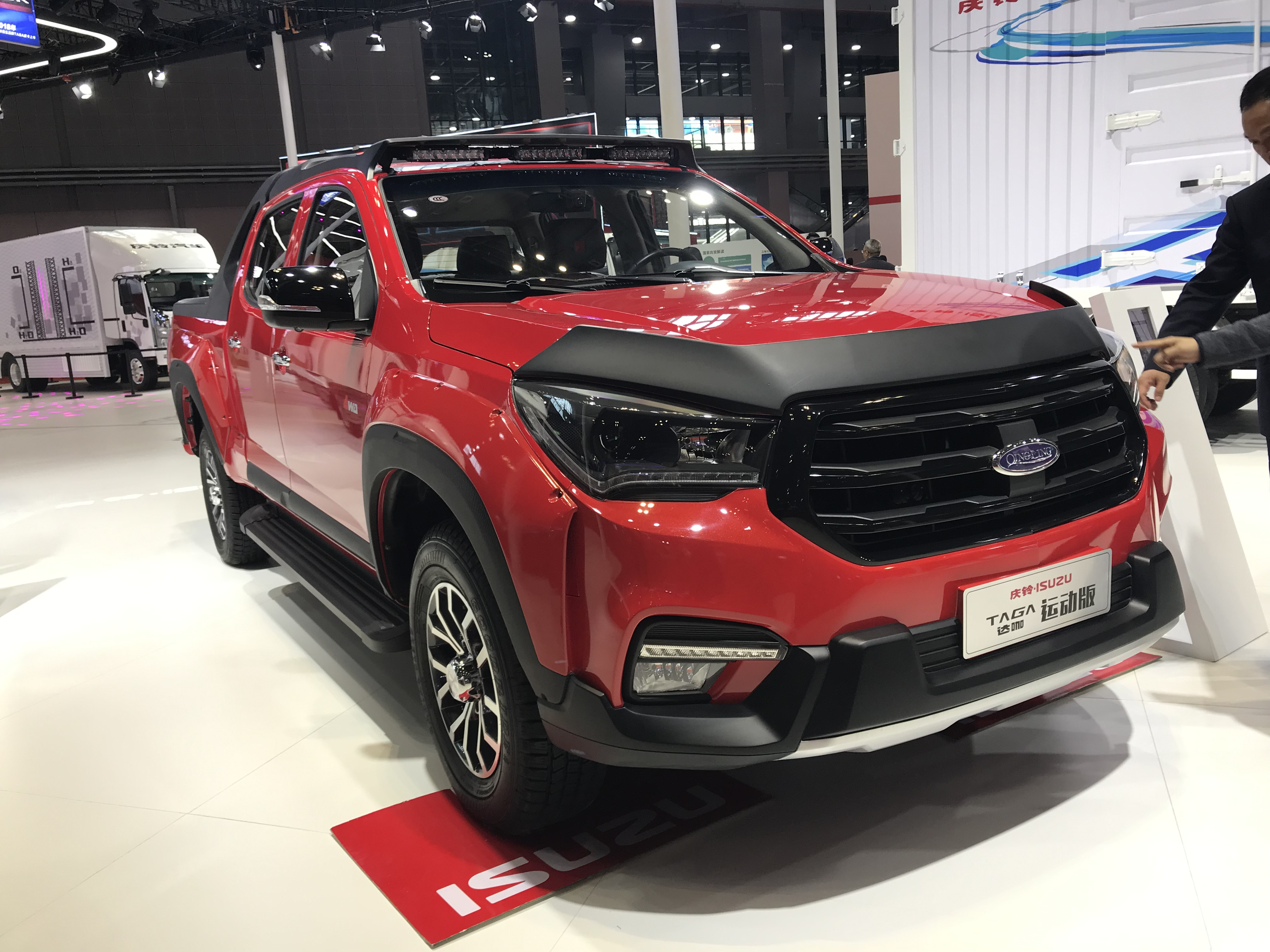
Qingling Taga
庆铃达咖

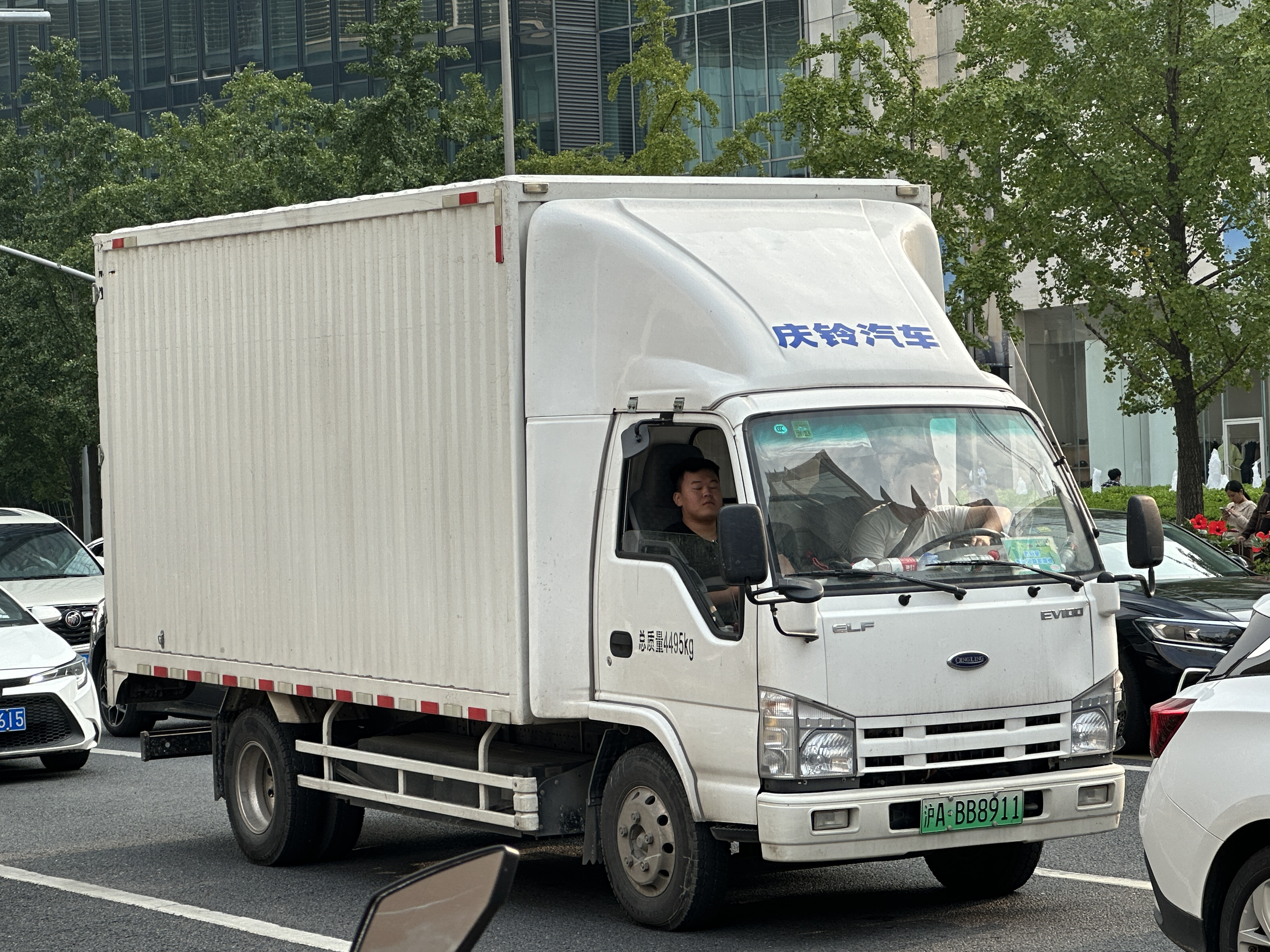
Qingling Elf EV100
庆铃Elf EV100

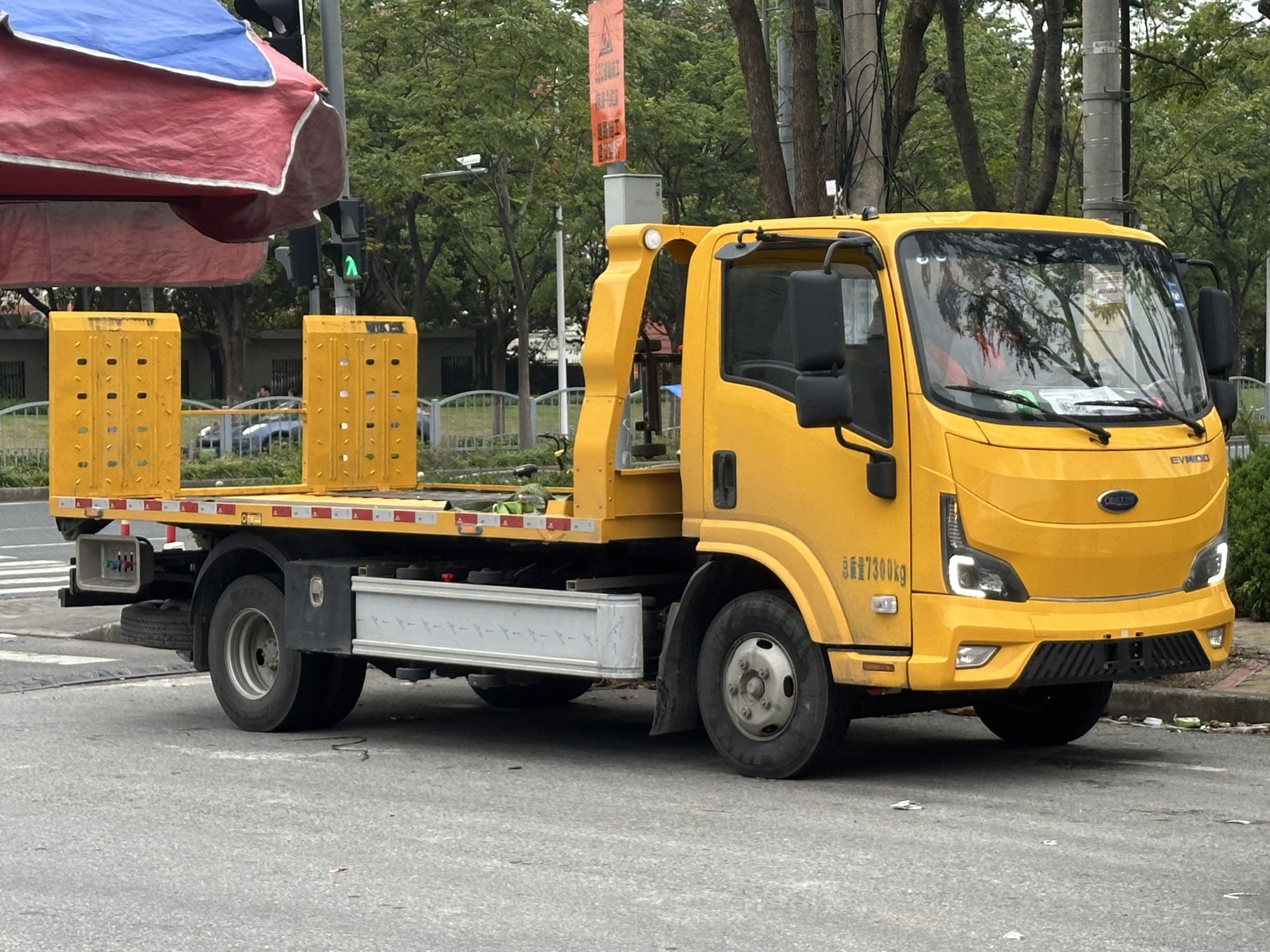
Qingling EVM100
庆铃 EVM100

Not pictured models:

- Isuzu Jingjizhe (庆铃竞技者, 2003-2016; SUV)
- Isuzu Duogongnengche (庆铃多功能车, 2005-2016; SUV)
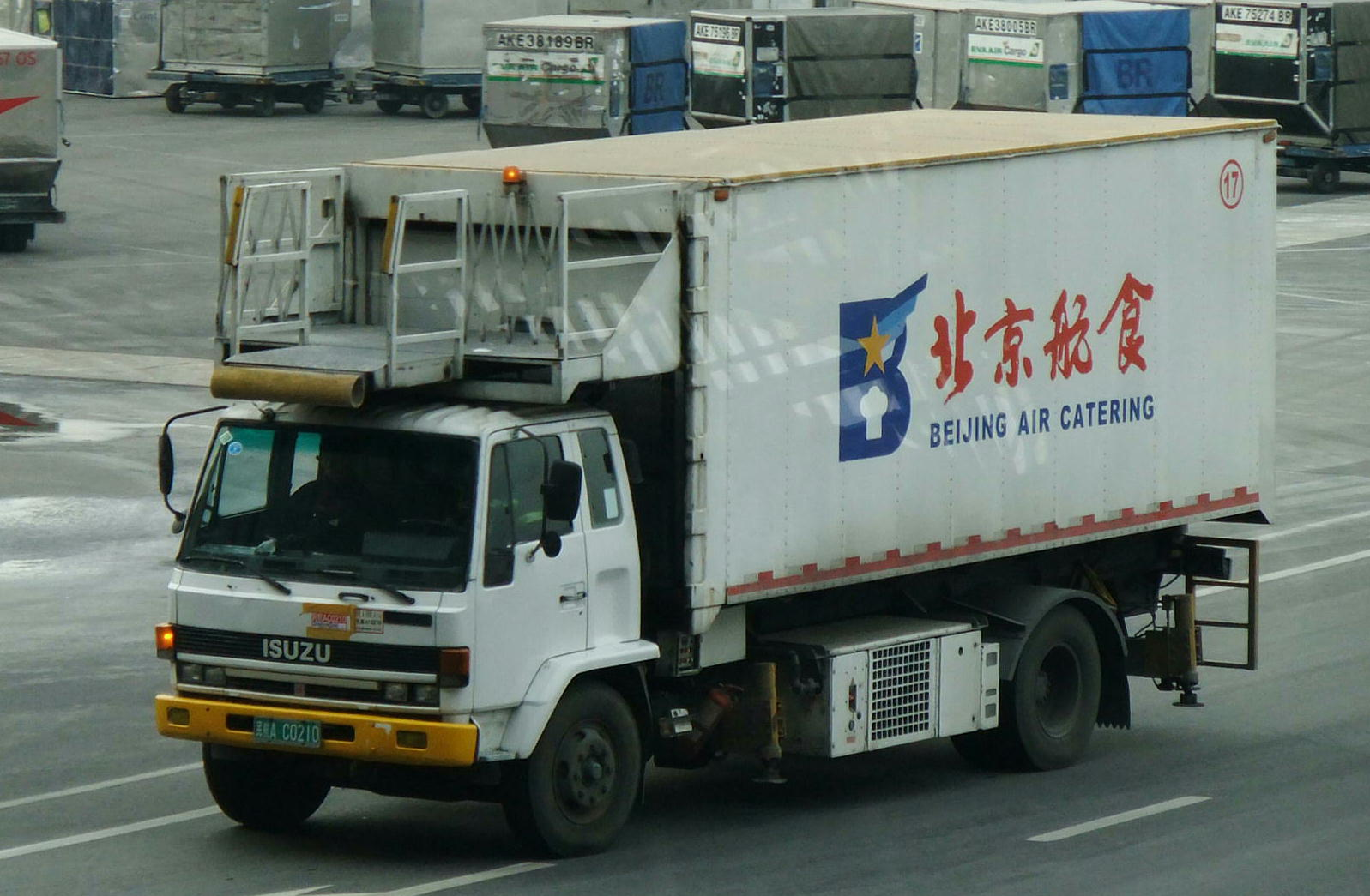
Isuzu F-Series
庆铃F重型商用车
1984–1996

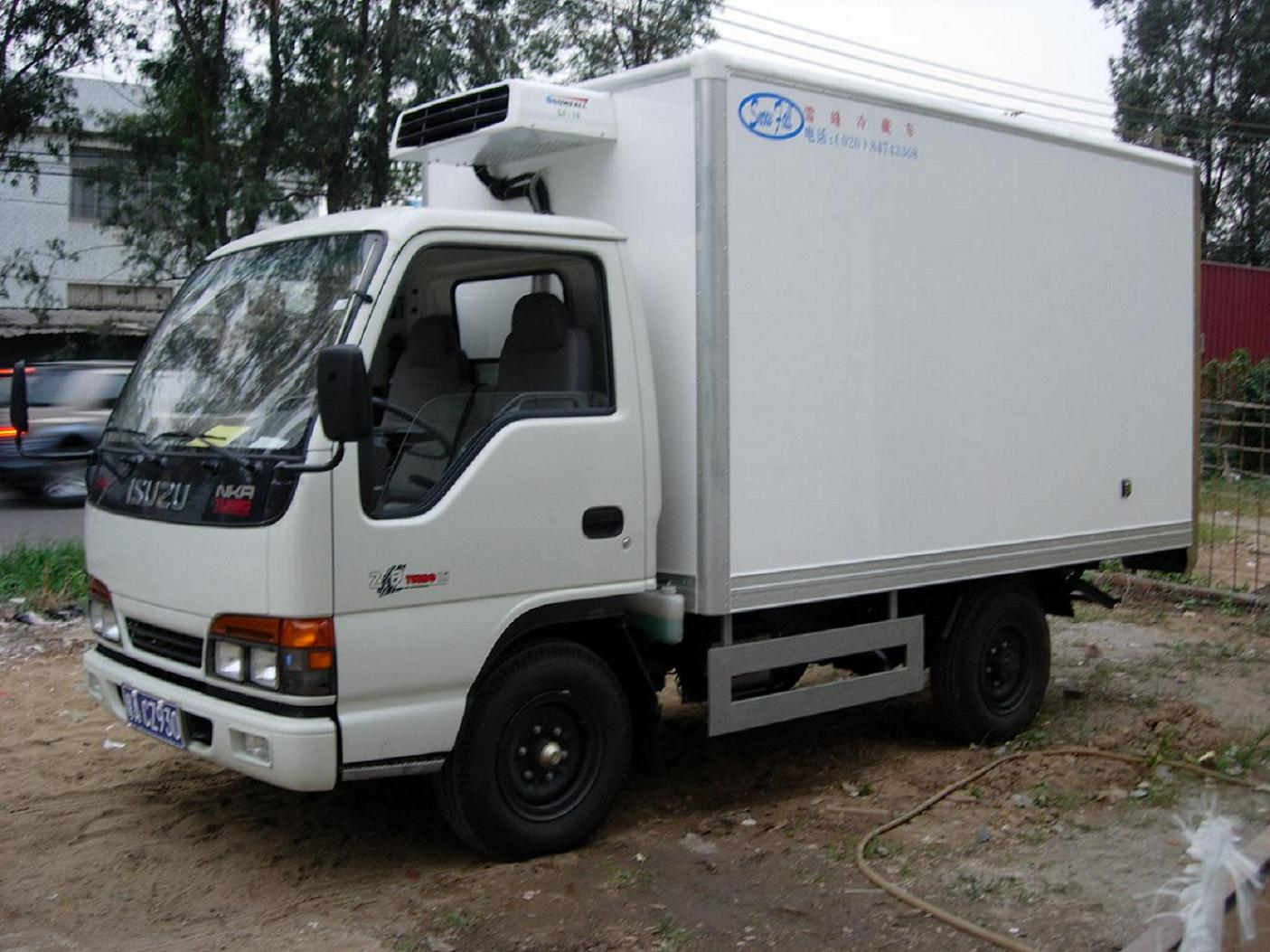
Isuzu Lingqingka
庆铃轻卡
1995–2004

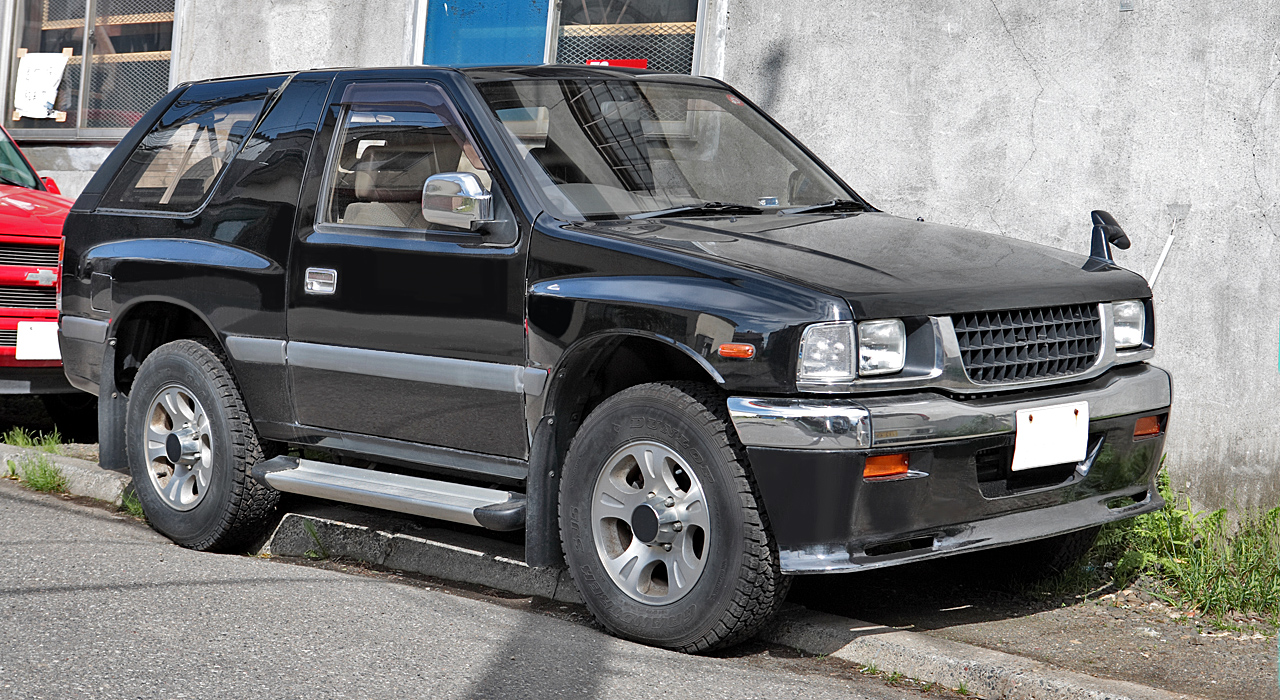
Isuzu Mu
五十铃Mu
1993–2003

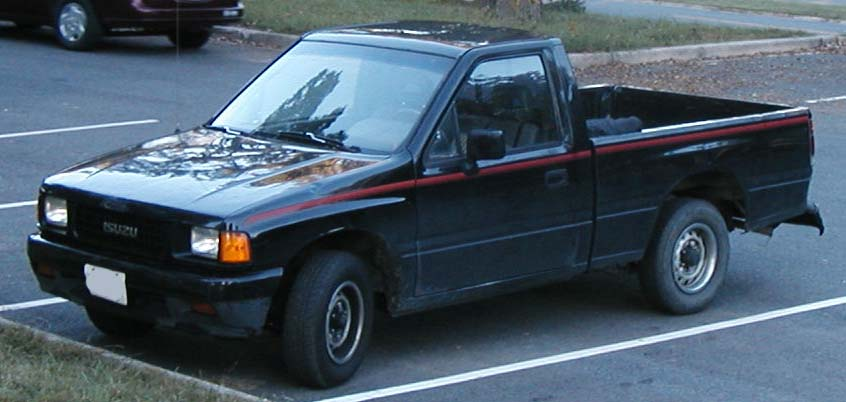
Isuzu Pickup
庆铃皮卡
1993–1998

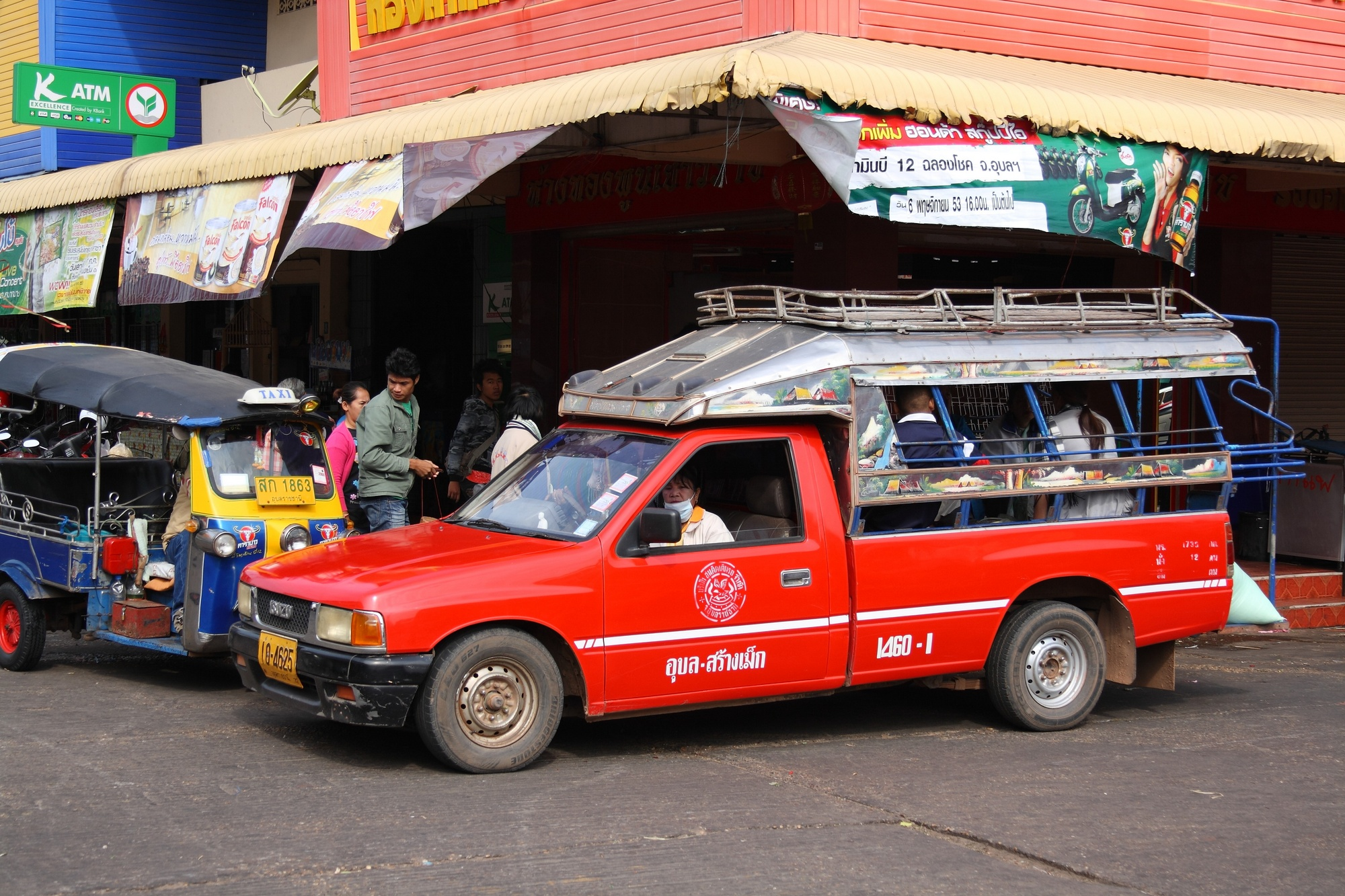
Isuzu Pickup
庆铃皮卡
1998–2016

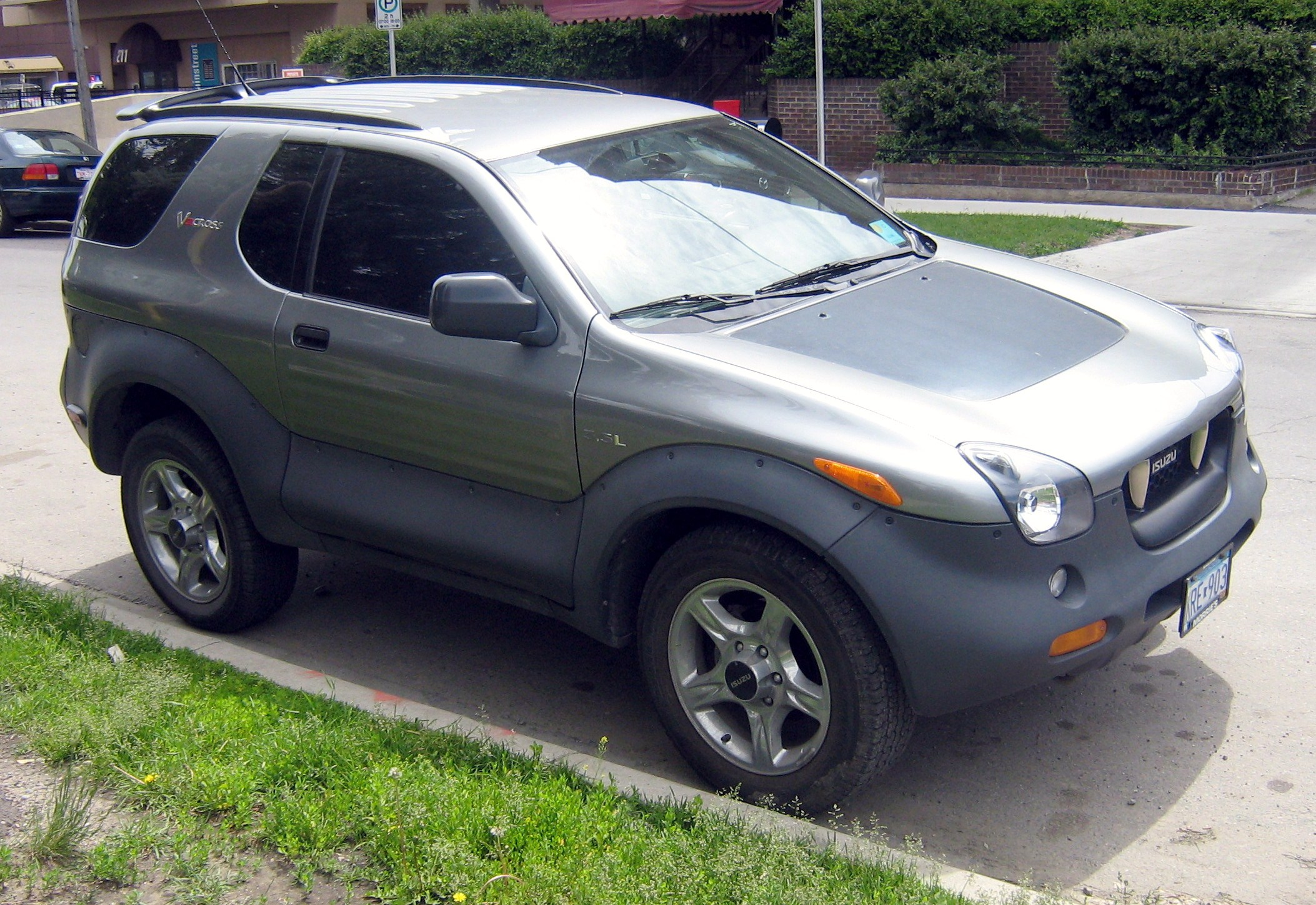
Isuzu Tiejingang
五十铃 铁金刚
1997–2001
