= Qingling Taga =

- Qingling Taga

Overview
- Manufacturer: Qingling Motors
- Also called: Qingling Taga H Sandeurs S100 (Vietnam)
- Production: 2017–present
- Model years: 2017–present
- Assembly: China: Chongqing; Vietnam: Ho Chi Minh City

Body and chassis
- Class: Mid-size pickup truck
- Body style: 4-door pickup truck
- Layout: Front-engine, rear-wheel-drive Front-engine, four-wheel-drive
- Platform: Isuzu Symmetric Mobility Platform
- Related: Chevrolet Colorado (RG); Chevrolet Trailblazer (RG); Isuzu D-Max (RT); Isuzu MU-X (RF)

Powertrain
- Engine: Diesel: 3.0 L 4JJ3-TCX I4; 3.0 L turbo; Petrol: 1.8 L I4 turbo
- Transmission: 5-speed manual

Dimensions
- Wheelbase: 3,125 mm (123.0 in)
- Length: 5,660 mm (222.8 in)
- Width: 1,885 mm (74.2 in)
- Height: 1,825 mm (71.9 in)

The Qingling Taga (庆铃达咖) is a mid-size pickup truck manufactured since december 2017 by Qingling Motors. The Taga is the first pickup truck made with technology heavily based on the Isuzu D-Max thanks to cooperation between Isuzu and Qingling Motors.

== History ==
Since the 2020s, a licensed version was made in Vietnam, partially from knock down kits, as the Sandeurs 100, by Vinh Phat Motors (VM).

== Design ==
Qingling Taga rear

The Taga has an 8-inch color display that supports navigation, Bluetooth, Wi-Fi and mobile connectivity, reverse camera, voice control, and an optional onboard camera.

The cargo bed of the Taga is 1,800 mm (71 in) long, 1,540 mm (61 in) wide and 480 mm (19 in) deep, and 850 mm (33 in) above the ground.

=== Specifications ===
The Qingling Taga is powered by an Isuzu 4KH1 series 3.0-litre diesel engine producing 131 hp (98 kW; 133 PS) and 280 N⋅m (207 lb⋅ft) mated to a 5-speed manual transmission. It is available as a 2-wheel-drive model and 4-wheel-drive models with the crew cab as the only body style offered.

== Qingling Taga H ==
A more expensive variant named the Qingling Taga H was launched in January 2021. It is powered by a 1.8-litre turbo gasoline engine producing 231 hp (172 kW; 234 PS) and 310 N⋅m (229 lb⋅ft) and a 3.0-litre turbo diesel engine producing 143 hp (107 kW; 145 PS) and 320 N⋅m (236 lb⋅ft). Both engines are mated to a 5-speed manual transmission.

The Qingling Taga H has a redesigned front end and slightly revised rear. The interior is fully revamped. The infotainment system supports Apple CarPlay and Baidu CarLife.
