= Justin Huang =

Taiwanese politician (born 1959)

Huang Chien-ting
- 黃健庭
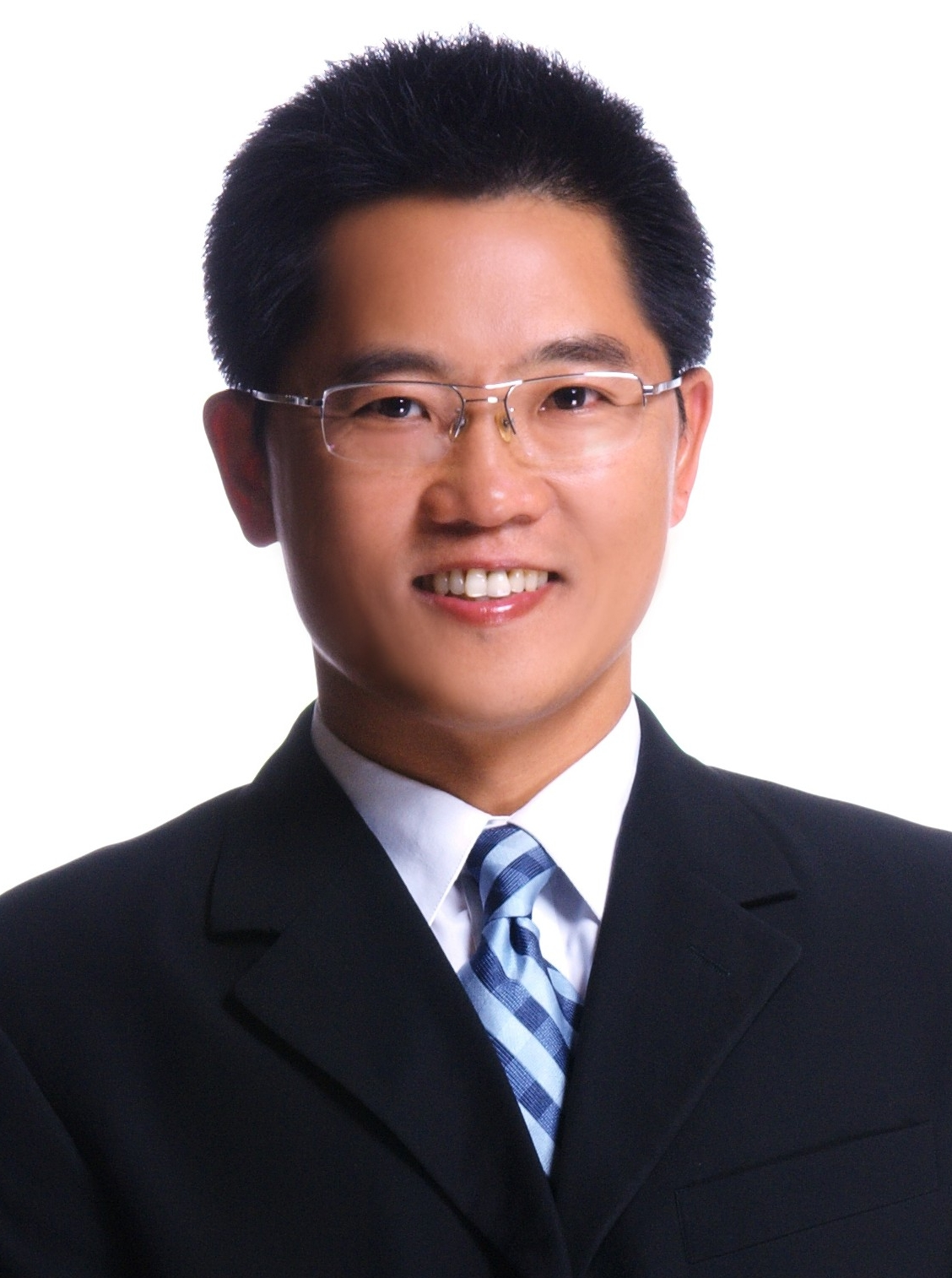

26th Secretary-General of the Kuomintang
- In office 30 October 2021 – 1 November 2025
- Chairman: Eric Chu
- Preceded by: Lee Chien-lung
- Succeeded by: Lee Chien-lung

12th Magistrate of Taitung
- In office 20 December 2009 – 25 December 2018
- Deputy: Chen Chin-hu
- Preceded by: Kuang Li-chen
- Succeeded by: April Yao

Member of the Legislative Yuan
- In office 1 February 2002 – 15 October 2009
- Preceded by: Hsu Ching-yuan
- Succeeded by: Lai Kun-cheng
- Constituency: Taitung County

Member of the National Assembly
- In office 20 May 1996 – 19 May 2000
- Constituency: Taitung County

Personal details
- Born: 6 November 1959 (age 66) Taitung County, Taiwan
- Party: Kuomintang
- Spouse: Chen Lien-yen (陳怜燕)
- Parent: Huang Ching-fong (黃鏡峰) (father)
- Education: National Chengchi University (BA); Santa Clara University (MBA)

Huang Chien-ting (Chinese: 黃健庭; pinyin: Huáng Jiàntíng; born 6 November 1959), also known by his English name Justin Huang, is a Taiwanese politician. He was a member of the National Assembly from 1996 to 2000. Huang was first elected to the Legislative Yuan in 2001 and served two full terms on the Legislative Yuan, and was reelected to a third in 2008. Huang stepped as a legislator in 2009 to run for Taitung County Magistrate. After two terms as county magistrate, Huang left office in 2018.

== Education ==
After graduating from Cheng Kung Senior High School, Huang obtained his bachelor's degree from the Department of International Trade of National Chengchi University in 1981. After graduating, he left Taiwan to study at Santa Clara University in the United States, where he completed a Master of Business Administration (M.B.A.).

== National Assembly ==
On 23 March 1996, Huang ran for the 1996 Taiwanese National Assembly election for Taitung County Constituency in which he and two other Kuomintang (KMT) candidates won and took office on 20 May 1996.

1996 Republic of China National Assembly Taitung County Constituency Result
3 seats
No.	Candidate	Party	Votes	Percentage
1	Liu Chao-chang (劉櫂漳)	Kuomintang	25,031	32.33%
2	Yang Ching-sheng (楊荊生)	Kuomintang	16,445	21.24%
3	Luo Kuo-liang (羅國樑)	New Party	3,133	4.05%
4	Chang Chia-chung (張甲長)	Democratic Progressive Party	15,064	19.46%
5	Justin Huang	Kuomintang	17,741	22.92%

== Legislative Yuan ==
=== 2001 legislative election ===
On 1 December 2001, Huang ran in the 2001 Taiwanese legislative election for the Taitung County Constituency in which he won and took office on 1 February 2002, succeeding legislator Hsu Ching-yuan.

2001 Republic of China Legislative Election Taitung County Constituency Result
No.	Candidate	Party	Votes	Percentage
1	Justin Huang	Kuomintang	30,255	42.52%
2	Tien Yung-yen (田永彥)	Democratic Progressive Party	21,866	30.73%
3	Hsu Jui-kui (許瑞貴)	People First Party	16,660	23.41%
4	Chan Hsing-hsiung (詹幸雄)	Taiwan Solidarity Union	1,945	2.73%
5	Chin Chi-hong (晉志宏)	New Party	430	0.60%
Eligible voters			122,239	
Total votes			72,251	
Valid votes			71,156	
Invalid votes			1,095	
Voter turnout			59.11%	

=== 2004 legislative election ===
On 11 December 2004, Huang ran for the 2004 Republic of China legislative election for Taitung County Constituency in which he won again and took office on 1 February 2005.

2004 Republic of China Legislative Election Taitung County Constituency Result
No.	Candidate	Party	Votes	Percentage
1	Justin Huang	Kuomintang	38,178	61.59%
2	Hsu Jui-kui (許瑞貴)	Democratic Progressive Party	23,551	37.99%
3	Chin Yi-fang (靳意芳)	Independent	259	0.42%
Eligible voters			121,819	
Total votes			62,343	
Valid votes			61,988	
Invalid votes			355	
Voter turnout			51.18%	

=== 2008 legislative election ===
On 12 January 2008, Huang ran in the 2008 Taiwan legislative election for the Taitung County Constituency in which he won again.

2008 Republic of China Legislative Election Taitung County Constituency Result
No.	Candidate	Party	Votes	Percentage
1	Hsu Chih-hsiung (許志雄)	Independent	21,080	37.01%
2	Justin Huang	Kuomintang	34,794	61.09%
3	Lin Yun-chu (劉昀筑)	Hakka Party	1,078	1.89%
Eligible voters			119,532	
Total votes			58,060	
Valid votes			56,952	
Invalid votes			1,108	
Voter turnout			48.57%	

== Taitung County Magistrate ==
=== 2009 local election ===
Huang was elected Magistrate of Taitung County after winning the 2009 Republic of China local election under the Kuomintang on 5 December 2009 and assumed office on 20 December 2009. Due to this win, he had to release his seat as legislator at the Legislative Yuan of Taitung County Constituency. He was succeeded by Lai Kun-cheng (賴坤成) of the Democratic Progressive Party.

2009 Taitung County Magistrate Election Result
No.	Candidate	Party	Votes	Percentage
1	Liu Chao-hao (劉櫂豪)	DPP	50,802	47.41%
2	Justin Huang	KMT	56,354	52.59%
Eligible voters			178,139	
Total votes			110,226	
Valid votes			107,156	
Invalid votes			3,070	
Voter turnout			61.88%	

=== 2014 local election ===
He was reelected for a second term in 2014 after winning the 2014 Republic of China local election on 29 November 2014 and took office on 25 December the same year.

2014 Taitung County Magistrate Election Result
No.	Candidate	Party	Votes	Percentage
1	Liu Chao-hao (劉櫂豪)	DPP	53,860	45.59%
2	Justin Huang	KMT	64,272	54.41%
Eligible voters			179,015	
Total votes			121,406	
Valid votes			118,132	
Invalid votes			3,274	
Voter turnout			67.82%	

=== Administration goals ===
In his 'Governor's Column', Justin Huang vowed to “Clean up corruption" in Taitung politics, and “Listen to the people... not lazy bureaucrats” in order to create jobs through development. In his autobiography Huang reflected: “Taitung is the first and only county to have passed the Taitung Autonomous Landscape Regulations Management Act which aims to protect the environment and develop local construction at the same time." The centrepiece of this was a new resort district along the coastal countryside of Taitung.

Huang made 18 trips to Mainland China to promote Taitung as a potential high-volume tourism resource. He promised to “Allow tour buses to freely travel”, while at the same time “Develop culture” and “Support indigenous youth”.

=== Popularity ===
Justin Huang received generally high popularity rankings while serving as Taitung Magistrate although discrepancies between different polls are evident. Whereas Global Views Monthly polls described Justin Huang and Hualien Magistrate Fu Kun-chi as “regulars in the ‘five-star club’” during the same period (2015-16), Huang ranked 10th and 8th out of 13 county magistrates in CommonWealth Magazine polls. In the 2018 CommonWealth poll, “Justin Huang (黃健庭) ... ranked second, followed by then-Hualien County commissioner (magistrate) Fu Kun-chi (傅崐萁)”

=== Achievements as Magistrate ===
During his two terms as County Magistrate, Huang lists his achievements as overseeing the introduction of the Taiwan International Balloon Festival (臺灣國際熱氣球間年華) and the Taitung Open of Surfing, redeveloping the Taitung Station while building a shopping mall and movie theater at the site of the old Taitung train station, pushing for the Puyuma express train to Taitung, and resolving the Taitung incinerator crisis.

== Pharmaceutical corruption charges ==
In 2008, Huang was indicted on charges about accepting bribes or using his position as legislator in relation to the Lotus (美時公司), Fisherman (派頓製藥公司), and I Sheng Pharmaceutical companies (羿盛公司) in 2004 and 2005, respectively. Huang denied the accusations. He was found guilty of violating the Accountancy Act with regard to processing payments from Lotus Pharmaceutical proxies through his charity foundations, and not guilty on all counts of corruption in 2016. He was sentenced to a combined 10 months of jail, later reduced into a fine due to the application of the 'Speedy Trial Act'.

== Nomination for Control Yuan ==
On 20 June 2020, it was reported that Justin Huang had been President Tsai’s nomination to become vice-President of the Control Yuan - an oversight branch of government that monitors and conducts investigations into the activities of the other branches. Huang’s Taitung County government was itself investigated and censured over its handling of the Miramar Resort.

However, a press conference scheduled to announce the nominations on 19 June was indefinitely canceled due to bipartisan criticism of the decision. Huang’s own party, the KMT, threatened to expel him for accepting a DPP nomination without prior consultation, while several DPP legislatures voiced concerns, including Lin Shu-fen (林淑芬), who wrote: “It is incomprehensible that the proposed nominee for vice president is someone who has been convicted of corruption, and helped a business push through the controversial development of the Taitung Miramar Resort (美麗灣渡假村)... by flouting the law and the rights of Aboriginals.” The New Power Party cited Huang’s role in promoting Miramar Resort as well as “his alleged acceptance of fees from pharmaceutical firms when he was a legislator and other legal disputes.”

In response, Huang held a press conference, where he announced: “If the KMT doesn’t support my nomination, I will withdraw from the party.” He then thanked President Tsai for her trust in him, saying he sought the position because “the Control Yuan exercises independent power beyond all party affiliations, and this is a role where I could do something for the nation and for society.” Following continued opposition, the next day Huang announced he had decided to withdraw from the nomination.

== Later political career ==
Huang's nomination as Secretary-General of the Kuomintang was approved at the 21st National Congress on 30 October 2021.

== Personal life ==
Huang is the son of former Taitung County Magistrate and KMT Internal Affairs Central Commissioner, Huang Ching-fong.

In 1987, Justin Huang married Chen Lien-yen (陳怜燕). As a couple, they are prominent members of the Taiwan Christian community. Chen introduced Huang to Christianity when they met while studying together at Santa Clara University in the 1980s. Huang was baptized by Top Church Pastor, Chang Mao-song (張茂松).

Huang is also the director of the Taitung County Young Workers’ Association, as well as being the founder and chairman of the Healthy Families Cultural and Educational Foundation, and the Taitung Student Parent Foundation.

Political offices
Preceded by Kuang Li-chen	Magistrate of Taitung County; 2009–2018	Succeeded by Rao Ching-ling
