= Yao Ching-ling =

Taiwanese political scientist and politician (born 1969)

- 饒慶鈴
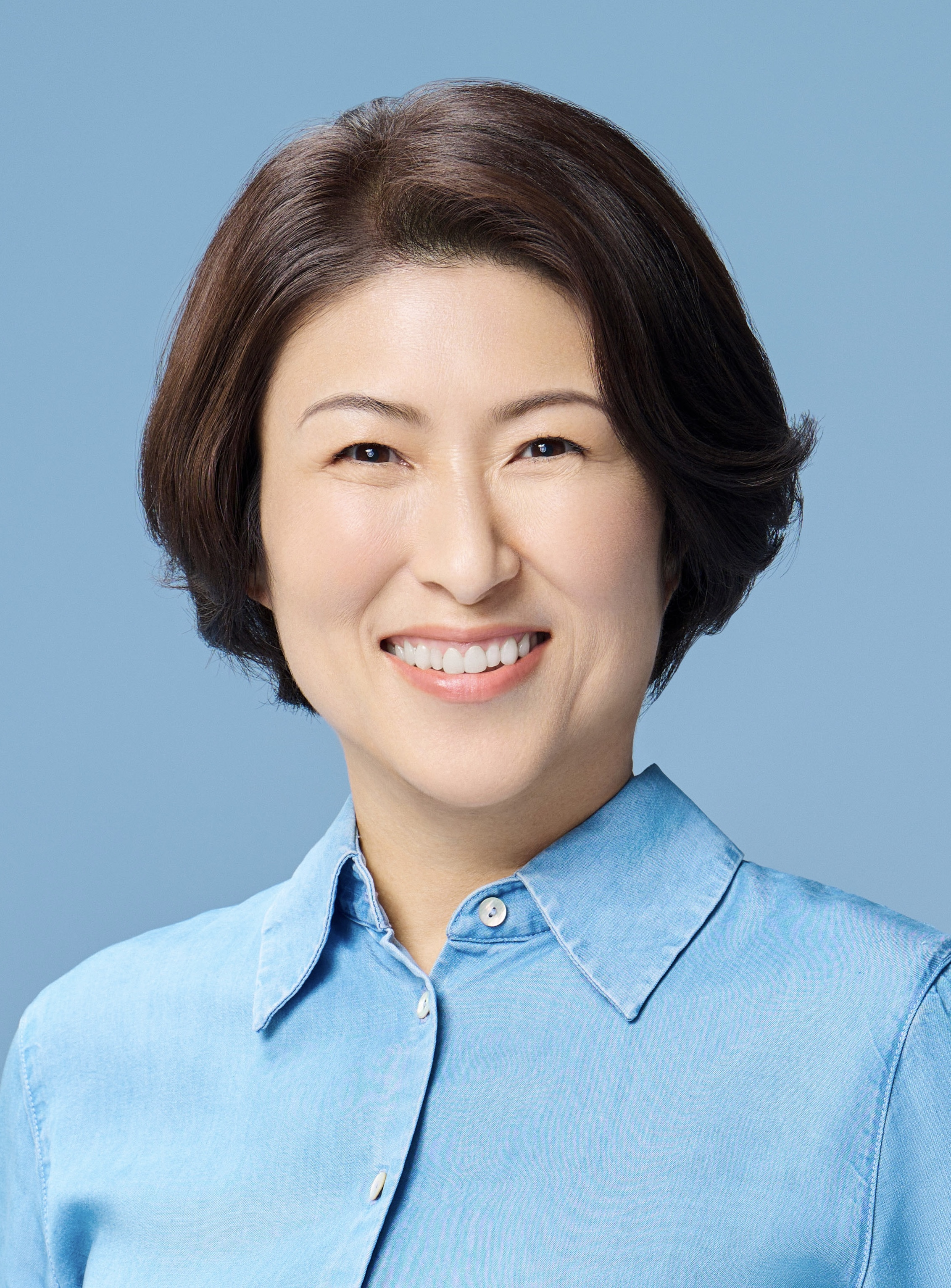
- Official portrait, 2022

13th Magistrate of Taitung
- Incumbent
- Assumed office 25 December 2018
- Preceded by: Justin Huang

Personal details
- Born: 23 November 1969 (age 56) Taitung County, Taiwan
- Party: Kuomintang
- Parent: Yao Eng-chi (father)
- Education: Fu Jen Catholic University (BA); San Jose State University (MA); National Taiwan Normal University (PhD)

Yao Ching-ling (Chinese: 饒慶鈴; pinyin: Ráo Qìnglíng; born 23 November 1969), also known by the English name April Yao, is a Taiwanese political scientist and politician who has served as the magistrate of Taitung since 2018. A member of the Kuomintang (KMT), she was previously elected as a member of Taitung County Council in 2005 and became speaker in 2010.

== Education ==
Yao graduated from Fu Jen Catholic University with a bachelor's degree in Chinese literature and earned a master's degree in media literacy from San Jose State University. She then earned her Ph.D. in political science from National Taiwan Normal University in 2005. Her doctoral dissertation was titled, "A comparative study of policies on overseas Chinese affairs in mainland China and Taiwan: Overseas Chinese education" (海峽兩岸推展僑務政策之比較研究：兼論僑教之比較).

== Political career ==
Yao was elected to the Taitung County Council after winning the local election on 3 December 2005, making her the youngest councilor to be elected at the age of 36. In 2010, she was elected as the speaker of the county council.

While serving on the county council, Yao explored bids for higher office, contesting Kuang Li-chen for the Taitung magistracy in 2009, and a seat on the Legislative Yuan in 2012. In 2016, Yao was appointed a deputy secretary-general of the Kuomintang, under chairwoman Hung Hsiu-chu.

=== 2018 Taitung County magistrate election ===
Yao defeated Liao Kuo-tung in a Kuomintang primary and subsequently received her party's nomination to contest the Taitung magistracy in 2018.

2018 Kuomintang Taitung County magistrate primary results
Candidates	Place	Results
April Yao	Nominated	Results not released
Liao Kuo-tung	2nd	Results not released

She faced Democratic Progressive Party challenger Liu Chao-hao and three independent candidates, including former county commissioner Kuang Li-chen. Yao won the magisterial election held on 24 November 2018.

2018 Taitung County mayoral results
No.	Candidate	Party	Votes	Percentage
1	Kuang Li-chen	Independent	3,049	2.55%
2	Liu Chao-hao	Democratic Progressive Party	44,264	37.04%
3	Huang Yu-pin (黃裕斌)	Independent	640	0.54%
4	Peng Chuan-kuo (彭權國)	Independent	988	0.83%
5	April Yao	Kuomintang	70,577	59.05%
Total voters			179,706	
Valid votes			119,518	
Invalid votes				
Voter turnout			66.51%	

=== 2025 trip to China ===
In January, Yao led a delegation to China and met with Taiwan Affairs Office head Song Tao, drawing criticism.

Political offices
Preceded by Justin Huang	Magistrate of Taitung County; 2018–present	Incumbent
