= Taitung County Council =

Legislature of Taitung County, Taiwan

Coordinates: 22.7683°N 121.1198°E

Taitung County Council 臺東縣議會

Type
- Type: county council

Leadership
- Speaker: Wu Hsiu-hua
- Deputy Speaker: Lin Tsung-han

Structure
- Seats: 30
- Political groups: KMT (18); NPSU (8); TPP (1); DPP (2)

Elections
- Voting system: single non-transferable vote
- Last election: 2022

Meeting place
- The Building of Taitung County Council; Taitung City, Taitung County, Taiwan

Website
- Official website (in Chinese)

The Taitung County Council (traditional Chinese: 臺東縣議會; simplified Chinese: 台东县议会; pinyin: Táidōng Xiàn Yìhuì) is the elected county council of Taitung County, Republic of China. The council composes of 30 councilors lastly elected through the 2022 Republic of China local election on 26 November 2022.

== See also ==
- Taitung County Government
