= 2026 Taiwanese local elections =

- 28 November 2026

22 mayors/magistrates 919 city/county councillors 204 township/city mayors and indigenous district chief administrators 2,139 township/city council representatives 7,748 village chiefs
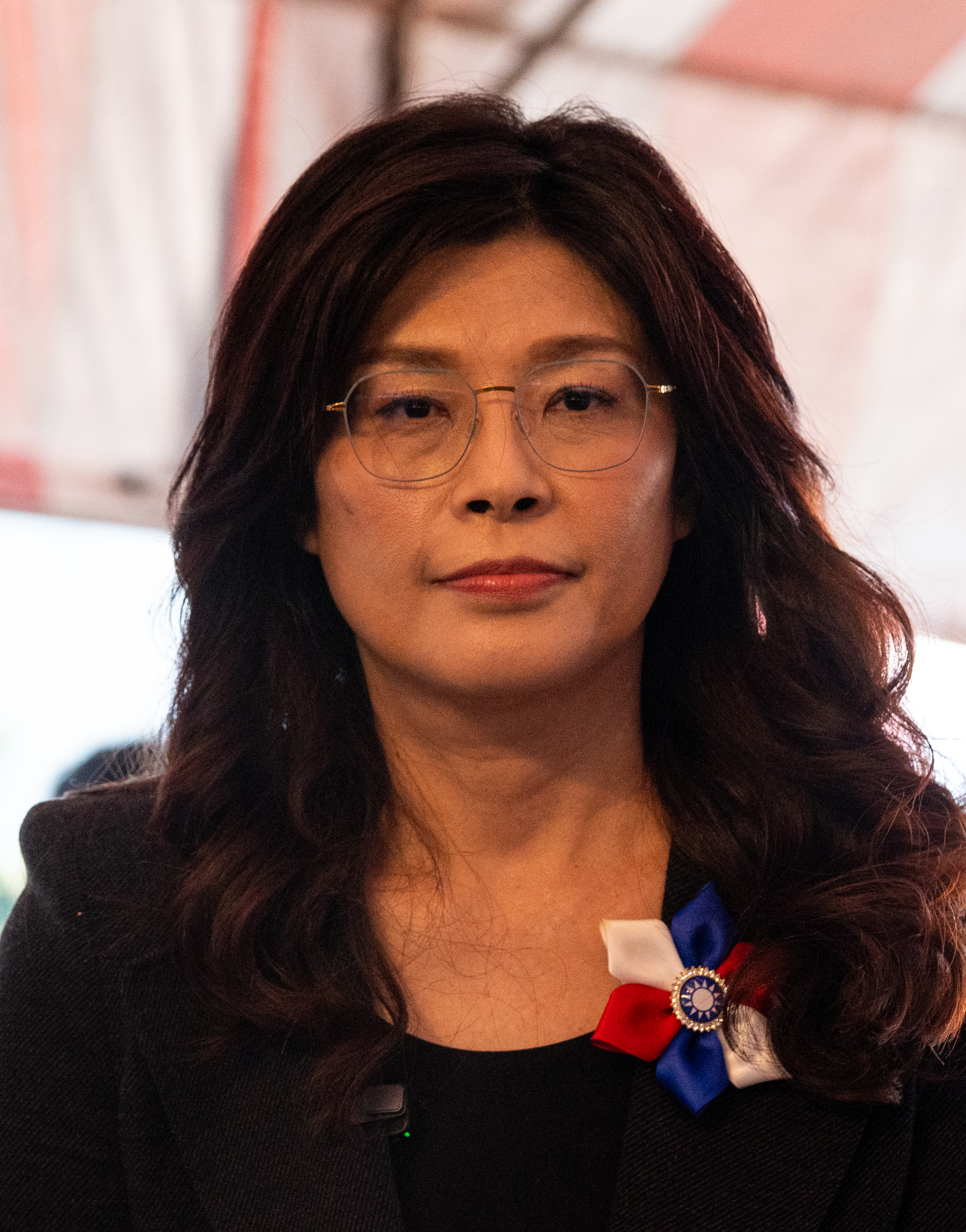

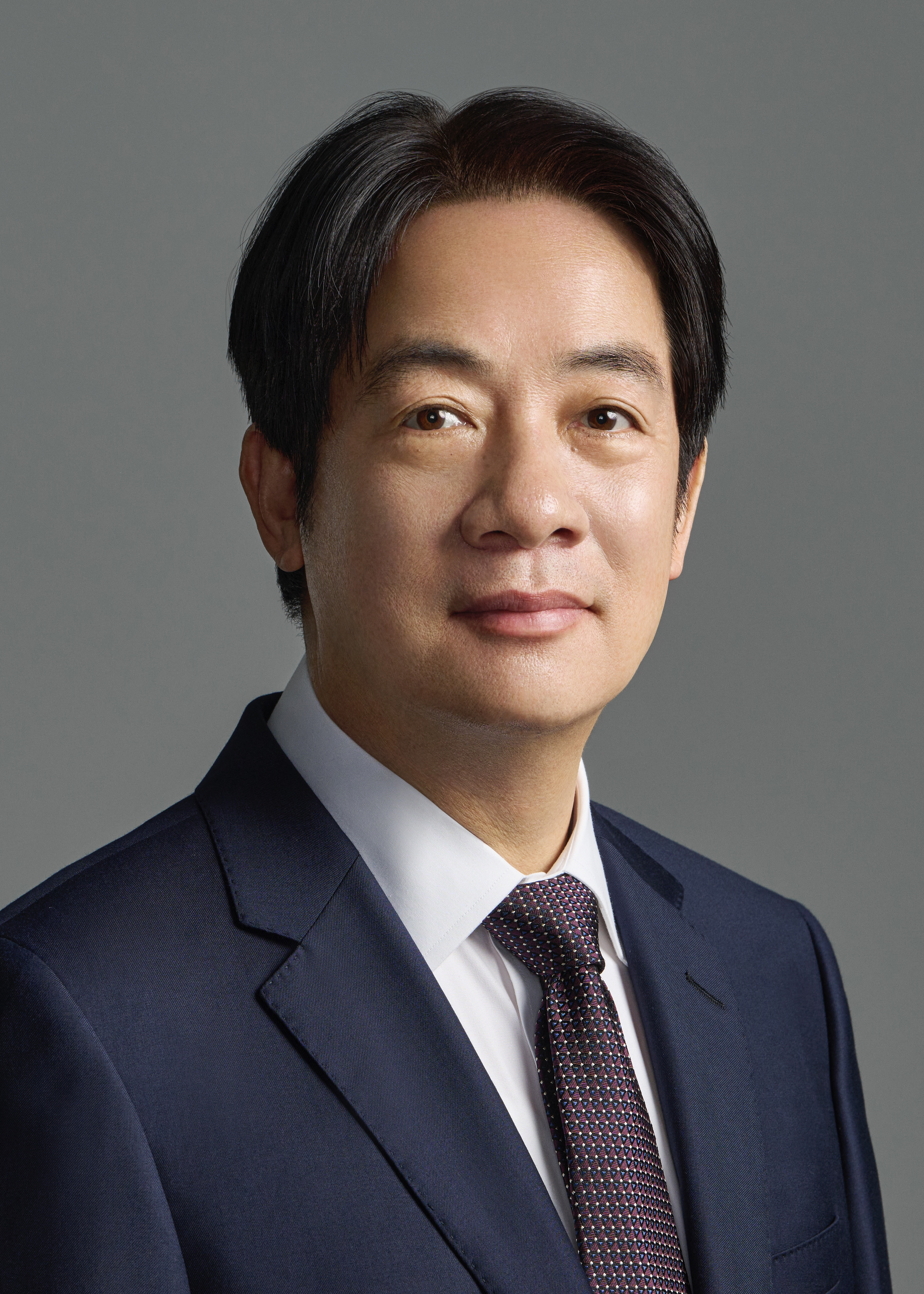

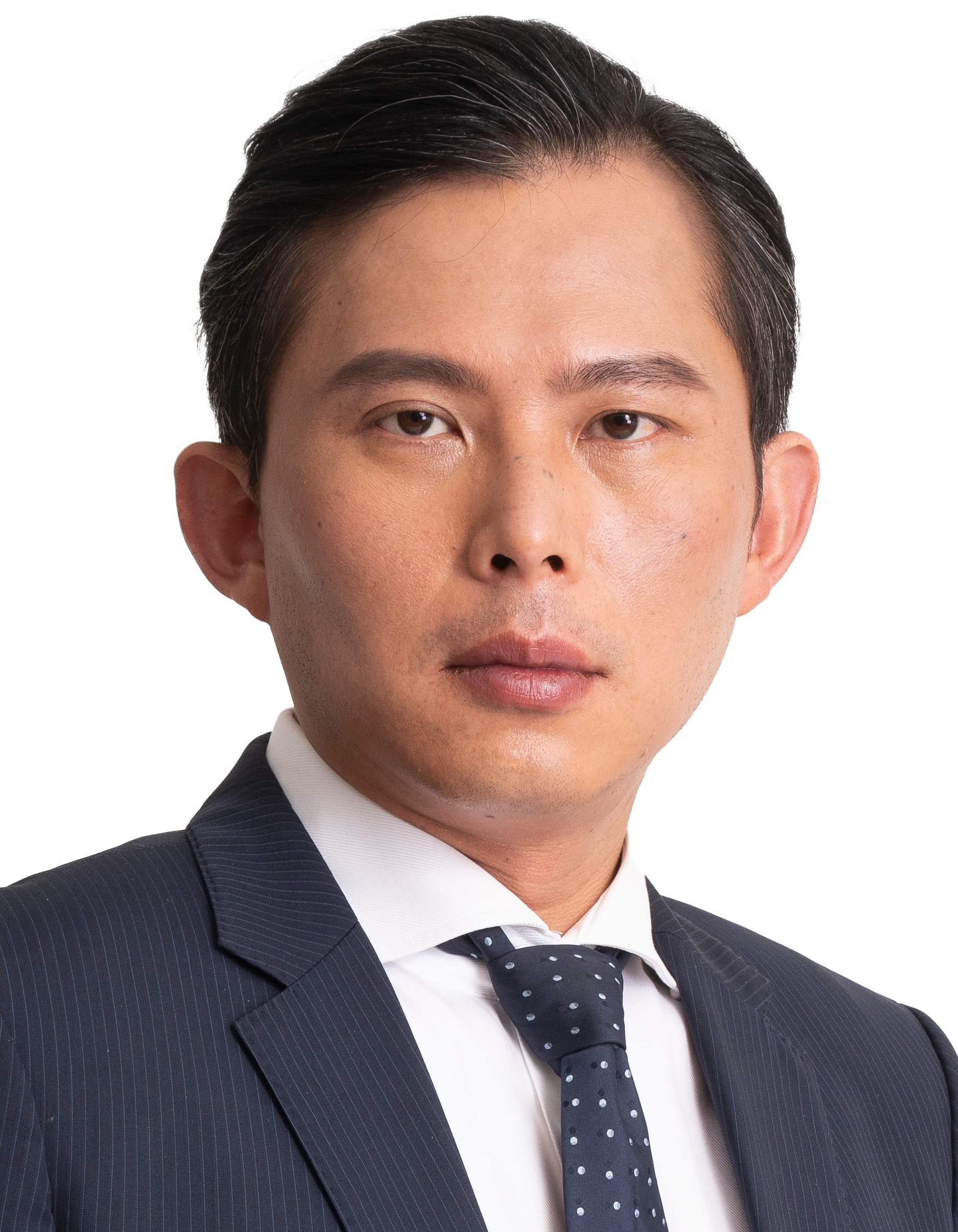
Leader	Cheng Li-wun	Lai Ching-te	Huang Kuo-chang
Party	KMT	DPP	TPP
Leader since	1 November 2025	18 January 2023	1 January 2025
Last election	14 seats, 50.1%	5 seats, 41.6%	2 seats, 4.7%
Current seats	14	5	1 (Note: Ann Kao was elected Mayor of Hsinchu in 2022, and withdrew from the party when she was suspended from office in 2024. She did not resume her TPP membership when she returned to office in 2025.)
- Taiwan by administrative divisions

Local elections will be held in Taiwan on 28 November 2026 to elect county magistrates and city mayors, county and city councilors, township mayors, township councilors and chiefs of villages and boroughs in six special municipalities and 16 counties and cities. Elected officials will serve a four-year term.

== Background ==
The 2026 local elections will take place just over two years after the 2024 Taiwanese presidential election and the 2024 Taiwanese legislative elections.

In the presidential election, Democratic Progressive Party (DPP) Vice President Lai Ching-te won the presidency after two-term President Tsai Ing-wen, also of the DPP, was term-limited. Lai thus secured a third term in the Presidential Office for the DPP.

Kuomintang (KMT) Hou Yu-ih candidate came second, while former Taipei Mayor Ko Wen-je, of the Taiwan People's Party (TPP), came third.

However, the center-left, pro-Taiwanese independence DPP lost its absolute majority in the Legislative Yuan in the legislative elections. Both the DPP and the opposition right-wing, pro-Chinese unification KMT failed to win a majority, leaving the populist, centrist TPP to hold the balance of power.

The first two years of Lai's administration have seen his premier, Cho Jung-tai, refuse to countersign laws passed by a majority of the Legislative Yuan.

A mass recall of KMT lawmakers was also attempted, but failed to result in changing the balance of power in the Legislative Yuan with no KMT legislator lost their seats.

The People's Republic of China sees Lai as a separatist "troublemaker". KMT chairperson Cheng Li-wun made a high-profile trip to China, meeting with mainland leader Xi Jinping and said that "rejuvenation of the Chinese people is a shared aspiration of the people on both sides of the Strait".

Although the 2026 Taiwanese local elections will not elect national candidates, they will give parties an insight into their respective strengths and weaknesses going into the 2028 Taiwanese presidential elections as well as the next legislative elections.

== Candidate selection and alliance building ==
=== Kuomintang ===
The KMT held its leadership election in October 2025. During her campaign, winning candidate Cheng Li-wun indicated she would continue the KMT–TPP coalition, respect local decisions about candidacies and back incumbents for reelection. If the TPP and the KMT nominated candidates for the same local office, a cross-party primary would be held to determine the candidate. Public discussions about an electoral coalition between the two parties began in November 2025. The KMT nomination in Hualien County was contested by several party members and aligned independents who sought to end Fu Kun-chi's influence in the area.

=== Democratic Progressive Party ===
The DPP discussed candidate nomination procedures for the 2026 elections at the party congress held in June 2025.

=== Taiwan People's Party ===
On 28 December 2025, TPP chairman Huang Kuo-chang formally announced his candidacy for the New Taipei mayoralty. In January 2026, the TPP published a white paper describing party policies for the 2026 elections. Huang suspended his New Taipei mayoral campaign in April 2026, as Lee Shu-chuan became the joint candidate of the KMT and TPP. The TPP announced in September 2026 that its partnership with the KMT had ended for political offices in Hsinchu County, as the parties could not agree on a joint mayoral candidate for Zhubei.

=== Other parties ===
On 9 September 2025, the New Power Party, Taiwan Statebuilding Party, Taiwan Obasang Political Equality Party and Green Party Taiwan announced that their leaders, Claire Wang, Wang Hsing-huan, Lin Shih-han, and Joyance Wang, respectively, had formed an electoral coalition for the local election. The coalition was formally branded as the Taiwan Go Go alliance in December 2025. In January 2026, the Taiwan Go Go alliance announced a candidate recruitment drive for all seats on the Taipei City Council.

== Election security ==
On 14 October 2025, the National Security Bureau reported to the legislature that election security measures had entered the planning stage, earlier than in previous election cycles. On 31 October 2025, the Central Election Commission formally scheduled the elections for 28 November 2026. On 20 August 2026, the CEC calculated that 11,051 local public officials would be elected across 18,244 polling stations in 8,906 electoral districts. The electorate was estimated at 19.65 million people, with 600,000 first-time voters. The Ministry of Justice Investigation Bureau reported on 8 September 2026 that 54 investigations had been conducted into suspected foreign election interference and other instances of possible electoral fraud. The High Prosecutors Office separately tracked over 200 illicit financial transactions connected to potential election interference.

== Electoral system ==
Nine categories of local public officials are to be elected in this election cycle: mayors of special municipalities, special municipality councilors, county magistrates and city mayors, county and city councilors, township and county-administered city mayors, township and city councilors, chiefs of indigenous districts in special municipalities, councilors of indigenous districts in special municipalities, and chiefs of villages and boroughs.

Election day is set for 28 November 2026, or the 28th day, 11th month, and 115th year of the Republic of China calendar.

The Central Election Commission estimated that 11,032 local public officials would be elected across 8,906 electoral districts, with approximately 19.65 million eligible voters. The commission planned to establish 18,244 polling stations for the election.

Local executive heads, including mayors and county magistrates, are elected directly by voters. Local councilors are elected in multi-member electoral districts, in which the candidates receiving the most votes win the available seats. The election also includes township- and district-level offices and village and borough chiefs. The specific electoral arrangements depend on the office being contested.

City mayors and county magistrates are subject to term limits: They may serve no more than two consecutive terms in office.

== Election timetable ==
The Central Election Commission set the following schedule for the elections. All dates are in 2026 unless otherwise stated.

Election administration schedule
Date	Event
20 August	Election notice issued (100 days before polling day)
27 August	Announcement of candidate registration dates and requirements
31 August – 4 September	Candidate registration
4 September	Deadline for political parties to withdraw their endorsement of candidates
By 16 October	Candidate lists reviewed and approved; candidates notified of the ballot draw
23 October	Drawing of lots to determine candidates' ballot numbers
8 November	Electoral rolls completed
12 November	Announcement of candidate lists for special municipality mayors
13–27 November	Official policy presentations for special municipality mayoral candidates
17 November	Announcement of candidate lists for special municipality councilors, county magistrates and city mayors, and county and city councilors
18–27 November	Official policy presentations for special municipality councilor, county magistrate and city mayor, and county and city councilor candidates
By 24 November	Announcement of the number of eligible voters
28 November	Polling day; votes cast and counted
By 4 December	List of elected candidates reviewed and approved
4 December	Announcement of elected candidates
18 December	Certificates of election issued
25 December	Elected officials sworn in
By 3 January 2027	Candidates notified to collect campaign expense subsidies

== Political parties ==
The table below lists the parties that hold seats in the Legislative Yuan or won local council seats in the 2022 local elections. Party competition in Taiwan is structured mainly around national identity and cross-strait relations rather than a strict left–right economic divide, with parties conventionally grouped into the pan-Blue and pan-Green camps.

Many candidates for local office, particularly village and borough chiefs, stand as independents.

Parties contesting the 2026 local elections
Party	Leader	Position	Cross-strait position	Ideology	Legislative Yuan seats	Mayors and Magistrates	City/county council seats
Kuomintang (KMT)	Cheng Li-wun	Center-right to right-wing	Pan-Blue; favors closer cross-strait ties and opposes Taiwanese independence	Conservatism; Chinese nationalism Three Principles of the People	53 / 113	15 / 22	355 / 910
Democratic Progressive Party (DPP)	Lai Ching-te	Center to center-left	Pan-Green; upholds Taiwanese sovereignty and rejects the one-China principle	Taiwanese nationalism Progressivism; Social liberalism	51 / 113	5 / 22	274 / 910
Non-Partisan Solidarity Union (NPSU)	Lin Pin-kuan	Center to center-right	Pan-Blue leaning	Localism; Big tent	0 / 113	0 / 22	35 / 910
Taiwan People's Party (TPP)	Huang Kuo-chang	Center left to center right	Presents itself as a middle path; in electoral cooperation with the KMT	Populism; Pragmatism; Reformism	8 / 113	0 / 22	15 / 910
New Power Party (NPP)	Claire Wang	Center-left to left-wing	Pan-Green leaning; supports Taiwanese independence	Progressivism; Taiwanese nationalism	0 / 113	0 / 22	5 / 910
Taiwan Solidarity Party (TSU)		Right-wing	Pan-Green; supports Taiwanese independence	Taiwanese nationalism Conservatism	0 / 113	0 / 22	3 / 910
Taiwan Statebuilding Party (TSP)	Wang Hsing-huan	Left-wing	Pan-Green; advocates formal Taiwanese independence	Taiwanese nationalism Progressivism	0 / 113	0 / 22	2 / 910
Labor Party		Left-wing	Supports Chinese unification	Socialism	0 / 113	0 / 22	1 / 910
New Party	Wu Cheng-tien	Right-wing	Pan-Blue; supports Chinese unification	Chinese nationalism National conservatism	0 / 113	0 / 22	1 / 910
People First Party (PFP)	James Soong	Center-right	Pan-Blue; opposes Taiwanese independence	Liberal conservatism Chinese nationalism	0 / 113	0 / 22	1 / 910
Social Democratic Party (SDP)		Center-left	Pan-Green leaning	Social democracy Progressivism	0 / 113	0 / 22	1 / 910
Zheng Shen Min Party		Center	None	Centrism	0 / 113	0 / 22	1 / 910
Green Party Taiwan		Center-left to left-wing	Pan-Green leaning	Green politics Progressivism	0 / 113	0 / 22	0 / 910
Non-partisan					1 / 113	2 / 22	227 / 910

In addition to the party-affiliated councilors listed above, there are 198 independent councilors.

== Party alliances ==
=== KMT–TPP cooperation ===
The KMT and the TPP reached an agreement in March 2026 to coordinate candidates and cooperate on policy positions in the local elections. Under the agreement, the parties adopted a process of nominating candidates and subsequently coordinating their candidacies to support a common candidate where an agreement could be reached. The agreement also provided for joint campaigning and cooperation after the election.

The cooperation encountered difficulties in Hsinchu County, where the two parties could not agree on a candidate for mayor of Zhubei. Both parties registered candidates for the office. On 6 September 2026, the TPP announced that it would suspend electoral cooperation with the KMT in Hsinchu County following the dispute.

=== Taiwan Go Go alliance ===
In September 2025, the New Power Party, Taiwan Statebuilding Party, Taiwan Obasang Political Equality Party and Green Party Taiwan announced an agreement to cooperate in the 2026 local elections. The parties said they intended to coordinate their candidacies, including by avoiding competition between their candidates in the same electoral districts.

In December 2025, the four parties formally established the Taiwan Go Go alliance. The alliance aimed to coordinate participation in local elections and increase cooperation among smaller parties. Its stated principles included local democratic participation, social equality, environmental sustainability and transparency in politics. In late October 2026, the alliance announced that the national identification numbers of 1,573 mayoral and councilor candidates had been posted to the Central Election Commission website alongside financial disclosures. CEC chair Michael You apologized and stated that the oversight was traced to a third-party contractor affiliated with Acer Inc.

== Candidates ==
Candidate registration for the 2026 Taiwanese local elections took place from 31 August – 4 September 2026. The following candidates registered to contest the six special municipality mayoral elections and the 16 other county and city executive elections. The list is based on reporting by the Central News Agency published on 7 September 2026; registration did not necessarily establish final eligibility.

The color strips identify party affiliation. Grey is used for independent candidates. Colors assigned to smaller parties are provisional visual identifiers.

Incumbents are noted in bold.

=== Special municipality mayoral elections ===
==== Taipei ====
Candidate	Party	Background
Kuo Hsi	Taiwan Mahjong Greatest Party	Retired Navy captain and former adviser to the Navy Command
Puma Shen	Democratic Progressive Party	Legislator
Wen Hsiao	FoRmosan SoR Party	
Tang Hsin-min	Third Force Promoting Unity Alliances (TTFPUA)	
**Chiang Wan-an**	Kuomintang	Incumbent mayor
Lin Chih-cheng	Independent	

==== New Taipei ====
Candidate	Party	Background
Su Chiao-hui	Democratic Progressive Party	Legislator
Lee Shu-chuan	Kuomintang	Former Taipei deputy mayor
Su Hui-huang	Independent	

==== Taoyuan ====
Candidate	Party	Background
**Chang San-cheng**	Kuomintang	Incumbent mayor
Huang Shih-chieh	Democratic Progressive Party	Former deputy justice minister

==== Taichung ====
Candidate	Party	Background
Ho Hsin-chun	Democratic Progressive Party	Legislator
Johnny Chiang	Kuomintang	Deputy speaker of the Legislative Yuan
Hung Li-hua	Law Justice Party	

==== Tainan ====
Candidate	Party	Background
Hsiao Lin-hung	FoRmosan SoR Party	
Hsieh Lung-chieh	Kuomintang	Legislator
Yeh Jen-wen	Independent	
Chen Ting-fei	Democratic Progressive Party	Legislator

==== Kaohsiung ====
Candidate	Party	Background
Chang Ching	Judicial Revolution Party	
Lai Jui-lung	Democratic Progressive Party	Legislator
Wang Chao-min	Independent	
Ko Chih-en	Kuomintang	Legislator
Hung Fang-lung	Independent	

=== Other cities and counties ===
==== Changhua County ====
Candidate	Party	Background
Chen Chung-chia	Independent	County councillor
Chen Su-yueh	Democratic Progressive Party	Legislator
Chiu Chien-fu	Independent	Former Changhua City mayor
Wei Ping-cheng	Kuomintang	Lawyer and former director of the party's Disciplinary Committee

==== Chiayi City ====
Candidate	Party	Background
Huang Hung-chen Taiwan AChen World Great Person Rich God President	Independent	
Chen Kai-huang	Independent	Former president of Taipei National University of the Arts
Chang Chi-kai	Taiwan People's Party	Former Legislator
Wang Mei-hui	Democratic Progressive Party	Legislator
Wang Yi-cheng	Independent	

==== Chiayi County ====
Candidate	Party	Background
Wu Pin-jui	Independent	Mayor of Puzi, Chiayi
Tsai Yi-yu	Democratic Progressive Party	Legislator

==== Hsinchu City ====
Candidate	Party	Background
**Ann Kao**	Independent	Incumbent mayor
Chuang Ching-cheng	Democratic Progressive Party	Taiwan Thinktank CEO and former legislator
Ho Chih-yung	Independent	Former KMT spokesperson

==== Hsinchu County ====
Candidate	Party	Background
Cheng Chao-fang	Democratic Progressive Party	Mayor of Zhubei
Chu Ting-yu	Independent	
Hsu Hsin-ying	Kuomintang	Legislator

==== Hualien County ====
Candidate	Party	Background
Yu Shu-chen	Kuomintang	Head of Ji'an Township
Chang Chun	Independent	Hualien County Council speaker
Wei Chia-hsien	Independent	County councilor and former Hualien City mayor
Lo Pei-chin	Taiwan Labor Party	

==== Keelung City ====
Candidate	Party	Background
**George Hsieh**	Kuomintang	Incumbent mayor
Wei Tsao-wen	Independent	
Tung Tzu-wei	Democratic Progressive Party	Keelung City Council speaker

==== Kinmen County ====
Candidate	Party	Background
Hung Ho-chen	Independent	
Chen Yu-jen	Kuomintang	Legislator and head of the party's Kinmen County chapter
Lee Wen-liang	Independent	Former deputy county magistrate
Hwang Shyh-twan	Independent	Artist
Chang Kuo-wei	Independent	Entrepreneur
Leung Man-to	Independent	Professor in National Cheng Kung University's Department of Political Science
Chang Huo-mu	Independent	

==== Lienchiang County ====
Candidate	Party	Background
**Wang Chung-ming**	Kuomintang	Incumbent county magistrate
Tsao Erh-yuan	Independent	Former head of the county government's Land Administration Department

==== Miaoli County ====
Candidate	Party	Background
Chen Pin-an	Democratic Progressive Party	Miaoli County councillor
**Chung Tung-chin**	Kuomintang	Incumbent county magistrate

==== Nantou County ====
Candidate	Party	Background
Wen Shih-cheng	Democratic Progressive Party	Executive director of the New Taipei City Dental Association
**Hsu Shu-hua**	Kuomintang	Incumbent county magistrate

==== Penghu County ====
Candidate	Party	Background
Wu Shu-chin	Democratic Progressive Party	Wife of Penghu County Magistrate Chen Kuang-fu
Chen Chen-chung	Kuomintang	Former head of Huxi Township
Chou Ni-an	Taiwan Solidarity Party	Party chairwoman
Hsu Chih-fu	Independent	Former deputy county magistrate
Chen Chin-chuan	Independent	Marine conservation volunteer
Yeh Chu-lin	Independent	Former mayor of Magong

==== Pingtung County ====
Candidate	Party	Background
Su Ching-chuan	Kuomintang	Legislator and head of the party's Pingtung County chapter
**Chou Chun-mi**	Democratic Progressive Party	Incumbent county magistrate

==== Taitung County ====
Candidate	Party	Background
Chen Ying	Democratic Progressive Party	Legislator
Wu Hsiu-hua	Kuomintang	Taitung County Council speaker
Li Wu Ying-chih	Independent	
Wang Chih-wei	Independent	

==== Yilan County ====
Candidate	Party	Background
Chen Hung-yi	Independent	
Wu Tsung-hsien	Kuomintang	Legislator
Liu Tsan-hui	Independent	
Lin Kuo-chang	Democratic Progressive Party	Lawyer
Yang Yi-ting	Independent	

==== Yunlin County ====
Candidate	Party	Background
Wu Ping-hui	Independent	Lawyer
Alice Chang	Kuomintang	Legislator
Liu Chien-kuo	Democratic Progressive Party	Legislator
Lin Chia-yu	Independent	

== Results ==
The following tables use results published by the Central Election Commission (CEC).

=== Overall ===
The table below summarizes party performance in the mayoral and county magistrate elections and the local council elections.

Party	2022 Mayors and magistrates	Mayors and magistrates elected	Mayors and magistrates change	Mayors and magistrates votes	Mayors and magistrates votes share (%)	2022 Council seats	Council seats won	Council seats change	Council votes	Council vote share (%)
Kuomintang (KMT)	14					367				
Democratic Progressive Party (DPP)	5					277				
Taiwan People's Party (TPP)	2					14				
New Power Party	0	0				6				
Taiwan Solidarity Party	0	0				3				
Taiwan Statebuilding Party	0	0				2				
Other parties	0					14				
Independents	1					227				

=== Mayoral and county magistrate elections ===
The following tables list the candidates in the 22 executive races. Vote percentages are calculated as a share of valid votes cast in each constituency. Asterisks (*) and italics designate the incumbent running for reelection. Bold highlights the winner of the election.

==== Taipei ====
Candidate	Party	Votes	Vote share (%)
Kuo Hsi	Taiwan Mahjong Greatest Party		
Puma Shen	Democratic Progressive Party		
Wen Hsiao	FoRmosan SoR Party		
Tang Hsin-min	Third Force Promoting Unity Alliances		
Chiang Wan-an*	Kuomintang		
Lin Chih-cheng	Independent		

==== New Taipei ====
Candidate	Party	Votes	Vote share (%)
Su Chiao-hui	Democratic Progressive Party		
Lee Shu-chuan	Kuomintang		
Su Hui-huang	Independent		

==== Taoyuan ====
Candidate	Party	Votes	Vote share (%)
Chang San-cheng*	Kuomintang		
Huang Shih-chieh	Democratic Progressive Party		

==== Taichung ====
Candidate	Party	Votes	Vote share (%)
Ho Hsin-chun	Democratic Progressive Party		
Johnny Chiang	Kuomintang		
Hung Li-hua	Law Justice Party		

==== Tainan ====
Candidate	Party	Votes	Vote share (%)
Hsiao Lin-hung	FoRmosan SoR Party		
Hsieh Lung-chieh	Kuomintang		
Yeh Jen-wen	Independent		
Chen Ting-fei	Democratic Progressive Party		

==== Kaohsiung ====
Candidate	Party	Votes	Vote share (%)
Chang Ching	Judicial Revolution Party		
Lai Jui-lung	Democratic Progressive Party		
Wang Chao-min	Independent		
Ko Chih-en	Kuomintang		
Hung Fang-lung	Independent		

==== Keelung City ====
Candidate	Party	Votes	Vote share (%)
Hsieh Kuo-liang*	Kuomintang		
Wei Tsao-wen	Independent		
Tung Tzu-wei	Democratic Progressive Party		

==== Hsinchu City ====
Candidate	Party	Votes	Vote share (%)
Kao Hung-an*	Independent		
Chuang Ching-cheng	Democratic Progressive Party		
Ho Chih-yung	Independent		

==== Hsinchu County ====
Candidate	Party	Votes	Vote share (%)
Cheng Chao-fang	Democratic Progressive Party		
Chu Ting-yu	Independent		
Hsu Hsin-ying	Kuomintang		

==== Miaoli County ====
Candidate	Party	Votes	Vote share (%)
Chen Pin-an	Democratic Progressive Party		
Chung Tung-chin*	Kuomintang		

==== Changhua County ====
Candidate	Party	Votes	Vote share (%)
Chen Chung-chia	Independent		
Chen Su-yueh	Democratic Progressive Party		
Chiu Chien-fu	Independent		
Wei Ping-cheng	Kuomintang		

==== Nantou County ====
Candidate	Party	Votes	Vote share (%)
Wen Shih-cheng	Democratic Progressive Party		
Hsu Shu-hua*	Kuomintang		

==== Yunlin County ====
Candidate	Party	Votes	Vote share (%)
Wu Ping-hui	Independent		
Alice Chang	Kuomintang		
Liu Chien-kuo	Democratic Progressive Party		
Lin Chia-yu	Independent		

==== Chiayi City ====
Candidate	Party	Votes	Vote share (%)
Huang Hung-chen	Independent		
Chen Kai-huang	Independent		
Chang Chi-kai	Taiwan People's Party		
Wang Mei-hui	Democratic Progressive Party		
Wang Yi-cheng	Independent		

==== Chiayi County ====
Candidate	Party	Votes	Vote share (%)
Wu Pin-jui	Independent		
Tsai Yi-yu	Democratic Progressive Party		

==== Pingtung County ====
Candidate	Party	Votes	Vote share (%)
Su Ching-chuan	Kuomintang		
Chou Chun-mi*	Democratic Progressive Party		

==== Yilan County ====
Candidate	Party	Votes	Vote share (%)
Chen Hung-yi	Independent		
Wu Tsung-hsien	Kuomintang		
Liu Tsan-hui	Independent		
Lin Kuo-chang	Democratic Progressive Party		
Yang Yi-ting	Independent		

==== Taitung County ====
Candidate	Party	Votes	Vote share (%)
Chen Ying	Democratic Progressive Party		
Wu Hsiu-hua	Kuomintang		
Li Wu Ying-chih	Independent		
Wang Chih-wei	Independent		

==== Hualien County ====
Candidate	Party	Votes	Vote share (%)
Yu Shu-chen	Kuomintang		
Chang Chun	Independent		
Wei Chia-hsien	Independent		
Lo Pei-chin	Taiwan Labor Party		

==== Penghu County ====
Candidate	Party	Votes	Vote share (%)
Wu Shu-chin	Democratic Progressive Party		
Chen Chen-chung	Kuomintang		
Chou Ni-an	Taiwan Solidarity Party		
Hsu Chih-fu	Independent		
Chen Chin-chuan	Independent		
Yeh Chu-lin	Independent		

==== Kinmen County ====
Candidate	Party	Votes	Vote share (%)
Hung Ho-chen	Independent		
Chen Yu-jen	Kuomintang		
Lee Wen-liang	Independent		
Hwang Shyh-twan	Independent		
Chang Kuo-wei	Independent		
Leung Man-to	Independent		
Chang Huo-mu	Independent		

==== Lienchiang County ====
Candidate	Party	Votes	Vote share (%)
Wang Chung-ming*	Kuomintang		
Tsao Erh-yuan	Independent		

=== City and county council elections ===
Party	Seats before	Seats won	Seats change	Votes	Vote share (%)
Kuomintang (KMT)	355				
Non-Partisan Solidarity Union (NPSU)	35				
People First Party (PFP)	1				
Other pan-blue parties	2				
Total pan-blue	393				
Democratic Progressive Party (DPP)	274				
Taiwan Statebuilding Party (TSP)	2				
Taiwan Solidarity Union (TSU)	3				
New Power Party (NPP)	5				
Other pan-green parties	1				
Total pan-green	285				
Taiwan People's Party (TPP)	15				
Other parties	1				
Independents	198				

==== Taipei City Council ====
Taipei City Council is the elected council for Taipei City.

Party	Seats before	Seats won	Seats change	Votes	Vote share (%)
Kuomintang	28				
Other pan-blue parties	1 New Party				
Democratic Progressive Party	19				
Other pan-green parties	1 Social Dem				
Taiwan People's Party	4				
New Power Party					
Other parties					
Independents	1				

==== New Taipei City Council ====
New Taipei City, formerly Taipei County, comes under the purview of New Taipei City Council.

Party	Seats before	Seats won	Seats change	Votes	Vote share (%)
Kuomintang	30				
Other pan-blue parties	2 NPSU				
Democratic Progressive Party	28				
Other pan-green parties					
Taiwan People's Party	1				
New Power Party					
Other parties					
Independents	3				

==== Taoyuan City Council ====
Taoyuan City Council by party breakdown pre- and post-local elections:

Party	Seats before	Seats won	Seats change	Votes	Vote share (%)
Kuomintang	30				
Other pan-blue parties					
Democratic Progressive Party	24				
Other pan-green parties					
Taiwan People's Party					
New Power Party					
Other parties					
Independents	9				

==== Taichung City Council ====
Taichung City Council is the directly elected council for Taichung.

Party	Seats before	Seats won	Seats change	Votes	Vote share (%)
Kuomintang	32				
Other pan-blue parties					
Democratic Progressive Party	24				
Other pan-green parties					
Taiwan People's Party	1				
New Power Party					
Other parties					
Independents	7				

==== Tainan City Council ====
Tainan City Council oversees this historic southern city.

Party	Seats before	Seats won	Seats change	Votes	Vote share (%)
Kuomintang	12				
Other pan-blue parties	2 NPSU				
Democratic Progressive Party	28				
Other pan-green parties	1 TSP, 1 TSU				
Taiwan People's Party					
New Power Party					
Other parties					
Independents	13				

==== Kaohsiung City Council ====
The election results for Kaohsiung City Council are as follow:

Party	Seats before	Seats won	Seats change	Votes	Vote share (%)
Kuomintang	28				
Other pan-blue parties	3 NPSU				
Democratic Progressive Party	27				
Other pan-green parties	1 TSU, 1 TSP				
Taiwan People's Party					
New Power Party					
Other parties					
Independents	4				

==== Keelung City Council ====
Keelung City Council supervises the northern city.

Party	Seats before	Seats won	Seats change	Votes	Vote share (%)
Kuomintang	11				
Other pan-blue parties	6 NPSU, 1 PFP				
Democratic Progressive Party	12				
Other pan-green parties					
Taiwan People's Party					
Other parties					
Independents					

==== Hsinchu City Council ====
Hsinchu City Council's election results:

Party	Seats before	Seats won	Seats change	Votes	Vote share (%)
Kuomintang	14				
Other pan-blue parties					
Democratic Progressive Party	8				
Other pan-green parties	3 NPP				
Taiwan People's Party	2				
Other parties					
Independents	7				

==== Hsinchu County Council ====
The area outside of Hsinchu City is overseen by Hsinchu County Council, whose party breakdown is as follows:

Party	Seats before	Seats won	Seats change	Votes	Vote share (%)
Kuomintang	20				
Other pan-blue parties	1 Labor Party				
Democratic Progressive Party	6				
Other pan-green parties					
Taiwan People's Party	1				
Other parties					
Independents	8				

==== Miaoli County Council ====
Below are the election results for Miaoli County Council:

Party	Seats before	Seats won	Seats change	Votes	Vote share (%)
Kuomintang	9				
Other pan-blue parties					
Democratic Progressive Party	7				
Other pan-green parties	1 NPP				
Taiwan People's Party					
Other parties					
Independents	20				

==== Changhua County Council ====
Here are the results of the local election to Changhua County Council:

Party	Seats before	Seats won	Seats change	Votes	Vote share (%)
Kuomintang	24				
Other pan-blue parties					
Democratic Progressive Party	17				
Other pan-green parties					
Taiwan People's Party	2				
Other parties					
Independents	10				

==== Nantou County Council ====
Nantou County Council oversees Taiwan's only landlocked county.

Party	Seats before	Seats won	Seats change	Votes	Vote share (%)
Kuomintang	12				
Other pan-blue parties					
Democratic Progressive Party	7				
Other pan-green parties					
Taiwan People's Party	1				
Other parties					
Independents	16				

==== Yunlin County Council ====
Here are the election results for Yunlin County Council:

Party	Seats before	Seats won	Seats change	Votes	Vote share (%)
Kuomintang	9				
Other pan-blue parties					
Democratic Progressive Party	11				
Other pan-green parties	1 TSU				
Taiwan People's Party	1				
Other parties					
Independents	21				

==== Chiayi City Council ====
Chiayi City Council's election saw the following results:

Party	Seats before	Seats won	Seats change	Votes	Vote share (%)
Kuomintang	7				
Other pan-blue parties					
Democratic Progressive Party	4				
Other pan-green parties	1 NPP				
Taiwan People's Party					
Other parties					
Independents	10				

==== Chiayi County Council ====
Here are the results for Chiayi County Council:

Party	Seats before	Seats won	Seats change	Votes	Vote share (%)
Kuomintang	8				
Other pan-blue parties	11 NPSU				
Democratic Progressive Party	18				
Other pan-green parties					
Taiwan People's Party					
Other parties					
Independents					

==== Pingtung County Council ====
The election results for Taiwan's southernmost county, Pingtung County Council:

Party	Seats before	Seats won	Seats change	Votes	Vote share (%)
Kuomintang	19				
Other pan-blue parties					
Democratic Progressive Party	14				
Other pan-green parties					
Taiwan People's Party					
Other parties					
Independents	22				

==== Yilan County Council ====
Here are the results of Yilan County Council's local election:

Party	Seats before	Seats won	Seats change	Votes	Vote share (%)
Kuomintang	13				
Other pan-blue parties					
Democratic Progressive Party	11				
Other pan-green parties					
Taiwan People's Party					
Other parties	1 Zheng Shen Min				
Independents	10				

==== Taitung County Council ====
Underneath are the local election results for Taitung County Council:

Party	Seats before	Seats won	Seats change	Votes	Vote share (%)
Kuomintang	18				
Other pan-blue parties	8 NPSU				
Democratic Progressive Party	2				
Other pan-green parties					
Taiwan People's Party	1				
Other parties					
Independents					

==== Hualien County Council ====
The results of the election in the eastern county of Hualien County Council are as follow:

Party	Seats before	Seats won	Seats change	Votes	Vote share (%)
Kuomintang	13				
Other pan-blue parties					
Democratic Progressive Party	3				
Other pan-green parties					
Taiwan People's Party	1				
Other parties					
Independents	15				

==== Penghu County Council ====
Penghu County Council oversees the island county west of Tainan:

Party	Seats before	Seats won	Seats change	Votes	Vote share (%)
Kuomintang	4				
Other pan-blue parties	1 NPSU				
Democratic Progressive Party	3				
Other pan-green parties					
Taiwan People's Party					
Other parties					
Independents	11				

==== Kinmen County Council ====
Kinmen County Council controls this county—formally a part of Fuchien Province–mere meters away from China.

Party	Seats before	Seats won	Seats change	Votes	Vote share (%)
Kuomintang	7				
Other pan-blue parties					
Democratic Progressive Party	1				
Other pan-green parties					
Taiwan People's Party					
Other parties					
Independents	11				

==== Lienchiang County Council ====
Lienchiang County Council controls Taiwan's other Fuchien Province county, more commonly known as the Matsu Islands.

Party	Seats before	Seats won	Seats change	Votes	Vote share (%)
Kuomintang	7				
Other pan-blue parties	2 NPSU				
Democratic Progressive Party					
Other pan-green parties					
Taiwan People's Party					
Other parties					
Independents					
