= 2014 Taiwanese local elections =

- 29 November 2014

22 magistrates/mayors and others (Note: 907 councillors; 204 township/city mayors and indigenous district chief administrators; 2,146 township/city council representatives; 7,849 village chiefs; Figures in this infobox are for magistrate/mayor elections unless otherwise noted. Special municipalities are counted with counties/cities despite being counted separately in official statistics)
- Registered: 18,511,356
- Turnout: 66.31% (Note: Special municipalities; turnout for counties and cities was 70.40%.)
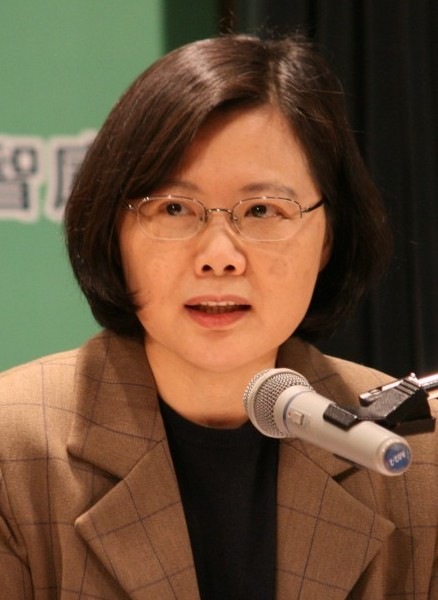

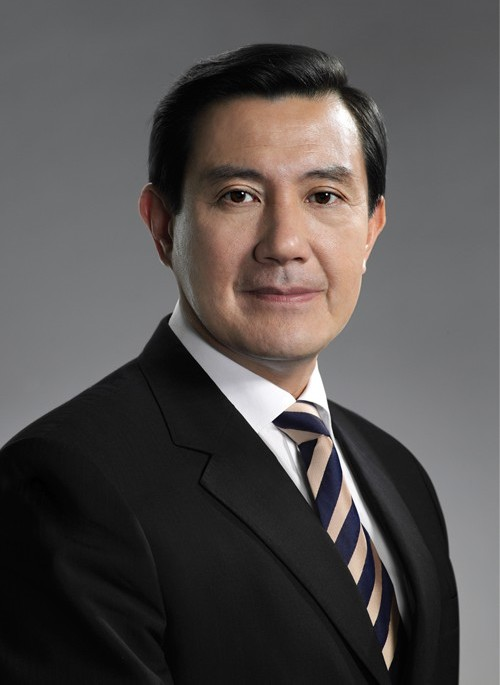
	First party	Second party
Leader	Tsai Ing-wen	Ma Ying-jeou
Party	DPP	KMT
Leader since	28 May 2014	17 October 2009
Seats won	13	6
Popular vote	3,979,329 (Note: Special municipalities; vote count for counties and cities was 1,850,777.)	3,385,081 (Note: Special municipalities; vote count for counties and cities was 1,605,596.)
Percentage	47.97% (Note: Special municipalities; percentage for counties and cities was 46.66%.)	40.81% (Note: Special municipalities; percentage for counties and cities was 40.48%.)
Special municipality councillors	167	151
County/city councillors	124	235
Township/city mayors	54	77
- KMT hold DPP hold IND hold KMT gain DPP gain IND gain

The Taiwanese local elections of 2014, commonly known as the nine-in-one elections (Chinese: 九合一選擧), were held on Saturday, 29 November 2014, to elect the Municipal Mayors, Municipal Councilors, Chiefs of indigenous districts in municipalities, Councilors of indigenous districts in municipalities, County Magistrates (City Mayors), County (City) Councilors, Township Chiefs, Township Councilors and chiefs of village (borough) in 6 municipalities and 16 counties (cities). Elected officials would serve a four-year term. Polling stations were open from 08:00 to 16:00 on the election day.

The elections resulted in a substantial defeat for the KMT. The KMT previously held 14 of 22 municipalities and counties, but won only 6 in this election due to widespread public distrust, a de facto vote of no confidence to President Ma's Administration, both politically due to Ma's cross strait relations with the Chinese Communist Party), and economically with respect to social and income inequality. The DPP gained executive control of 7 municipalities and counties from the KMT, while independent Ko Wen-je won the Taipei mayoral election. Premier Jiang Yi-huah resigned after the election, forcing President Ma Ying-jeou to appoint Mao Chi-kuo to replace Jiang. President Ma resigned from his post as Chairperson of the Chinese Nationalist Party (KMT) in the days following the election.

As five elected leaders were incumbent legislators, a subsequent legislative by-election was held in March 2015, in which there were no party swings.

== Results summary ==
Elected magistrates/mayors and council composition in the 2014 Taiwanese local election
Subdivision	Magistrate/mayor		Council				
Subdivision	Magistrate/mayor		First party	Seats (Note: Bold figures indicate majority)	Second party	Seats	Total seats
New Taipei City		Eric Chu	DPP	32	Kuomintang	26	66
Taipei City		Ko Wen-je	Kuomintang	28	DPP	27	63
Taoyuan City	Mayor Cheng Wen-tsan	Cheng Wen-tsan	Kuomintang	29	DPP	20	60
Taichung City		Lin Chia-lung	Kuomintang	28	DPP	27	63
Tainan City		Lai Ching-te	DPP	28	Kuomintang	16	57
Kaohsiung City		Chen Chu	DPP	33	Kuomintang	24	66
Yilan County		Lin Tsung-hsien	DPP	12	Kuomintang	11	34
Hsinchu County		Chiu Ching-chun	Kuomintang	23	DPP	2	36
Miaoli County	Magistrate Hsu Yao-chang	Hsu Yao-chang	Kuomintang	19	DPP	4	38
Changhua County		Wei Ming-ku	Kuomintang	24	DPP	17	54
Nantou County	Magistrate Lin Ming-chen	Lin Ming-chen	Kuomintang	17	DPP	8	37
Yunlin County		Lee Chin-yung	DPP	13	Kuomintang	7	43
Chiayi County		Helen Chang	DPP	18	Kuomintang	9	37
Pingtung County	Magistrate Pan Men-an	Pan Men-an	Kuomintang	19	DPP	18	55
Taitung County		Justin Huang	Kuomintang	22	DPP	1	30
Hualien County		Fu Kun-chi	Kuomintang	20	DPP	6	33
Penghu County		Chen Kuang-fu	Kuomintang	8	DPP	2	19
Keelung City	Magistrate Lin Yu-chang	Lin Yu-chang	Kuomintang	14	DPP	10	31
Hsinchu City	Magistrate Lin Chih-chien	Lin Chih-chien	Kuomintang	15	DPP	7	33
Chiayi City		Twu Shiing-jer	Kuomintang	6	DPP	5	24
Kinmen County		Chen Fu-hai	Kuomintang	15	DPP	1	19
Lienchiang County	Magistrate Liu Cheng-ying	Liu Cheng-ying	Kuomintang	6	None	—N/a	9

== Magistrate and mayor elections ==
Subdivision	Electorate	Turnout (%)	Winner			Runner-up			Map
Subdivision	Electorate	Turnout (%)	Name	Votes	%	Name	Votes	%	Map
New Taipei City	3,156,402	61.65	Eric Chu	959,302	50.06	Yu Shyi-kun	934,774	48.78	
Taipei City	2,146,939	70.46	Ko Wen-je	853,983	57.16	Sean Lien	609,932	40.82	
Taoyuan City	1,568,713	62.73	Cheng Wen-tsan	492,414	51.00	John Wu	463,133	47.97	
Taichung City	2,093,689	71.93	Lin Chia-lung	847,284	57.06	Jason Hu	637,531	42.94	
Tainan City	1,512,778	65.88	Lai Ching-te	711,557	72.90	Huang Hsiu-shuang	264,536	27.10	
Kaohsiung City	2,231,225	66.44	Chen Chu	993,300	68.09	Yang Chiu-hsing	450,647	30.89	
Yilan County	365,138	70.46	Lin Tsung-hsien	160,253	63.95	Chiou Shu-ti	90,320	36.05	
Hsinchu County	403,173	68.76	Chiu Ching-chun	124,309	46.94	Cheng Yung-chin	118,698	44.82	
Miaoli County	446,182	72.80	Hsu Yao-chang	147,547	46.59	Wu Yi-chen	89,838	28.37	
Changhua County	1,015,804	72.93	Wei Ming-ku	386,405	53.71	Lin Tsang-min	284,738	39.58	
Nantou County	414,091	73.11	Lin Ming-chen	149,361	50.96	Lee Wen-chung	143,719	49.04	
Yunlin County	565,557	74.09	Lee Chin-yung	232,900	56.98	Chang Li-shan	175,862	43.02	
Chiayi County	430,505	74.19	Helen Chang	193,399	63.09	Won Chung-chun	104,488	34.09	
Pingtung County	686,810	73.53	Pan Men-an	308,953	62.93	Chien Tai-lang	182,027	37.07	
Taitung County	179,015	67.82	Justin Huang	64,272	54.41	Liu Chao-hao	53,860	45.59	
Hualien County	265,571	61.77	Fu Kun-chi	89,048	56.53	Tsai Chi-ta	43,504	27.62	
Penghu County	82,269	66.27	Chen Kuang-fu	29,164	55.34	Su Kun-hsiung	23,533	44.66	
Keelung City	303,329	63.92	Lin Yu-chang	101,010	53.15	Hsieh Li-kung	52,198	27.47	
Hsinchu City	322,472	62.90	Lin Chih-chien	76,578	38.36	Hsu Ming-tsai	75,564	37.85	
Chiayi City	208,099	70.96	Twu Shiing-jer	74,698	51.41	Chen Yi-chen	66,108	45.50	
Kinmen County	103,555	45.15	Chen Fu-hai	23,965	52.77	Lee Wo-shih	15,146	33.35	
Lienchiang County	10,040	67.05	Liu Cheng-ying	4,385	66.25	Yang Sui-sheng	2,234	33.75	

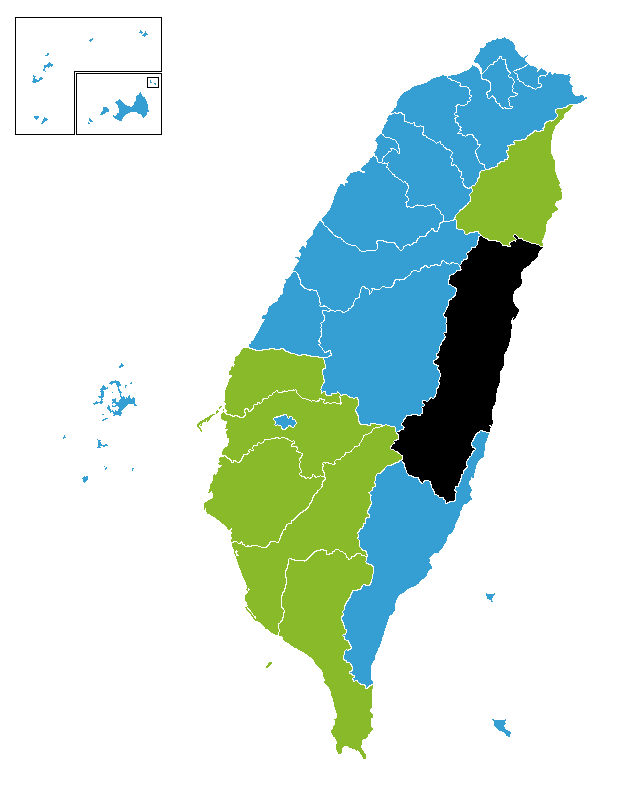
Incumbents for mayoral and county magistrate offices before the 2014 elections. Kuomintang Democratic Progressive Party Independent

Township level results of the 2014 mayoral and county magistrates elections

=== New Taipei ===
New Taipei
No.	Candidate	Party	Votes	Percentage
1	Yu Shyi-kun (游錫堃)	DPP	934,774	48.78%
2	Li Chin-shun (李進順)	Independent	22,207	1.16%
3	Eric Chu (朱立倫)	KMT	959,302	50.06%

=== Taipei ===
Taipei
No.	Candidate	Party	Votes	Percentage
1	Chen Ju-pin (陳汝斌)	Self Help Party	1,624	0.11%
2	Chao Yen-ching (趙衍慶)	Independent	15,898	1.06%
3	Lee Hong-hsin (李宏信)	Independent	2,621	0.18%
4	Yong C. Chen (陳永昌)	Independent	1,908	0.13%
5	Neil Peng (馮光遠)	Independent	8,080	0.54%
6	Sean Lien (連勝文)	KMT	609,932	40.82%
7	Ko Wen-je (柯文哲)	Independent	853,983	57.16%

=== Taoyuan ===
Taoyuan
No.	Candidate	Party	Votes	Percentage
1	Cheng Wen-tsan (鄭文燦)	DPP	492,414	51.00%
2	John Wu (吳志揚)	KMT	463,133	47.97%
3	Hsu Jiu-chih (許睿智)	Independent	9,943	1.03%

=== Taichung ===
Taichung
No.	Candidate	Party	Votes	Percentage
1	Jason Hu (胡志強)	KMT	637,531	42.94%
2	Lin Chia-lung (林佳龍)	DPP	847,284	57.06%

=== Tainan ===
Tainan
No.	Candidate	Party	Votes	Percentage
1	William Lai (賴清德)	DPP	711,557	72.90%
2	Huang Hsiu-shuang (黃秀霜)	KMT	264,536	27.10%

=== Kaohsiung ===
Kaohsiung
No.	Candidate	Party	Votes	Percentage
1	Chou Ko-sheng (周可盛)	Independent	14,925	1.02%
2	Chen Chu (陳菊)	DPP	993,300	68.09%
3	Yang Chiu-hsing (楊秋興)	KMT	450,647	30.89%

=== Yilan County ===
Yilan County
No.	Candidate	Party	Votes	Percentage
1	Lin Tsung-hsien (林聰賢)	DPP	160,253	63.95%
2	Chiou Shu-ti (邱淑媞)	KMT	90,320	36.05%

=== Hsinchu County ===
Hsinchu County
No.	Candidate	Party	Votes	Percentage
1	Yeh Fang-tung (葉芳棟)	Independent	15,699	5.93%
2	Chiu Ching-chun (邱鏡淳)	KMT	124,309	46.94%
3	Cheng Yung-chin (鄭永金)	Independent	118,698	44.82%
4	Chuang Tso-bin (莊作兵)	Independent	6,115	2.31%

=== Miaoli County ===
Miaoli County
No.	Candidate	Party	Votes	Percentage
1	Hsu Yao-chang (徐耀昌)	KMT	147,547	46.59%
2	Kang Shi-ru (康世儒)	Independent	60,356	19.06%
3	Jiang Ming-xiu (江明修)	Independent	14,978	4.73%
4	Chen Shu-fen (陳淑芬)	Independent	2,137	0.67%
5	Zeng Guo-liang (曾國良)	Independent	1,807	0.57%
6	Wu Yi-chen (吳宜臻)	DPP	89,838	28.37%

=== Changhua County ===
Changhua County
No.	Candidate	Party	Votes	Percentage
1	Huang Wen-ling (黃文玲)	Independent	37,593	5.23%
2	Hung Min-hsiung (洪敏雄)	Independent	10,674	1.48%
3	Wei Ming-ku (魏明谷)	DPP	386,405	53.71%
4	Lin Tsang-min (林滄敏)	KMT	284,738	39.58%

=== Nantou County ===
Nantou County
No.	Candidate	Party	Votes	Percentage
1	Lee Wen-chung (李文忠)	DPP	143,719	49.04%
2	Lin Ming-chen (林明溱)	KMT	149,361	50.96%

=== Yunlin County ===
Yunlin County
No.	Candidate	Party	Votes	Percentage
1	Chang Li-shan (張麗善)	KMT	175,862	43.02%
2	Lee Chin-yung (李進勇)	DPP	232,900	56.98%

=== Chiayi County ===
Chiayi County
No.	Candidate	Party	Votes	Percentage
1	Huang Hong-cheng (黃宏成)	Independent	8,639	2.82%
2	Helen Chang (張花冠)	DPP	193,399	63.09%
3	Won Chung-chun (翁重鈞)	KMT	104,488	34.09%

=== Taitung County ===
Taitung County
No.	Candidate	Party	Votes	Percentage
1	Liu Chao-hao (劉櫂豪)	DPP	53,860	45.59%
2	Justin Huang (黃健庭)	KMT	64,272	54.41%

=== Pingtung County ===
Pingtung County
No.	Candidate	Party	Votes	Percentage
1	Chien Tai-lang (簡太郎)	KMT	182,027	37.07%
2	Pan Men-an (潘孟安)	DPP	308,953	62.93%

=== Hualien County ===
Hualien County
No.	Candidate	Party	Votes	Percentage
1	Fu Kun-chi (傅崐萁)	Independent	89,048	56.53%
2	Hsu Chen-wei (徐榛蔚)	Independent	5,436	3.45%
3	Huang Shih-peng (黄師鵬)	Independent	2,369	1.50%
4	Ke Tsi-hai (柯賜海)	Independent	14,954	9.49%
5	Chu Kuo-hua (朱國華)	Independent	2,218	1.41%
6	Tsai Chi-ta (蔡啟塔)	KMT	43,504	27.62%

=== Penghu County ===
Penghu County
No.	Candidate	Party	Votes	Percentage
1	Chen Kuang-fu (陳光復)	DPP	29,164	55.34%
2	Su Kun-hsiung (蘇崑雄)	KMT	23,533	44.66%

=== Keelung ===
Keelung
No.	Candidate	Party	Votes	Percentage
1	Hsieh Li-kung (謝立功)	KMT	52,198	27.47%
2	Huang Ching-tai (黃景泰)	Independent	30,914	16.27%
3	Lin Yu-chang (林右昌)	DPP	101,010	53.15%
4	Ho Yen-tang (何燕堂)	People's Democratic Front	1,376	0.72%
5	Wu Woo-min (吳武明)	Independent	2,023	1.06%
6	Jiang Jian-yu (江鑒育)	Independent	2,517	1.32%

=== Hsinchu ===
Hsinchu
No.	Candidate	Party	Votes	Percentage
1	Liu Cheng-hsing (劉正幸)	Independent	1,914	0.96%
2	Hsu Ming-tsai (許明財)	KMT	75,564	37.85%
3	Tsai Jen-chien (蔡仁堅)	Independent	40,480	20.28%
4	Lin Chih-chien (林智堅)	DPP	76,578	38.36%
5	Wu Shu-min (吳淑敏)	Independent	5,101	2.56%

=== Chiayi ===
Chiayi
No.	Candidate	Party	Votes	Percentage
1	Chen Xiu-li (陳秀麗)	Independent	633	0.44%
2	Chen Tai-shan (陳泰山)	Independent	786	0.54%
3	Chen Yi-chen (陳以真)	KMT	66,108	45.50%
4	Twu Shiing-jer (涂醒哲)	DPP	74,698	51.41%
5	Sheu Jia-ming (許文建)	Independent	330	0.23%
6	Lin Shi-han (林詩涵)	People Democratic Front	2,747	1.89%

=== Kinmen County ===
Kinmen County
No.	Candidate	Party	Votes	Percentage
1	Su Long-ke (蘇龍科)	Independent	470	1.03%
2	Lei You-jing (雷由靖)	Independent	132	0.29%
3	Chen Fu-hai (陳福海)	Independent	23,965	52.77%
4	Lee Wo-shih (李沃士)	KMT	15,146	33.35%
5	Wang Cheng-hua (汪成華)	The Guarantee of Educational, Scientific and Cultural Budget e-Union	403	0.89%
6	Hong Zhi-heng (洪志恒)	Independent	636	1.40%
7	Zhuang Yu-min (莊育民)	Independent	236	0.52%
8	Lin Suei-Chuan (林水泉)	Independent	240	0.53%
9	Shiu Nai-chiuan (許乃權)	Independent	3,834	8.44%
10	Yang Rong-xiang (楊榮祥)	Independent	354	0.78%

=== Lienchiang County ===
Lienchiang County
No.	Candidate	Party	Votes	Percentage
1	Liu Cheng-ying (劉增應)	KMT	4,385	66.25%
2	Yang Sui-sheng (楊綏生)	KMT	2,234	33.75%

== Councillor elections ==
The results of the 2014 Taiwan county, city and municipal councillors elections: colours indicate party with the most seats Kuomintang Democratic Progressive Party Independent

Division	KMT	DPP	TSU	PFP	NP	IND/Other	Total
Division	Seats	Seats	Seats	Seats	Seats	Seats	Total
Taipei	28	27	1	2	2	3	63
New Taipei	26	32	1			7	66
Taoyuan	29	20	1			10	60
Keelung	14	10		3		4	31
Yilan County	11	12		1		9	34
Hsinchu	15	7	1			10	33
Hsinchu County	23	2				9	36
Miaoli County	19	4				15	38
Taichung	28	27		2		6	63
Changhua County	24	17				13	54
Nantou County	17	8				11	37
Yunlin County	7	13	1			22	43
Chiayi	6	5	1			12	24
Chiayi County	9	18				10	37
Tainan	16	28	1			12	57
Kaohsiung	24	33	1	1		7	66
Taitung County	22	1				7	30
Pingtung County	19	18	1			7	55
Penghu County	8	2				9	19
Kinmen County	15	1				3	19
Lienchiang County	6					3	9
Total	386	291	9	9	2	208	907

== Township/city mayor elections ==
The results of the 2014 municipal head elections Democratic Progressive Party Kuomintang Trees Party Taiwan First Nations Party Independent District without Election

- Including Municipal Mayors, Aboriginal Rural District Chiefs, Township Chiefs

Division	KMT	DPP	IND/Other	Total
Division	Seats	Seats	Seats	Total
Changhua County	8	8	10	26
Chiayi City	none			
Chiayi County	1	13	4	18
Hsinchu City	none			
Hsinchu County	8	1	4	13
Hualien County	9	1	3	13
Kaohsiung City (Maolin, Taoyuan, Namasia)	2		1	3
Keelung City	none			
Kinmen County	6			6
Lienchiang County	4			4
Miaoli County	11		7	18
Nantou County	4	2	7	13
New Taipei (Wulai)			1	1
Penghu County	2		4	6
Pingtung County	7	10	16	33
Taichung City (Heping)	1			1
Tainan City	none			
Taipei City	none			
Taitung County	12	1	3	13
Taoyuan City (Fuxing)			1	1
Yilan County	4	6	2	12
Yunlin County	1	12	7	20
Total	82	54	70	200

== Township/city council elections ==
Division	KMT	DPP	IND/Other	Total
Division	Seats	Seats	Seats	Total
Changhua County	41	47	224	317
Chiayi City	none			
Chiayi County	18	27	148	193
Hsinchu City	none			
Hsinchu County	75	2	65	141
Hualien County	90	4	48	142
Kaohsiung City (Maolin, Taoyuan, Namasia)	5		16	21
Keelung City	none			
Kinmen County	32		13	45
Lienchiang County	17		5	22
Miaoli County	49	7	137	193
Nantou County	36	3	124	163
New Taipei City (Wulai)	1		6	7
Pingtung County	44	45	245	334
Penghu County	5	1	45	51
Taichung City (Heping)	5		6	11
Taipei City	none			
Tainan City	none			
Taitung County	63		72	136
Taoyuan City (Fuxing)	6		5	11
Yilan County	40	33	58	131
Yunlin County	12	25	194	228
Total	539	194	1411	2146

== Village chief elections ==
Division	KMT	DPP	PFP	TSU	IND/Other	Total
Division	Seats	Seats	Seats	Seats	Seats	Total
Changhua County	60	7			521	
Chiayi City	23	2			59	84
Chiayi County	18	11			328	357
Hsinchu City	29				93	122
Hsinchu County	91				100	191
Hualien County	106	1			70	177
Kaohsiung City	148	147			596	891
Keelung City	55	1			101	157
Kinmen County	34				3	37
Lienchiang County	19				3	22
Miaoli County	62				212	274
Nantou County	60	3			199	262
New Taipei City	279	36	1		715	1032
Pingtung County	51	6			407	464
Penghu County	29				67	96
Taichung City	174	31			420	625
Tainan City	71	76			605	752
Taipei City	229	50		1	175	456
Taitung County	73				74	147
Taoyuan City	142	2			351	495
Yilan County	29	11			193	233
Yunlin County	12	6			370	288
Total	1794	390	1	1	5659	7849

== See also ==
- 2016 Taiwan general election
