= Counties of Taiwan =

One of the administrative divisions of Taiwan

County (Note: In local languages: Traditional Chinese script: 縣; Mandarin Pinyin: Xiàn; Hokkien: Koān; Sixian Hakka: Yen or Yan; Matsu: Gâing)
- Counties are shown in green
- Category: Special municipalities, counties, and cities
- Location: Republic of China (Taiwan)
- Number: 13
- Populations: 13,089–1,272,939
- Areas: 29–4629 km^{2}
- Government: County government; County council
- Subdivisions: Townships/cities

Counties of Taiwan
- Traditional Chinese: 縣
- Simplified Chinese: 县
Transcriptions
Standard Mandarin
- Hanyu Pinyin: xiàn
- Wade–Giles: hsien
Southern Min
- Hokkien POJ: koān
Eastern Min
- Fuzhou BUC: gâing
Pu-Xian Min
- Hinghwa BUC: gā̤ⁿ

A county, constitutionally known as a hsien, is a de jure second-level administrative division unit in the Republic of China (Taiwan). Under the administrative structure of Taiwan, it is at the same level as a provincial city.

The counties were formerly under the jurisdiction of provinces, but the provinces were streamlined and effectively downsized to non-self-governing bodies in 1998. In 2018 all provincial governmental organs were formally abolished. Counties along with former "provincial cities" which are alternately designated as simply "Cities", are presently regarded as principal subdivisions directed by the central government of Taiwan.

== History ==
Hsien have existed since the Warring States period, and were set up nation-wide by the Qin dynasty. The number of counties in China proper gradually increased from dynasty to dynasty. As Qin Shi Huang reorganized the counties after his unification, there were about 1,000. Under the Eastern Han dynasty, the number of counties increased to above 1,000. About 1,400 existed when the Sui dynasty abolished the commandery level (郡 jùn), which was the level just above counties, and demoted some commanderies to counties. In Imperial China, the county was a significant administrative unit because it marked the lowest level of the imperial bureaucratic structure — in other words, it was the lowest level that the government reached. Government below the county level was often undertaken through informal non-bureaucratic means, varying between dynasties. The head of a county was the magistrate, who oversaw both the day-to-day operations of the county as well as civil and criminal cases. The current number of counties mostly resembled that of the later years of Qing dynasty.

The first administrative divisions named "county" (縣) was first established in 1661 by the Kingdom of Tungning. The later ruler Qing empire inherited this type of administrative divisions. With the increase of Han Chinese population in Taiwan, the number of counties also grew by time. By the end of Qing era, there were 11 counties in Taiwan. Protestant missions in China first romanized the term as hien.

Taiwan was ceded to Japan by the Treaty of Shimonoseki in 1895. The hierarchy of divisions also incorporated into the Japanese system in the period when Taiwan under Japanese rule. By September 1945, Taiwan was divided into 8 prefectures (州 and 廳).

After the retrocession to China on 25 October 1945, the prefectures were reformed into eight counties (縣) with the same name under Taiwan Province of the Republic of China. Their Roman spellings were also changed to reflect the official language shift from Japanese to Mandarin Chinese, but characters remained the same. Note that most of the Japanese prefectural cities were reformed to provincial cities and are not a part of counties.

Changes of location and names of counties in Chinese history have been a major field of research in Chinese historical geography, especially from the 1960s to the 1980s.

Changes of counties in 1945 and 1950
| Japanese prefecture (before 1945) | | County (1945–1950) | | Counties in 1950 |
| Kyūjitai | Rōmaji | Character | Wade–Giles | Counties in 1950 |
|---|---|---|---|---|
| 臺北州 | Taihoku | 臺北縣 | Taipei | Taipei, Yilan |
| 新竹州 | Shinchiku | 新竹縣 | Hsinchu | Hsinchu, Miaoli, Taoyuan |
| 臺中州 | Taichū | 臺中縣 | Taichung | Changhua, Nantou, Taichung |
| 臺南州 | Tainan | 臺南縣 | Tainan | Chiayi, Tainan, Yunlin |
| 高雄州 | Takao | 高雄縣 | Kaohsiung | Kaohsiung, Pingtung |
| 花蓮港廳 | Karenkō | 花蓮縣 | Hualien | Hualien |
| 臺東廳 | Taitō | 臺東縣 | Taitung | Taitung |
| 澎湖廳 | Hōko | 澎湖縣 | Penghu | Penghu |

In late 1949, the government of the Republic of China lost the Chinese Civil War and was relocated to Taipei, Taiwan. In 1950, the counties in Taiwan were reorganized. Counties in populous western Taiwan were split into two to three counties. This pushed the number of counties up to 16. After the war, the government only controlled a few offshore islands of mainland China. Among them are two of the 67 counties of the original Fujian Province: Kinmen and Lienchiang. The number of counties under jurisdiction, 16 in Taiwan and 2 in Fujian, remained stable until the early 1990s.

List of counties from 1955 to 2010
| Name | Chinese | Name | Chinese | Name | Chinese |
|---|---|---|---|---|---|
| Changhua | 彰化縣 | Lienchiang | 連江縣 | Tainan | 臺南縣 |
| Chiayi | 嘉義縣 | Miaoli | 苗栗縣 | Taipei | 臺北縣 |
| Hsinchu | 新竹縣 | Nantou | 南投縣 | Taitung | 臺東縣 |
| Hualien | 花蓮縣 | Penghu | 澎湖縣 | Taoyuan | 桃園縣 |
| Kaohsiung | 高雄縣 | Pingtung | 屏東縣 | Yilan | 宜蘭縣 |
| Kinmen | 金門縣 | Taichung | 臺中縣 | Yunlin | 雲林縣 |

Following the democratic reforms in the early 1990s, more proposals of administrative division reforms were widely discussed and ultimately caused some populous counties be reformed to special municipalities in the 2010 and 2014. These counties are:

- Kaohsiung County (1945–2010), now part of Kaohsiung special municipality; the county seat was at Fengshan City
- Taichung County (1945–2010), now part of Taichung special municipality; the county seat was at Fengyuan City
- Tainan County (1945–2010), now part of Tainan special municipality; the county seat was located at Xinying City
- Taipei County (1945–2010), now New Taipei special municipality; the county seat was located at Banqiao City
- Taoyuan County (1950–2014), now Taoyuan special municipality; the county seat was located at Taoyuan City (county-controlled)

Currently, the counties are established according to the Local Government Act under the supervision of the Ministry of the Interior. This act also endorses some special articles that grants counties with a population of over two million can grant some extra privileges in local autonomy that was designed for special municipalities. This type of counties are often called quasi-municipalities (準直轄市). This term applied to New Taipei and Taoyuan before they became special municipalities.

== Current counties ==
There are currently 13 counties:

| Name | Chinese | Hànyǔ Pīnyīn | Wade–Giles | Tongyòng Pinyin | Hokkien Pe̍h-ōe-jī | Hakka Pha̍k-fa-sṳ | County seat | | Province (nominal) |
|---|---|---|---|---|---|---|---|---|---|
| Changhua | 彰化縣 | Zhānghuà | Chang¹-hua⁴ | Jhanghuà | Chiang-hòa or Chiong-hòa | Chông-fa | Changhua City | 彰化市 | Taiwan Province |
| Chiayi | 嘉義縣 | Jiāyì | Chia¹-i⁴ | Jiayì | Ka-gī | Kâ-ngi | Taibao City | 太保市 | Taiwan Province |
| Hsinchu | 新竹縣 | Xīnzhú | Hsin¹-chu² | Sinjhú | Sin-tek | Sîn-chuk | Zhubei City | 竹北市 | Taiwan Province |
| Hualien | 花蓮縣 | Huālián | Hua¹-lien² | Hualián | Hoa-lian or Hoa-liân | Fâ-lièn | Hualien City | 花蓮市 | Taiwan Province |
| Kinmen | 金門縣 | Jīnmén | Chin¹-mên² | Jinmén | Kim-mn̂g | Kîm-mùn | Jincheng Township | 金城鎮 | Fujian Province |
| Lienchiang | 連江縣 | Liánjiāng | Lien²-chiang¹ | Liánjiang | Liân-kang | Lièn-kông | Nangan Township | 南竿鄉 | Fujian Province |
| Miaoli | 苗栗縣 | Miáolì | Miao²-li⁴ | Miáolì | Biâu-le̍k or Miâu-le̍k | Mèu-li̍t | Miaoli City | 苗栗市 | Taiwan Province |
| Nantou | 南投縣 | Nántóu | Nan²-tʻou² | Nántóu | Lâm-tâu | Nàm-thèu | Nantou City | 南投市 | Taiwan Province |
| Penghu | 澎湖縣 | Pénghú | Pʻêng²-hu² | Pénghú | Phîⁿ-ô͘ or Phêⁿ-ô͘ | Phàng-fù | Magong City | 馬公市 | Taiwan Province |
| Pingtung | 屏東縣 | Píngdōng | Pʻing²-tung¹ | Píngdong | Pîn-tong | Phìn-tûng | Pingtung City | 屏東市 | Taiwan Province |
| Taitung | 臺東縣 | Táidōng | Tʻai²-tung¹ | Táidong | Tâi-tang | Thòi-tûng | Taitung City | 臺東市 | Taiwan Province |
| Yilan | 宜蘭縣 | Yílán | I²-lan² | Yílán | Gî-lân | Ngì-làn | Yilan City | 宜蘭市 | Taiwan Province |
| Yunlin | 雲林縣 | Yúnlín | Yün²-lin² | Yúnlín | Hûn-lîm | Yùn-lìm | Douliu City | 斗六市 | Taiwan Province |

Under Article 9 of the Additional Articles of the Constitution of the Republic of China, regulated by the Local Government Act, each county has a government headed by an elected county magistrate and an elected county council exercising legislative functions. The governing bodies (executive and legislature) of the counties are:

| Name | Executive | | | Legislature | |
| Name | Government | Magistrates | Current Magistrate | County Council | No. of seats |
|---|---|---|---|---|---|
| Changhua | Changhua County Government | List of county magistrates of Changhua | Wang Huei-mei | Changhua County Council | 54 |
| Chiayi | Chiayi County Government | List of county magistrates of Chiayi | Weng Chang-liang | Chiayi County Council | 36 |
| Hsinchu | Hsinchu County Government | List of county magistrates of Hsinchu | Yang Wen-ke | Hsinchu County Council | 34 |
| Hualien | Hualien County Government | List of county magistrates of Hualien | Hsu Chen-wei | Hualien County Council | 33 |
| Kinmen | Kinmen County Government | List of county magistrates of Kinmen | Chen Fu-hai | Kinmen County Council | 19 |
| Lienchiang | Lienchiang County Government | List of county magistrates of Lienchiang | Wang Chung-ming | Lienchiang County Council | 9 |
| Miaoli | Miaoli County Government | List of county magistrates of Miaoli | Chung Tung-chin | Miaoli County Council | 38 |
| Nantou | Nantou County Government | List of county magistrates of Nantou | Hsu Shu-hua | Nantou County Council | 37 |
| Penghu | Penghu County Government | List of county magistrates of Penghu | Chen Kuang-fu | Penghu County Council | 19 |
| Pingtung | Pingtung County Government | List of county magistrates of Pingtung | Chou Chun-mi | Pingtung County Council | 55 |
| Taitung | Taitung County Government | List of county magistrates of Taitung | Rao Ching-ling | Taitung County Council | 30 |
| Yilan | Yilan County Government | List of county magistrates of Yilan | Lin Zi-miao | Yilan County Council | 34 |
| Yunlin | Yunlin County Government | List of county magistrates of Yunlin | Chang Li-shan | Yunlin County Council | 43 |

== See also ==
- Political divisions of Taiwan (1895–1945)
- Prefectures of Japan
- Counties of the People's Republic of China

Overview of administrative divisions of the Republic of China
Republic of China
| Free area (Note: Also known as the Taiwan area or Tai–Min area (Chinese: 臺閩地區; lit. 'Taiwan–Fujian area')) | | | | | Mainland area (Note: The mainland area consists of Mainland China, Tibet and (previously) Outer Mongolia) |
| Special municipalities (Note: Has an elected executive and an elected legislative council.) (Note: Special municipalities, cities, and county-administered cities are all called shi (Chinese: 市; lit. 'city')) | | Provinces (Note: Nominal; provincial governments have been abolished) | | | Not administered (Note: Constitutionally having the same structure as the free area, these are currently under the Chinese Communist Party control with a different structure) |
| Special municipalities | | Counties | | Autonomous municipalities (Note: Sometimes called cities (Chinese: 市) or provincial cities (Chinese: 省轄市) to distinguish them from special municipalities and county-administered cities) | Not administered |
| Districts (Note: Has an appointed district administrator for managing local affairs and carrying out tasks commissioned by superior agency.) | Mountain indigenous districts | County- administered cities | Townships (Note: There are two types of townships: rural townships or xīang (Chinese: 鄉) and urban townships or zhèn (Chinese: 鎮)) | Districts | Not administered |
| Villages (Note: Has an elected village administrator for managing local affairs and carrying out tasks commissioned by superior agency.) (Note: Villages in rural townships are known as cūn (Chinese: 村), those in other jurisdictions are known as lǐ (Chinese: 里)) | | | | | Not administered |
| Neighborhoods | | | | | Not administered |
