= 縣 =

縣 is a character for a kind of administrative division. It may refer to:

- Counties of the People's Republic of China (written in modern orthography as 县), sub-provincial administrative division
- County (Taiwan), top-level administrative division
- Hyeon, former administrative division in Korea abolished during the late Joseon dynasty
- Huyện, sub-provincial administrative unit of Vietnam
- Prefectures of Japan (written in modern orthography as 県), top-level administrative divisions
