= 2022 Taiwanese local elections =

- 26 November – 18 December 2022

22 magistrates/mayors and others (Note: 910 councillors; 204 township/city mayors and indigenous district chief administrators; 2,139 township/city council representatives; 7,748 village chiefs; Figures in this infobox are for magistrate/mayor elections unless otherwise noted. Special municipalities are counted with counties/cities despite being counted separately in official statistics)
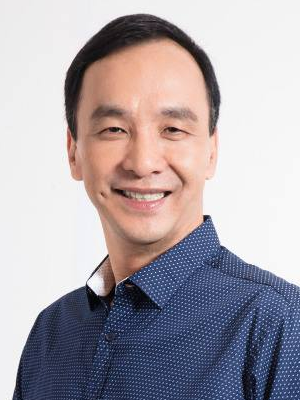

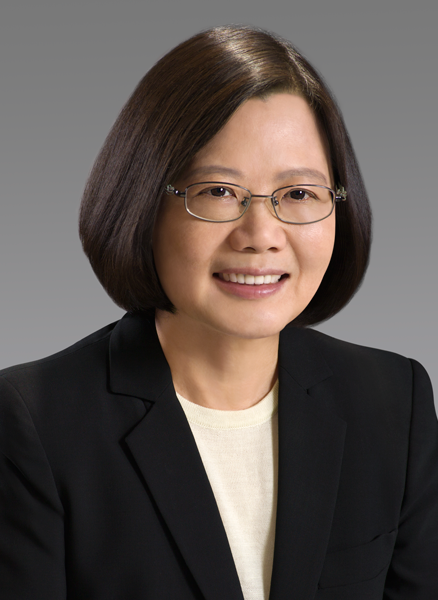

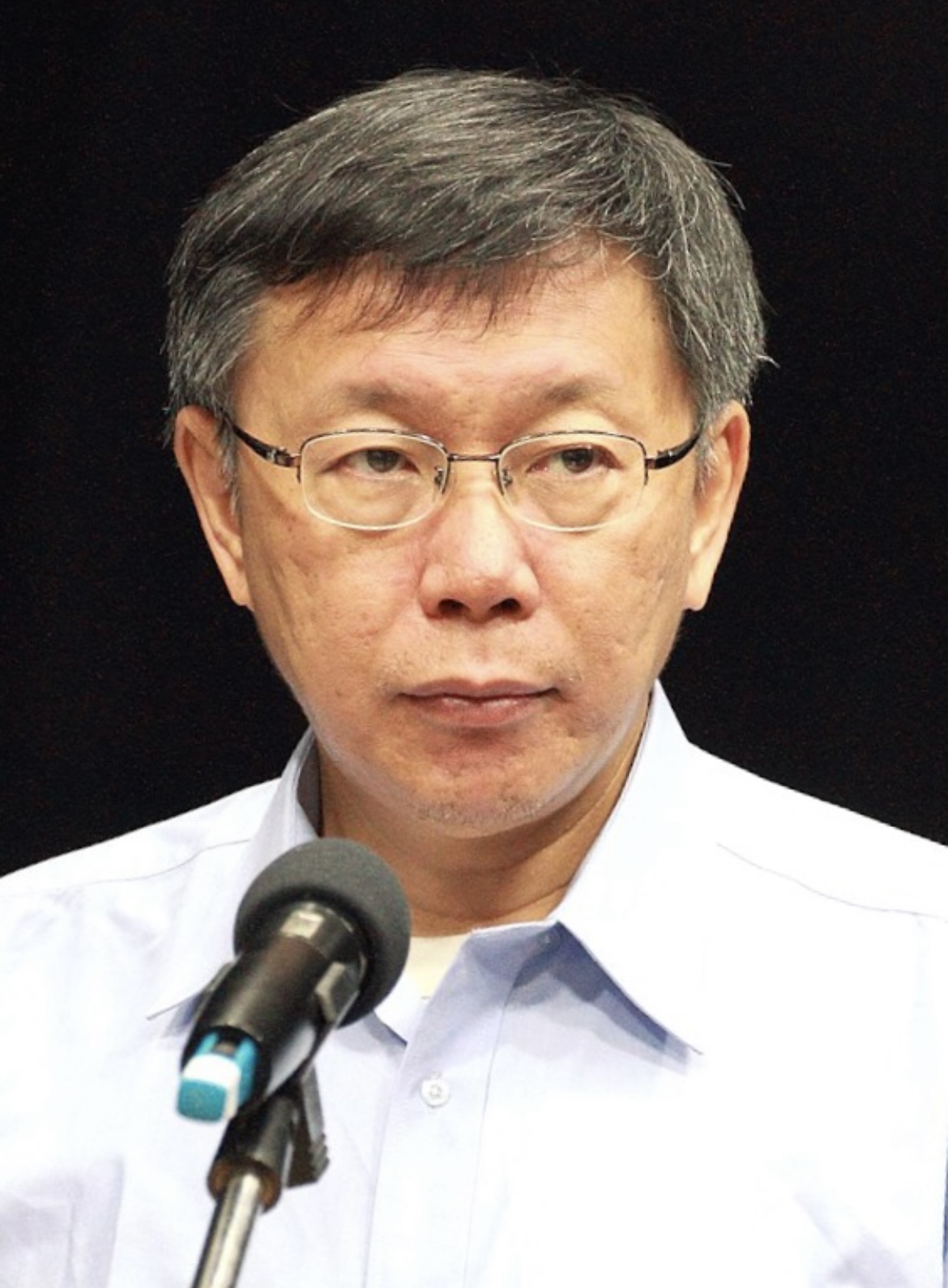
	First party	Second party	Third party
Leader	Eric Chu	Tsai Ing-wen	Ko Wen-je
Party	KMT	DPP	TPP
Leader since	5 October 2021	20 May 2020	6 August 2019
Last election	15 seats	6 seats	New party
Seats before	14 (Note: Han Kuo-yu was recalled in 2020.)	6 (Note: Chen Chi-mai won the by-election after Han Kuo-yu's recall. Lin Chih-chien resigned on 8 July 2022.)	1 (Note: Ko Wen-je won the 2018 Taipei mayoral race as an independent and later created the TPP in 2019.)
Seats won	14	5	2 (Note: Kinmen County Magistrate Chen Fu-hai secretly joined Taiwan People's Party before the election and was elected without party membership)
Seat change	▼1	▼1	▲2
Popular vote	5,761,851 (Note: Magisterial and mayoral elections only)	4,776,258	534,848
Percentage	50.14%	41.57%	4.65%
Swing	▲1.35 pp	▲2.41 pp	▲4.65 pp
Councillors	367	277	14
Councillors change	▼27	▲39	▲14
- KMT hold DPP hold TPP hold IND hold KMT gain DPP gain TPP gain IND gain

Local elections were held in Taiwan on 26 November and 18 December 2022 to elect county magistrates (city mayors), county (city) councilors, township mayors, township councilors and chiefs of village (borough) in 6 municipalities and 16 counties (cities). Elected officials would serve a four-year term. The election was held alongside the 2022 Taiwanese constitutional referendum.

The election resulted in a big loss for the ruling Democratic Progressive Party as all the mayoral and magisterial political candidates in the north were defeated. Tsai Ing-wen, the incumbent President of the Republic of China, resigned as party head after the poll, triggering a by-election for the position.

== Background ==
The Democratic Progressive Party announced in November 2021 that, prior to the 2022 elections, the party's chairperson would select candidates for mayoral posts in the special municipalities. Candidates would then be subject to approval by the party's central executive committee. Localities in which DPP-affiliated incumbents were ineligible for a third consecutive term will hold party primaries. To contest local offices held by Kuomintang members, the Democratic Progressive Party planned to host internal discussions to propose candidates and permit the party leader to nominate interested candidates for central executive committee approval.

It was reported in September 2020 that the Kuomintang would rely on opinion polls and satisfaction surveys to nominate candidates prior to the 2022 elections. Though the party had supported a successful recall of Legislative Yuan member Chen Po-wei of the Taiwan Statebuilding Party, the KMT lost the subsequent by-election to replace him, and was unsuccessful in another recall targeting independent legislator Freddy Lim. In addition to these electoral losses, proposals backed by the Kuomintang during the 2021 Taiwanese referendum also failed.

The New Power Party began naming candidates for local office in January 2022. In June, for the first time in party history, NPP-backed candidates for mayoral and magisterial posts were selected.

On 14 January 2022, the Central Election Commission announced that local elections would be held on 26 November 2022. After the death of candidate Huang Shao-tsung on 2 November 2022, the Chiayi mayoral election was rescheduled for 18 December 2022. Over 17,000 polling stations were open, from 08:00 to 16:00 on 26 November 2022, and more than 11,000 offices were contested in the election.

In the run-up to the elections, Taiwanese law enforcement carried out raids under the Anti-Infiltration Act on individuals suspected of buying votes on behalf of China.

== Results ==
The KMT won fourteen mayoral or magisterial seats, and the DPP won five seats. Taiwan People's Party (TPP) gained their mayoral seat in Hsinchu City and Kinmen County after chairman Ko Wen-je ineligible for re-election in Taipei. The election result, although broadly in line with expectations, was still a major defeat for DPP which was the worst electoral performance in the party's history. Taiwanese President Tsai Ing-wen, whose strategy to frame local elections as showing defiance to China failed, subsequently resigned as party chairwoman.

=== Vote summary ===
Vote summary of election at municipality and county level (Note: Vote/seat changes are compared with last local election)
Party	Magistrates, mayors					Councillors				
Party	Popular votes		±pp	Seats	+/-	Popular votes		±pp	Seats	+/-
Kuomintang	5,761,851	50.14%	▲1.35	14	Steady	4,306,343	37.75%	▼2.64	367	▼27
Democratic Progressive Party	4,776,258	41.57%	▲2.41	5	▼1	3,796,575	33.28%	▲2.23	277	▲39
Taiwan People's Party	534,848	4.65%	New	2	New	456,627	4.00%	New	14	New
Non-Partisan Solidarity Union	–	–	–	–	–	108,924	0.95%		7	▲2
New Power Party	70,503	0.61%		0	Steady	177,666	1.56%		6	▼10
Taiwan Solidarity Union	–	–	–	–	–	38,193	0.33%		3	▼2
Taiwan Statebuilding Party	–	–	–	–	–	124,070	1.09%		2	▲2
People First Party	–	–	–	–	–	11,875	0.10%		2	▼6
New Party	–	–	–	–	–	34,422	0.30%		1	▼1
Social Democratic Party	–	–	–	–	–	28,417	0.25%		1	Steady
Green Party	–	–	–	–	–	13,901	0.12%		1	▼2
Labor Party	–	–	–	–	–	7,308	0.06%		1	▼1
Zheng Shen Ming Party	–	–	–	–	–	3,691	0.03%	New	1	New
Taiwan Obasang Political Equality Party	–	–	–	–	–	40,704	0.36%	New	0	New
Taiwan Animal Protection Party	2,367	0.02%	N/A	0	N/A	4,480	0.04%	N/A	0	N/A
Taiwan Renewal Party	1,851	0.02%	New	0	New	2,845	0.02%	New	0	New
The Left Party	–	–	–	–	–	1,498	0.01%		0	Steady
Chinese Unification Promotion Party	–	–	–	–	–	1,160	0.01%		0	Steady
Tien-yi Party	919	0.01%	New	0	New	–	–	–	–	–
Golden Power Party	–	–	–	–	–	816	0.01%		0	
Jun People Party (台灣君民黨)	–	–	–	–	–	563	0.00%		0	
Happy People Party (台灣新住民黨)	–	–	–	–	–	529	0.00%	New	0	New
Republican Party (共和黨)	316	0.00%	N/A	0	N/A	67	0.00%	N/A	0	N/A
Sovereign State for Formosa & Pescadores Party	256	0.00%	New	0	New	–	–	–	–	–
Taiwan Motive Force Party (前進黨)	–	–	–	–	–	265	0.00%	New	0	New
中國和平統一黨	–	–	–	–	–	182	0.00%	N/A	0	N/A
Dragon Party (龍黨)	174	0.00%	N/A	0	N/A	–	–	–	–	–
Taiwan People's Communist Party	–	–	–	–	–	165	0.00%		0	Steady
National Socialist Chinese Labour Party (中國國家社會主義勞工黨)	–	–	–	–	–	99	0.00%		0	Steady
Independent	707,021	6.15%		1		2,246,798	19.69%		227	▼7
Total	11,490,975	100.00%		22	Steady	11,408,183	100.00%		910	▼2

Vote summary of election in townships, cities, indigenous districts, and villages
Party	Mayors, chief administrators					Council representatives					Village chiefs				
Party	Popular votes		+/-	Seats	+/-	Popular votes		+/-	Seats	+/-	Popular votes		+/-	Seats	+/-
Kuomintang	990,848	31.64%		76		472,741	15.10%		294		1,545,742	14.25%		953	
Democratic Progressive Party	897,075	28.64%		35		281,153	8.98%		123		409,771	3.78%		226	
Taiwan People's Party	11,569	0.37%		0		25,686	0.82%		9		17,276	0.16%		3	
Labor Party	6,625	0.21%		0		3,755	0.12%		1		–	–	–	–	–
New Power Party	–	–	–	–	–	5,922	0.19%		1		1,768	0.02%		1	
Chinese Unification Promotion Party	–	–	–	–	–	–	–	–	–	–	2,291	0.02%		2	
People's Democratic Party	–	–	–	–	–	–	–	–	–	–	3,936	0.04%		2	
Reunification Alliance Party	–	–	–	–	–	–	–	–	–	–	2,180	0.02%		1	
台灣澎友黨	–	–	–	–	–	250	0.01%		1		329	0.00%		0	
全國人民黨	–	–	–	–	–	–	–	–	–	–	198	0.00%		1	
Green Party	–	–	–	–	–	2,120	0.07%		0		–	–	–	–	–
People Union Party	–	–	–	–	–	–	–	–	–	–	1,263	0.01%		0	
中華文化復興在理黨	–	–	–	–	–	–	–	–	–	–	947	0.01%		0	
Tianzhou Peaceful Unity Family Party	–	–	–	–	–	–	–	–	–	–	845	0.01%		0	
新華勞動黨	–	–	–	–	–	–	–	–	–	–	685	0.01%		0	
Taiwan Labor Party	502	0.02%		0		48	0.00%		0		–	–	–	–	–
Youth Sunshine Party	–	–	–	–	–	–	–	–	–	–	467	0.00%		0	
Tian Yi Dang	–	–	–	–	–	–	–	–	–	–	397	0.00%		0	
經濟黨	–	–	–	–	–	–	–	–	–	–	360	0.00%		0	
前進黨	–	–	–	–	–	–	–	–	–	–	350	0.00%		0	
台灣進步黨	–	–	–	–	–	–	–	–	–	–	256	0.00%		0	
正黨	–	–	–	–	–	–	–	–	–	–	199	0.00%		0	
台灣學習黨	–	–	–	–	–	–	–	–	–	–	181	0.00%		0	
China Tide Association	–	–	–	–	–	–	–	–	–	–	132	0.00%		0	
Chinese People's Party	–	–	–	–	–	–	–	–	–	–	125	0.00%		0	
Civil Party	–	–	–	–	–	137	0.00%		0		31	0.00%		0	
共和黨	–	–	–	–	–	114	0.00%		0		–	–	–	–	–
台灣經濟發展黨	–	–	–	–	–	–	–	–	–	–	86	0.00%		0	
People First Party	–	–	–	–	–	–	–	–	–	–	71	0.00%		0	
For Public Good Party	–	–	–	–	–	–	–	–	–	–	51	0.00%		0	
新生黨	–	–	–	–	–	–	–	–	–	–	14	0.00%		0	
Independent	1,225,291	39.12%		93		2,339,118	74.71%		1,709		8,856,767	81.65%		6,551	
Total	3,131,910	100.00%		204	Steady	3,131,244	100.00%		2,139	▼10	10,846,732	100.00%		7,748	▼12

=== Elected officials and councils ===
Elected magistrates/mayors and council composition in the 2022 Taiwanese local election
Subdivision	Magistrate/mayor		Council				
Subdivision	Party result	Elect (Note: Bold names indicate newly-elected leaders)	First party	Seats (Note: Bold figures indicate majority)	Second party	Seats	Total seats
Taipei City	KMT gain from TPP	Chiang Wan-an	KMT	30 ▲1	DPP	21 ▲2	61
New Taipei City	KMT hold	Hou You-yi	KMT	32 ▼1	DPP	28 ▲3	66
Taoyuan City	KMT gain from DPP	Chang San-cheng	KMT	29 ▼3	DPP	24 ▲6	63
Taichung City	KMT hold	Lu Shiow-yen	KMT	32	DPP	24 ▼1	65
Tainan City	DPP hold	Huang Wei-cher	DPP	28 ▲3	KMT	15 ▼1	57
Kaohsiung City	DPP hold	Chen Chi-mai	KMT	29 ▼4	DPP	27 ▲2	65
Yilan County	KMT hold	Lin Zi-miao	KMT	13	DPP	11 ▲3	34
Hsinchu County	KMT hold	Yang Wen-ke	KMT	19	DPP	6 ▲4	37
Miaoli County	Independent gain from KMT	Chung Tung-chin	KMT	7 ▼7	DPP	7 ▲3	38
Changhua County	KMT hold	Wang Huei-mei	KMT	27 ▼1	DPP	16 ▲4	54
Nantou County	KMT hold	Hsu Shu-hua	KMT	13 ▼4	DPP	8	37
Yunlin County	KMT hold	Chang Li-shan	DPP	11 ▼1	KMT	9 ▲2	43
Chiayi County	DPP hold	Weng Chang-liang	DPP	18 ▲1	KMT	8 ▼1	37
Pingtung County	DPP hold	Chou Chun-mi	KMT	19 ▲2	DPP	13 ▼2	55
Taitung County	KMT hold	Rao Ching-ling	KMT	18 ▼3	DPP	2 ▲1	30
Hualien County	KMT hold	Hsu Chen-wei	KMT	18	DPP	3	33
Penghu County	DPP gain from KMT	Chen Kuang-fu	KMT	4	DPP	3	19
Keelung City	KMT gain from DPP	George Hsieh	KMT	13 ▼3	DPP	12 ▲6	31
Hsinchu City	TPP gain from DPP	Ann Kao	KMT	12 ▼3	DPP	8 ▲2	34
Chiayi City	KMT hold	Huang Min-hui	KMT	6 ▲1	DPP	6 ▲2	23
Kinmen County	TPP gain from KMT	Chen Fu-hai	KMT	7 ▼2	DPP	1 ▲1	19
Lienchiang County	KMT hold	Wang Chung-ming	KMT	7	Independent	—N/a	9

== Magistrate and mayor elections ==
=== Results ===
2022 Taiwan Magistrate/Mayor Election Results
Subdivision	Electorate	Turnout (%)	Winner			Runner-up			Map
Subdivision	Electorate	Turnout (%)	Name	Votes	%	Name	Votes	%	Map
New Taipei City	3,316,517	56.60%	Hou You-yi	1,152,555	62.42%	Lin Chia-lung	693,976	37.58%	
Taipei City	2,026,769	67.70%	Chiang Wan-an	575,590	42.29%	Chen Shih-chung	434,558	31.93%	
Taoyuan City	1,825,127	59.46%	Chang San-cheng	557,572	52.02%	Cheng Yun-peng	428,983	40.03%	
Taichung City	2,274,107	60.01%	Lu Shiow-yen	799,107	59.35%	Tsai Chi-chang	524,224	38.93%	
Tainan City	1,548,203	58.68%	Huang Wei-cher	433,684	48.80%	Hsieh Lung-chieh	387,731	43.63%	
Kaohsiung City	2,282,623	58.61%	Chen Chi-mai	766,147	58.10%	Ko Chih-en	529,607	40.16%	
Yilan County	374,779	64.28%	Lin Zi-miao	119,421	50.76%	Chiang Tsung-yuan	96,779	41.13%	
Hsinchu County	452,720	58.98%	Yang Wen-ke	163,662	63.36%	Chou Chiang-chieh	83,683	32.40%	
Miaoli County	443,908	67.20%	Chung Tung-chin	124,603	42.66%	Hsu Ting-chen	91,260	31.24%	
Changhua County	1,028,606	64.90%	Wang Huei-mei	369,133	56.75%	Huang Hsiu-fang	272,817	41.94%	
Nantou County	406,195	69.08%	Hsu Shu-hua	154,256	55.99%	Frida Tsai	117,993	42.83%	
Yunlin County	559,273	67.35%	Chang Li-shan	207,519	56.57%	Liu Chien-kuo	152,620	41.60%	
Chiayi County	422,568	67.32%	Weng Chang-liang	171,777	62.85%	Wang Yu-min	101,517	37.15%	
Pingtung County	679,330	67.18%	Chou Chun-mi	217,537	49.09%	Su Ching-chuan	206,460	46.59%	
Taitung County	177,853	64.79%	Rao Ching-ling	68,661	61.22%	Liu Chao-hao	41,104	36.65%	
Hualien County	266,058	57.56%	Hsu Chen-wei	96,645	64.73%	Kolas Yotaka	47,845	32.04%	
Penghu County	90,360	58.51%	Chen Kuang-fu	18,777	36.64%	Lai Feng-wei	17,081	33.33%	
Keelung City	307,913	60.16%	George Hsieh	96,784	52.92%	Tsai Shih-ying	71,354	39.01%	
Hsinchu City	350,758	62.94%	Ann Kao	98,121	45.02%	Shen Hui-hung	77,764	35.68%	
Chiayi City	93,813	43.99%	Huang Min-hui	59,874	63.82%	Lee Chun-yi	32,790	34.95%	
Kinmen County	122,294	39.32%	Chen Fu-hai	23,248	49.34%	Yang Cheng-wu	19,340	41.05%	
Lienchiang County	11,810	72.99%	Wang Chung-ming	4,337	50.99%	Tsao Erh-yuan	3,582	42.12%	

== Councillor elections ==
=== Nominations ===
Province	County	Members	KMT	DPP	TPP	NPP	TSP	GPT	NP	PFP	NPSU	Other	IND
Special municipality		Members	KMT	DPP	TPP	NPP	TSP	GPT	NP	PFP	NPSU	Other	IND
New Taipei		66	38	36	11	3	1		3		4	6	26
Taipei		61	32	28	8	5	1	1	6			8	28
Taoyuan		63	36	32	7	6	1	1	1	1		3	43
Taichung		65	34	34	11	5	4					5	39
Tainan		57	19	34	6	3	5				3	4	32
Kaohsiung		65	35	36	5	6	7				2	3	34
Taiwan Province
Taiwan Province	Yilan County	34	15	16	2	2	2			1		1	20
Taiwan Province	Hsinchu County	37	27	9	4	2		2				2	27
Taiwan Province	Miaoli County	38	10	10	4	3						1	45
Taiwan Province	Changhua County	54	28	23	4	2						2	26
Taiwan Province	Nantou County	37	20	14	2							2	31
Taiwan Province	Yunlin County	43	9	16	3							2	39
Taiwan Province	Chiayi County	37	10	23									24
Taiwan Province	Pingtung County	55	24	22	1	1	1					1	51
Taiwan Province	Taitung County	30	23	6	1							1	30
Taiwan Province	Hualien County	33	28	7	2	1							20
Taiwan Province	Penghu County	19	6	4	1								17
Taiwan Province	Keelung	31	19	13	5	2				3			14
Taiwan Province	Hsinchu	34	15	8	7	4		1				1	26
Taiwan Province	Chiayi	23	10	9	1	1	2					1	16
Fujian Province	Kinmen County	19	9	1	1								21
Fujian Province	Lienchiang County	9	9	1									5
Total		910	457	382	86	46	24	5	10	5	10	43	618

==== Results ====
Province	County	Members	KMT	DPP	TPP	NPP	TSP	GPT	NP	PFP	NPSU	Other	IND
Special municipality		Members	KMT	DPP	TPP	NPP	TSP	GPT	NP	PFP	NPSU	Other	IND
New Taipei		66	32	28	1						2		3
Taipei		61	30	21	4				1			1	4
Taoyuan		63	29	24									10
Taichung		65	32	24	1	1							7
Tainan		57	15	28			1				2	1	10
Kaohsiung		65	29	27			1				2	1	5
Taiwan Province
Taiwan Province	Yilan County	34	13	11								1	9
Taiwan Province	Hsinchu County	37	19	6	1							1	10
Taiwan Province	Miaoli County	38	7	7		1							23
Taiwan Province	Changhua County	54	27	16	2								9
Taiwan Province	Nantou County	37	13	8	1								15
Taiwan Province	Yunlin County	43	9	11	1							1	21
Taiwan Province	Chiayi County	37	8	18									11
Taiwan Province	Pingtung County	55	13	19									23
Taiwan Province	Taitung County	30	18	2									10
Taiwan Province	Hualien County	33	18	3	1								11
Taiwan Province	Penghu County	19	4	3							1		11
Taiwan Province	Keelung	31	13	12						2			4
Taiwan Province	Hsinchu	34	12	8	2	3		1					8
Taiwan Province	Chiayi	23	6	6		1							10
Fujian Province	Kinmen County	19	7	1									11
Fujian Province	Lienchiang County	9	7										2
Total		910	367	277	14	6	2	1	1	2	7	6	227

Speaker/Deputy Speaker election
Special municipality		Speaker (Party)	Deputy Speaker (Party)
Province	County	Speaker (Party)	Deputy Speaker (Party)
New Taipei		Chiang Ken-huang (Kuomintang)	Chen Hung-yuan (Kuomintang)
Taipei		Tai Hsi-Chin (Kuomintang)	Yeh Lin-chuan (Kuomintang)
Taoyuan		Chiu Yi-sheng (Kuomintang)	Li Hsiao-chung (Kuomintang)
Taichung		Chang Ching-chao (Kuomintang)	Yen Li-min (Kuomintang)
Tainan		Chiu Li-li (Democratic Progressive Party)	Lin Chih-chan (Democratic Progressive Party)
Kaohsiung		Kang Yu-cheng ( Democratic Progressive Party)	Tseng Chun-chieh (Independent)
Taiwan Province	Yilan County	Chang Sheng-te (Kuomintang)	Chen Han-chung (Independent)
Taiwan Province	Hsinchu County	Chang Chen-jung (Kuomintang)	Wang Ping-han (Kuomintang)
Taiwan Province	Miaoli County	Li Wen-pin (Kuomintang)	Chang Shu-fen (Kuomintang)
Taiwan Province	Changhua County	Hsieh Tien-lin (Kuomintang)	Hsu Yuan-lung (Kuomintang)
Taiwan Province	Nantou County	Ho Sheng-feng (Kuomintang)	Pan Yi-chuan (Kuomintang)
Taiwan Province	Yunlin County	Shen Tsung-lung (Kuomintang)	Tsai Yung-te (Independent)
Taiwan Province	Chiayi County	Chang Ming-ta (Democratic Progressive Party)	Chen Yi-yueh (Democratic Progressive Party)
Taiwan Province	Pingtung County	Chou Tien-lun (Kuomintang)	Lu Wen-jui (Independent)
Taiwan Province	Taitung County	Wu Hsiu-hua (Kuomintang)	Lin Tsung-han (Kuomintang)
Taiwan Province	Hualien County	Chang Chun (Independent)	Hsu Hsueh-yu (Kuomintang)
Taiwan Province	Penghu County	Liu Chen Chao-ling (Kuomintang)	Lan Kai-yuan (Independent)
Taiwan Province	Keelung	Tung Tzu-wei (Democratic Progressive Party)	Yang Hsiu-yu (People First Party)
Taiwan Province	Hsinchu	Hsu Hsiu-jui (Kuomintang)	Yu Pang-yen (Kuomintang)
Taiwan Province	Chiayi	Chen Tzu-wen (Independent)	Chang Jung-tsang (Independent)
Fujian Province	Kinmen County	Hung Yun-tien (Kuomintang)	Ouyang Yi-hsiung (Kuomintang)
Fujian Province	Lienchiang County	Chang Yung-chiang (Kuomintang)	Lin Ming-yang (Kuomintang)
