= 2023 Democratic Progressive Party chairmanship by-election =

Party leadership election in Taiwan

2023 Democratic Progressive Party chairmanship election
- 15 January 2023
- Turnout: 17.59%
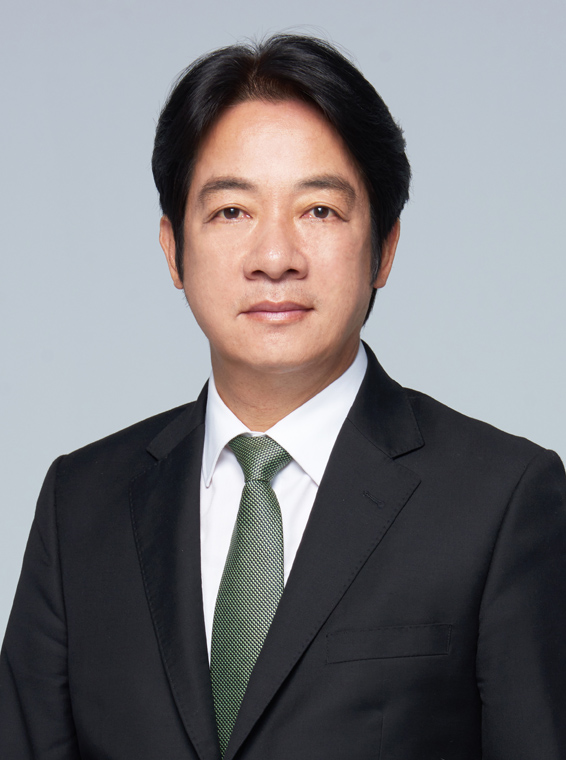
Candidate	Lai Ching-te
Popular vote	41,840
Percentage	100%
Chairperson before election
Chen Chi-mai (acting)
Elected Chairperson
Lai Ching-te

The 2023 Democratic Progressive Party chairmanship election was held on 15 January 2023 to elect the new chairperson of the party. Vice President Lai Ching-te was unopposed and elected to succeed President Tsai Ing-wen, who resigned after the party's poor showing in the 2022 local elections.

== Background ==
After the 2022 local elections which saw the worst performance of the Democratic Progressive Party, Tsai Ing-wen, President of Taiwan, resigned as the chairlady of the Party, therefore triggering a by-election to find a new leader.

Vice President Lai Ching-te, seen as a potential candidate for the 2024 presidential election which Tsai is ineligible for re-election, was the only candidate in the by-election. Lai announced his candidacy on 8 December 2022, with the whole party reportedly united in support.

Lai promised to stabilise the party after the unprecedented defeat and to win back public trust. He also stressed the importance of cultivating talents and defending democracy on the island.

== Result ==
With an increased turnout of 17.59%, Lai won the unconstested election by capturing 99.65% of all votes cast. He formally assumed the office on 18 January 2023.

Lai has not directly said whether he intends to run in the presidential vote, but is widely expected to do so now after taking over the leadership of the party. In a statement, he pledged to win back public trust for the party and to "firmly protect Taiwan and promote Taiwan's democracy, peace and prosperity in a complex and changeable international situation".

Candidate	Party	Votes	%
Lai Ching-te	Democratic Progressive Party	41,840	100.00
Total		41,840	100.00
Valid votes		41,840	99.65
Invalid/blank votes		149	0.35
Total votes		41,989	100.00
Registered voters/turnout		238,664	17.59
