= Zheng Shen Min Party =

Taiwanese political party

Zheng Shen Min Party 正神名黨
- Chairperson: Hsu Jung-te
- Vice chairpersons: Yen Tung-ching; Chen Chun-hsien
- Founded: May 9, 2021
- Headquarters: 175 Chongshen Street, Yilan City, Yilan, Taiwan
- Political position: Centre
- Local councillors: 1 / 910

The Zheng Shen Min Party (Chinese: 正神名黨; pinyin: Zhèng shén míng dǎng; lit. 'Righteous God Party') is a political party in Taiwan. The party was established in 2021 with approval from the Ministry of the Interior and is headquartered in Yilan City, Yilan.

== History ==
The Zheng Shen Min Party was founded on May 9, 2021, and was approved later that year on June 8. On November 25 of the same year, the party was registered by the Yilan District Court.

Yang Hsun-mu did not receive a nomination from the Democratic Progressive Party in the 2022 local elections, choose to run as a Zheng Shen Min Party candidate instead, and was elected to the Yilan County Council later that year.
