= Chung Tung-chin =

Taiwanese politician

- 鍾東錦
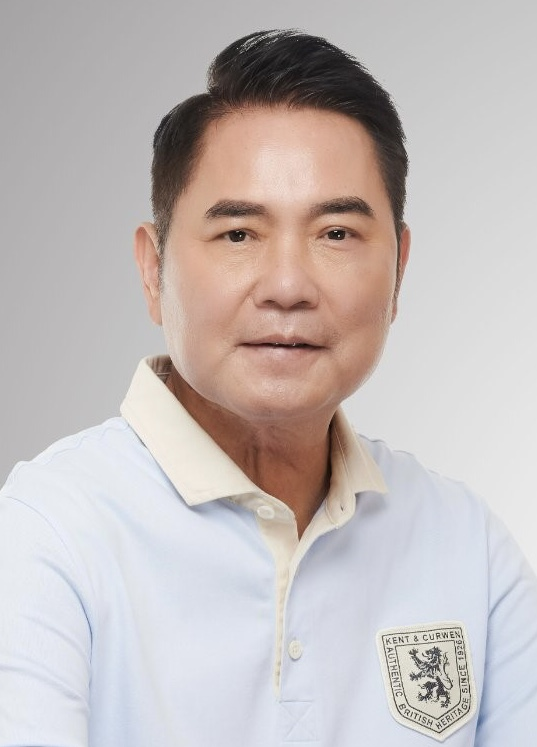
- Official portrait, 2022

12th Magistrate of Miaoli
- Incumbent
- Assumed office 25 December 2022
- Deputy: Deng Kui-chu; Chiu Li-li
- Preceded by: Hsu Yao-chang

19th Speaker of Miaoli County Council
- In office 25 December 2018 – 25 December 2022
- Vice Speaker: Lee Wen-ping
- Preceded by: Chen Chao-ming
- Succeeded by: Lee Wen-ping

18th Vice Speaker of Miaoli County Council
- In office 25 December 2014 – 25 December 2018
- Speaker: Chen Chao-ming
- Preceded by: Chen Chao-ming
- Succeeded by: Lee Wen-ping

Miaoli County Councillor
- In office 25 December 2014 – 25 December 2022
- Constituency: Miaoli V

Personal details
- Born: Chung Chao-ping; 2 January 1963 (age 63) Nanzhuang, Miaoli County, Taiwan
- Party: Independent; Kuomintang (until June 2022; membership removed)
- Education: Chung Hua University (BA)

Chung Tung-chin (Chinese: 鍾東錦; pinyin: Zhōng Dōngjǐn; born 2 January 1963) is a Taiwanese politician. He was elected to the Miaoli County Council in 2014 and became its speaker in 2018. He vacated his council seat and leadership in 2022 to take office as magistrate of Miaoli County.

== Political career ==
Chung was elected a Miaoli County Councilor in 2014 and became its speaker in 2018. During Chung's speakership, the Miaoli County Council in 2019 became the first county council in Taiwan to hold a full session in Hakka.

=== Miaoli County Magistrate ===
Chung ran as a Kuomintang (KMT) candidate for the 2022 Miaoli County magistrate election but did not receive the party's endorsement; the KMT nomination went to Hsieh Fu-hung (traditional Chinese: 謝福弘; simplified Chinese: 谢福弘) instead. Chung then registered as an independent candidate in June 2022 and was expelled from the KMT in September.

During the election campaign, Chung promised to continue the incumbent magistrate Hsu Yao-chang's policies. He also promised to carry out the social welfare programs of the Miaoli County Government, such as social housing, festival grants, free lunches for school students, etc. In October 2022, Legislative Yuan members affiliated with the Democratic Progressive Party petitioned the Control Yuan to investigate a statement of personal assets declared by Chung. That same month, Hsieh Fu-hung, the DPP, and the New Power Party presented evidence indicating that Chung had been convicted of murder in 1987, and urged him to withdraw his candidacy. In December 2022, the Miaoli District Prosecutors Office began investigating Chung's campaign regarding allegations of vote buying; in turn, Chung accused the authorities of political bias. The Miaoli District Court rejected the allegations in July 2023, determining that Chung's supporters and campaign staff had given money to other candidates for local political office.

2022 Miaoli County Magistrate Election Result
No.	Candidate	Party	Votes	Percentage
1	Chung Tung-chin	Independent	124,603	42.66%
2	Hsu Ting-chen (徐定禎)	DPP	91,260	31.24%
3	Sung Kuo-ting (宋國鼎)	NPP	39,347	13.47%
4	Hsieh Fu-hung (謝福弘)	KMT	32,026	10.96%
5	Wu Sheng-sheng (吳盛聖)	Independent	4,864	1.67%
