= Keelung City Council =

Council of Keelung City, Taiwan

Coordinates: 25°7′53.2″N 121°44′56.1″E

Keelung City Council 基隆市議會

Type
- Type: City Council

Leadership
- Speaker: Tong Zi-Wei since 2022
- Deputy Speaker: Yang Shou-Yu since 2022

Structure
- Seats: 31
- Political groups: DPP (12); KMT (11); NPSU (6); PFP (1)

Elections
- Voting system: Single non-transferable vote
- Last election: 2022

Meeting place
- Xinyi, Keelung City, Taiwan

Website
- Official website (in Chinese)

The Keelung City Council or Keelung Municipal Council (KMC; traditional Chinese: 基隆市議會; simplified Chinese: 基隆市议会; pinyin: Jīlóng Shì Yìhuì) is the elected city council of Keelung City, Republic of China. The council composes of 32 councilors lastly elected through the 2022 Republic of China local election on 26 November 2022.

== Organization ==
- Review Committees
  - Civil Administration
  - Finance
  - Construction
  - Education
- Procedure Committee
- Discipline Committee

== Transportation ==
The council is accessible within walking distance East of Keelung Station of Taiwan Railway.

== See also ==
- Keelung City Government
