= Taoyuan City Council =

Legislature of Taoyuan City, Taiwan

Coordinates: 24.9970°N 121.3218°E

Taoyuan City Council 桃園市議會

Type
- Type: Municipal council

Leadership
- Speaker: Chi Yi-sheng since 2010 (Taoyuan County Council)
- Deputy Speaker: Li Hsiao-chung since 2010 (Taoyuan County Council)

Structure
- Seats: 63
- Political groups: KMT (30); DPP (24); Independent (9)

Elections
- Voting system: Single non-transferable vote
- Last election: 2022

Meeting place
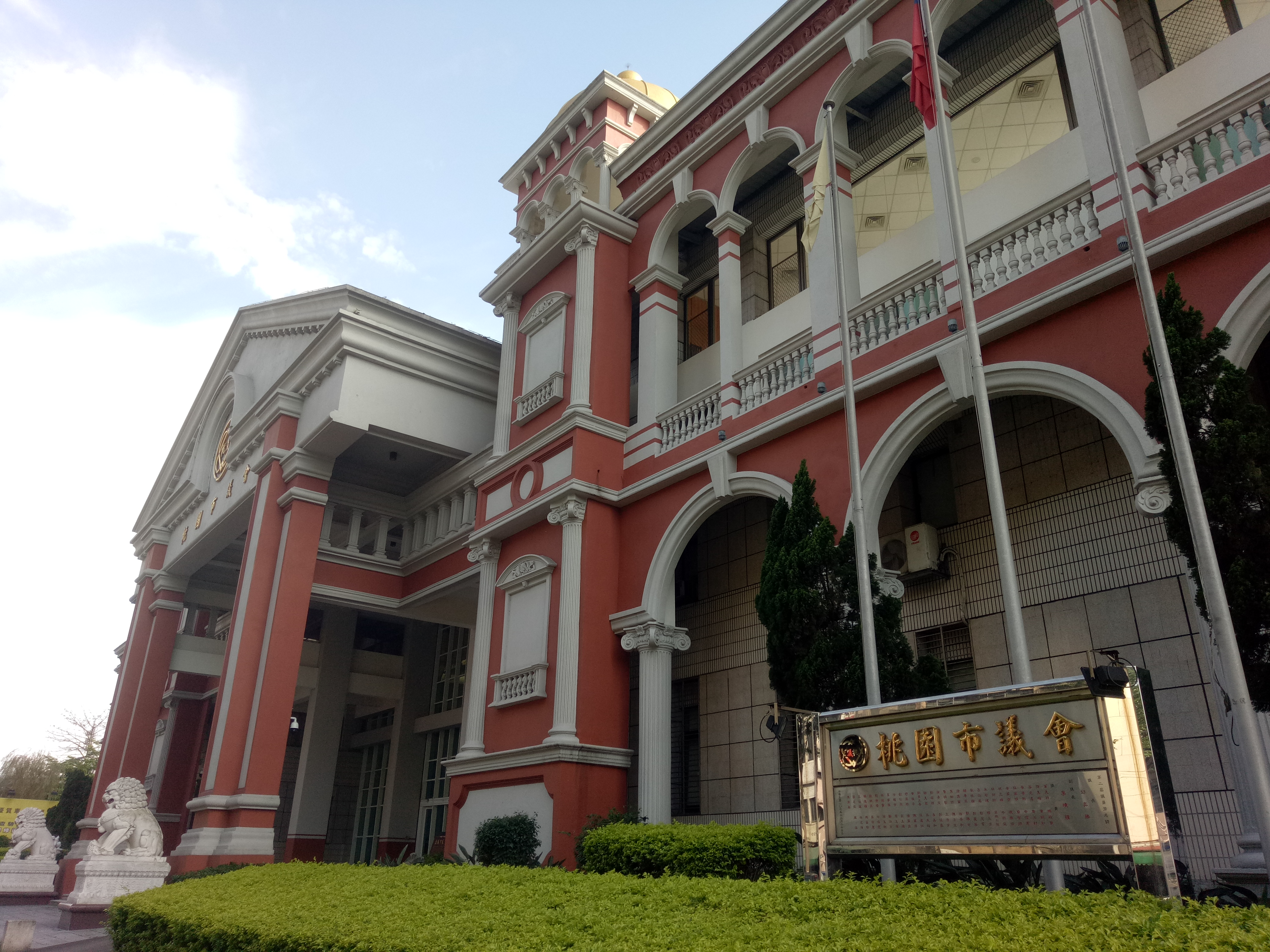
- The Building of Taoyuan City Council; Taoyuan District, Taoyuan City, Taiwan

Website
- Official website

The Taoyuan City Council (TYCC; traditional Chinese: 桃園市議會; simplified Chinese: 桃园市议会; pinyin: Táoyuán Shì Yìhuì) is the elected municipal council of Taoyuan City, Republic of China (Taiwan). The council composes of 60 councillors elected once every four years by single non-transferable vote, most recently in the 2022 Taiwanese local elections on 26 November 2022.

== History ==
The council was established on 21 January 1951 as Taoyuan County Council. On 25 December 2014, the council was promoted in status to Taoyuan City Council after Taoyuan County becomes a special municipality.

== Current composition ==
Since the local elections in 2022, the council was composed as follows:

Composition of Taoyuan City Council
Party Groups	Seats
Kuomintang ("Chinese Nationalist Party")	30
Democratic Progressive Party; Mínzhǔ Jìnbù Dǎng	24
Independent	9
Total	57

== Organization ==
=== Committees ===
- First Examination Team
- Second Examination Team
- Third Examination Team
- Fourth Examination Team
- Fifth Examination Team
- Sixth Examination Team
- Procedural Examination Team
- Discipline Committee

=== Departments ===
- Agenda Procedure Division
- General Affairs Division
- Legal Affairs Office
- Information and Library Office
- Public Relationship Office
- Accounting Office
- Personnel Office

== Speakers ==
=== Taoyuan County Council ===
- Tseng Chung-yi (2002-2010)
- Chi Yi-sheng (2010-2014)

=== Taoyuan City Council ===
- Chi Yi-sheng (2014-)

== See also ==
- Taoyuan City Government
