= Taichung City Council =

Legislature of Taichung City, Taiwan

Coordinates: 24°9′30.1″N 120°38′41.3″E

Taichung City Council 台中市議會

Type
- Type: Municipal council

Leadership
- Speaker: Chang Ching-Chao
- Deputy Speaker: Yan Li-Min

Structure
- Seats: 65
- Political groups: KMT (32); DPP (24); TPP (1); Independent (7)

Elections
- Voting system: Single non-transferable vote
- Last election: 2022

Meeting place
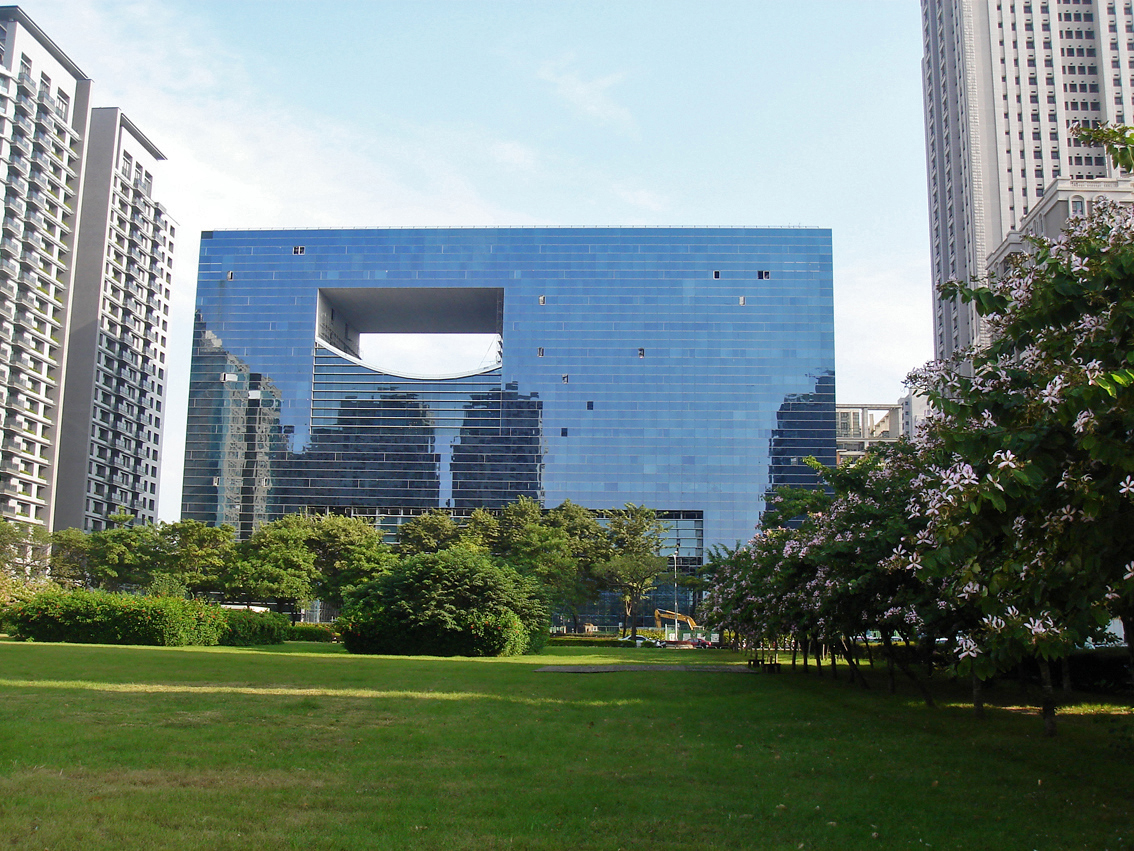
- The Building of Taichung City Council; Xitun District, Taichung City, Taiwan

Website
- Official website

The Taichung City Council (TCCC; traditional Chinese: 台中市議會; simplified Chinese: 台中市议会; pinyin: Táizhōng Shì Yìhuì) is the elected municipal council of Taichung City, Republic of China. The council is composed of 63 councilors elected in the Republic of China local elections on 24 November 2022.

== History ==
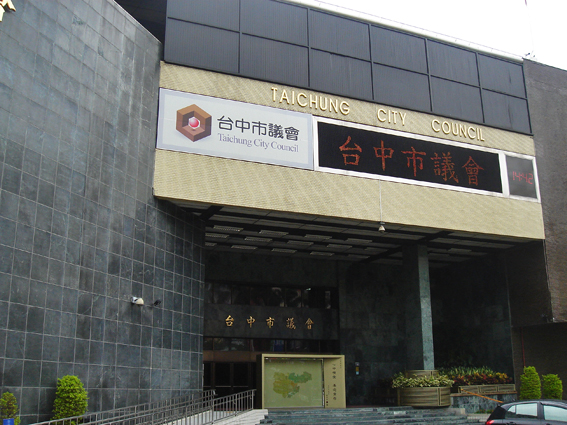
Former Taichung City Council building

Taichung City Council was officially formed on 25 December 2010 after the merging between Taichung City and Taichung County to form the Taichung municipality.

== Organization ==
- Speaker
- Deputy Speaker
- Secretary-General
- Deputy Secretary-General
- Secretary
  - Secretarial Office
  - Procedure Section
  - General Affairs Section
  - Public Relations Section
  - Administration Office
  - Legal Affairs Office
  - Document Archives and Information Management Office
  - Personnel Office
  - Accounting Office
  - Civil Affairs Committee
  - Finance and Economic Committee
  - Education and Culture Committee
  - Transportation and Land Administration Committee
  - Police, Fire and Environmental Sanitation Committee
  - Urban Development, Construction and Water Resources Committee
  - Legislation Committee

== See also ==
- Taichung City Government
