= Changhua County Council =

Legislature of Changhua County, Taiwan

Coordinates: 24°4′40.2″N 120°32′41.2″E

Changhua County Council 彰化縣議會
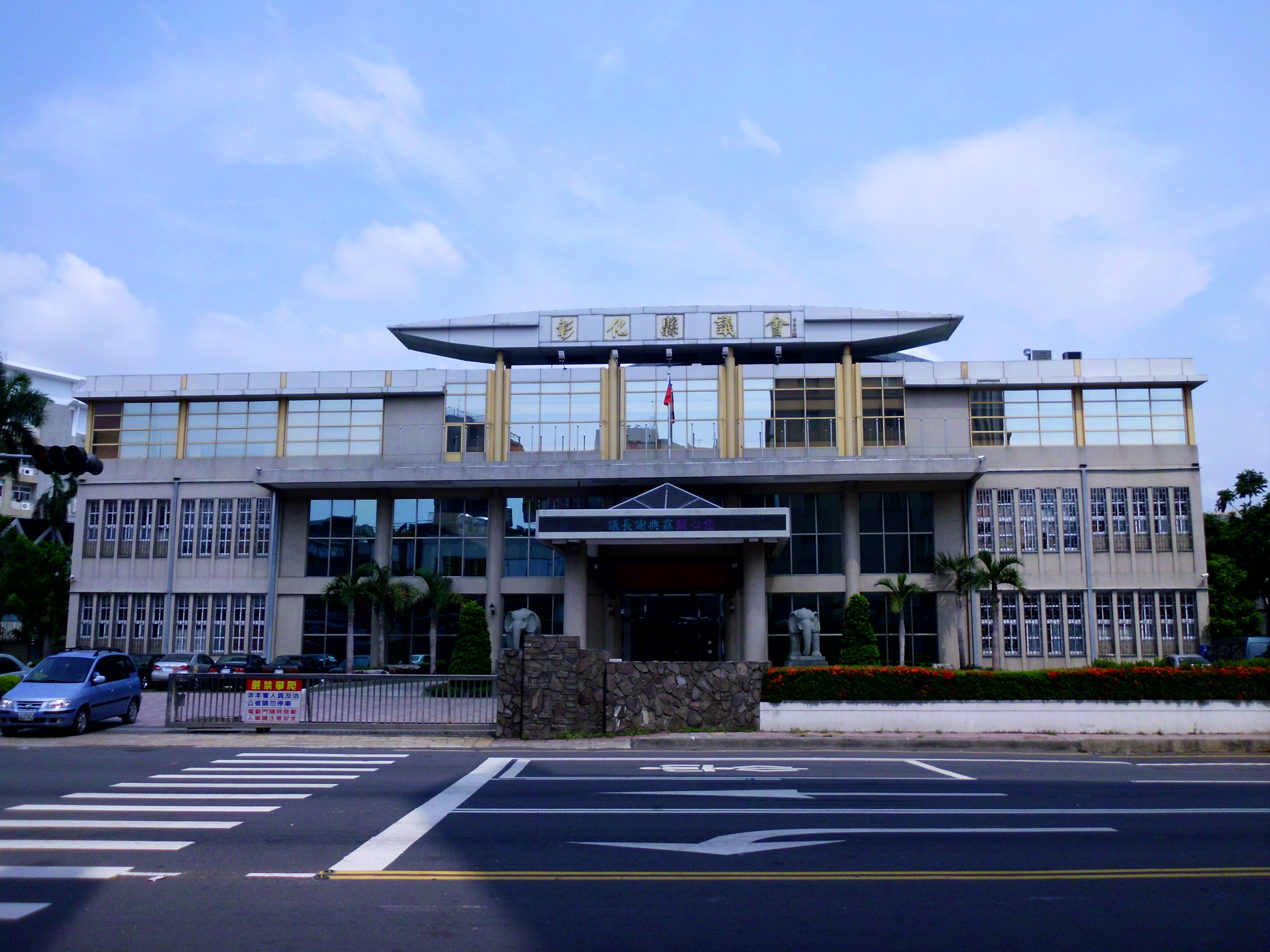

Type
- Type: County Council of Changhua County

History
- Founded: 4 February 1951

Leadership
- Speaker: Hsieh Tien-lun, Kuomintang
- Deputy Speaker: Hsu Yuan-lung, Kuomintang

Structure
- Seats: 54
- Political groups: KMT (24); DPP (17); Independent (10); TPP (2)

Elections
- Voting system: Single non-transferable vote
- Last election: 2022

Meeting place
- Changhua City, Changhua County, Taiwan Province, Republic of China

Website
- Official website

Constitution
- Chapter XI, Section 2, Article 124 of the Constitution of the Republic of China

The Changhua County Council (CHCC; traditional Chinese: 彰化縣議會; simplified Chinese: 彰化县议会; pinyin: Zhānghuà Xiàn Yìhuì) is the elected county council of Changhua County, Taiwan. The council composes of 54 councilors elected in local elections held every four years.

== History ==
The council was originally established and held its first meeting on 4 February 1951 with 10 constituencies. In 1953, the constituencies was reduced to 9.

== Organization ==
- Speaker
- Secretary-General
- Secretary
- Office Administration
- Office of Council Affairs
- Office of General Affairs
- Office of Accounting
- Office of Legal
- Office of Personnel

== Constituencies ==
- 1st constituency: Changhua City, Huatan Township, Fenyuan Township
- 2nd constituency: Fuxing Township, Lukang Township, Xiushui Township
- 3rd constituency: Hemei Township, Shengang Township, Xianxi Township
- 4th constituency: Yuanlin City, Dacun Township, Yongjing Township
- 5th constituency: Puxin Township, Puyan Township, Xihu Township
- 6th constituency: Ershui Township, Shetou Township, Tianzhong Township
- 7th constituency: Beidou Township, Pitou Township, Tianwei Township, Xizhou Township
- 8th constituency: Dacheng Township, Erlin Township, Fangyuan Township, Zhutang Township
- 9th constituency: First natives dwelling in various cities, towns and villages

== Access ==
The council building is accessible within walking distance East from Changhua Station of Taiwan Railway.

== See also ==
- Changhua County Government
