= Lienchiang County Council =

Legislature of Lienchiang County, Taiwan

Coordinates: 26.1634°N 119.9520°E

Lienchiang County Council 連江縣議會
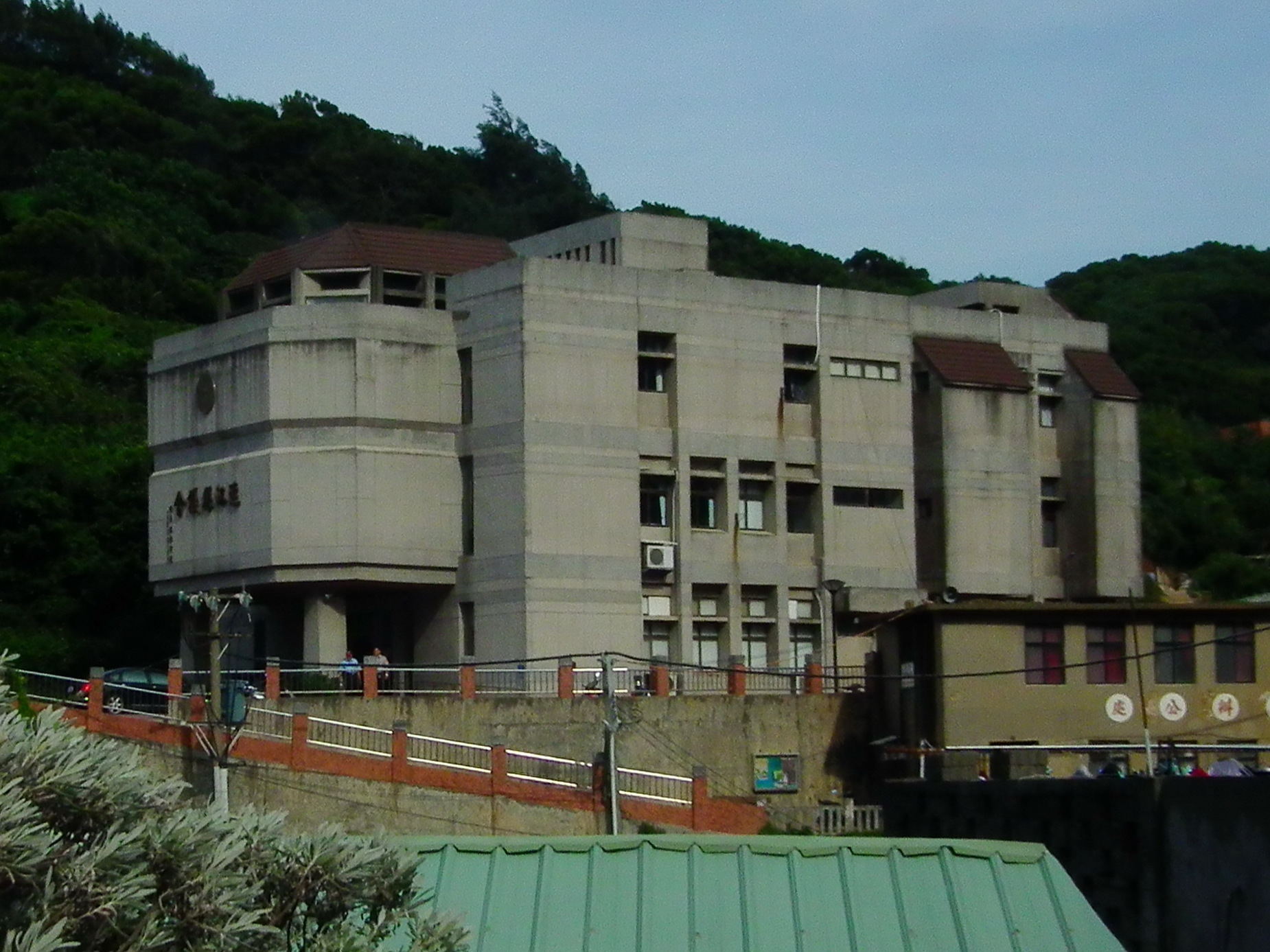

Type
- Type: County Council of Lienchiang County

Leadership
- Speaker: Chen Kuei-chung, Independent
- Deputy Speaker: Tsao Yi-piao, Independent

Structure
- Seats: 9
- Political groups: KMT (7); NPSU (2)

Elections
- Voting system: Single non-transferable vote
- Last election: 2022

Meeting place
- Fusing, Nangan, Lienchiang, Fujian, Republic of China

Website
- Official website (in Chinese)

The Lienchiang County Council (MTCC; Chinese: 連江縣議會; pinyin: Liánjiāng Xiàn Yìhuì) is the elected county council of Lienchiang County, Republic of China. The council composes of nine councilors lastly elected through the 2022 Republic of China local election on 26 November 2022. It has the fewest seats among all councils in Taiwan.

== History ==
MTCC was originally established as Lienchiang County Affairs Counseling Committee in 1957 by the Executive Yuan. On 7 November 1992, the martial law was lifted from Matsu and the committee was reformed into Lienchiang Temporary County Council and its councilor members were appointed by Fujian Provincial Government. The first election for the councilor members were done in January 1994, and in March 1994 it was finally changed and inaugurated to Lienchiang County Council. On 7 November 1996, the current council building in Fuxing Village of Nangan Township was completed.

== Organization ==
- Speaker
- Deputy Speaker

=== Administrative departments ===
- Personnel Administrator
- Accountant
- Regulation
- Office of General Affairs
- Session Procedures
- Secretary

=== Sessions ===
- Examining Committee A
- Examining Committee B
- Discipline Committee
- Procedure Committee

== Transportation ==
The council is accessible within walking distance from Matsu Nangan Airport.

== See also ==
- Lienchiang County Government
