= Penghu County Council =

Legislature of Penghu County, Taiwan

Coordinates: 23.5692°N 119.5666°E

Penghu County Council 澎湖縣議會

Type
- Type: county council

Leadership
- Speaker: Liu Chen Zhao-ling
- Deputy Speaker: Lan Kai-yuan

Structure
- Seats: 19
- Political groups: KMT (4); NPSU (1); DPP (3); Independent (11)

Elections
- Voting system: single non-transferable vote
- Last election: 2022

Meeting place
- Magong, Penghu, Taiwan

The Penghu County Council (traditional Chinese: 澎湖縣議會; simplified Chinese: 澎湖县议会; pinyin: Pēnghú Xiàn Yìhuì) is the elected county council of Penghu County, Republic of China. It is composed of 19 councilors who were last elected in the 2022 Republic of China local election on 26 November 2022, with their term beginning on 25 December 2022 and scheduled to run through 2026.

== See also ==
- Penghu County Government
