= Kinmen County Council =

Legislature of Kinmen County, Taiwan

Coordinates: 24.4282°N 118.3231°E

Kinmen County Council 金門縣議會
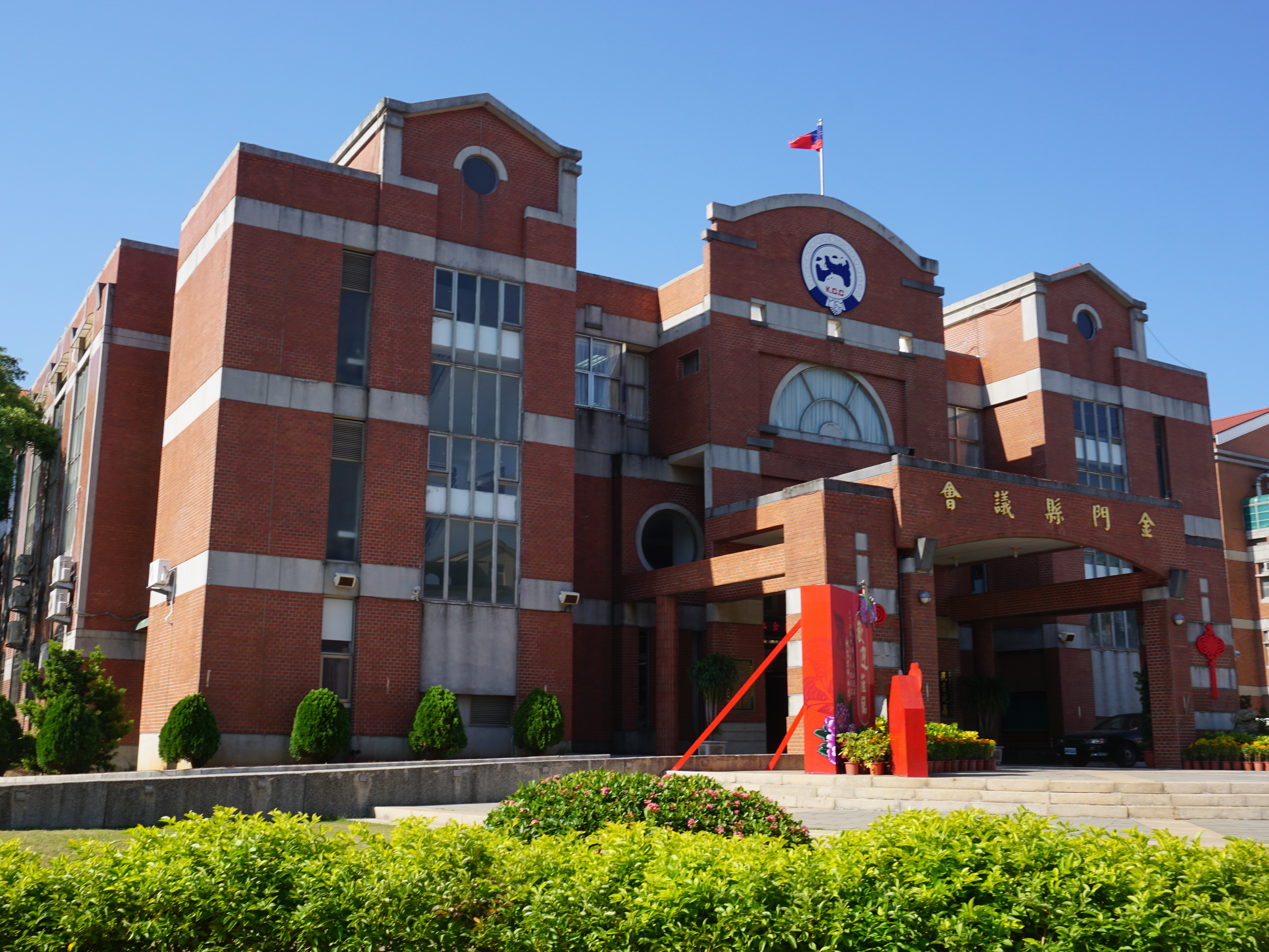

Type
- Type: County Council of Kinmen County

Leadership
- Speaker: Hung Yun-tien, Kuomintang since 2018
- Deputy Speaker: Au Yang Yi-xong, Kuomintang since 2022

Structure
- Seats: 19
- Political groups: KMT (7); Independent (11); Democratic Progressive (1)

Elections
- Voting system: Single non-transferable vote
- Last election: 2022

Meeting place
- Jincheng, Kinmen, Fujian, Republic of China

Website
- Official website (in Chinese)

The Kinmen County Council (KMCC; traditional Chinese: 金門縣議會; simplified Chinese: 金门县议会; pinyin: Jīnmén Xiàn Yìhuì) is the elected county council of Kinmen County, Republic of China. The council composes of 19 councilors lastly elected through the 2022 Republic of China local election on 26 November 2022.

== Speakers ==
- Wang Zai-sheng (KMT) (1 March 2010-25 December 2014)
- Hung Li-ping (KMT) (25 December 2014-24 December 2018)
- Hung Yun-tien (KMT) (25 December 2018-incumbent)

== Deputy Speakers ==
- Xu Jianzhong (KMT) (1 March 2010-25 December 2014)
- Shieh Tung-long (KMT) (25 December 2014-24 December 2018)
- Zhou Zijie (Independent) (25 December 2018-24 December 2022)
- Au Yang Yi-xong (KMT) (25 December 2022-incumbent)

== See also ==
- Kinmen County Government
