= Miaoli County Council =

Council of Miaoli County, Taiwan

Coordinates: 24.5630°N 120.8372°E

Miaoli County Council 苗栗縣議會

Type
- Type: County council

Leadership
- Speaker: Yu Chung-tien
- Deputy Speaker: Chen Ming-chao

Structure
- Seats: 38
- Political groups: KMT (9); DPP (7); NPP (1); Independent (20)

Elections
- Voting system: Single non-transferable vote
- Last election: 2022

Meeting place
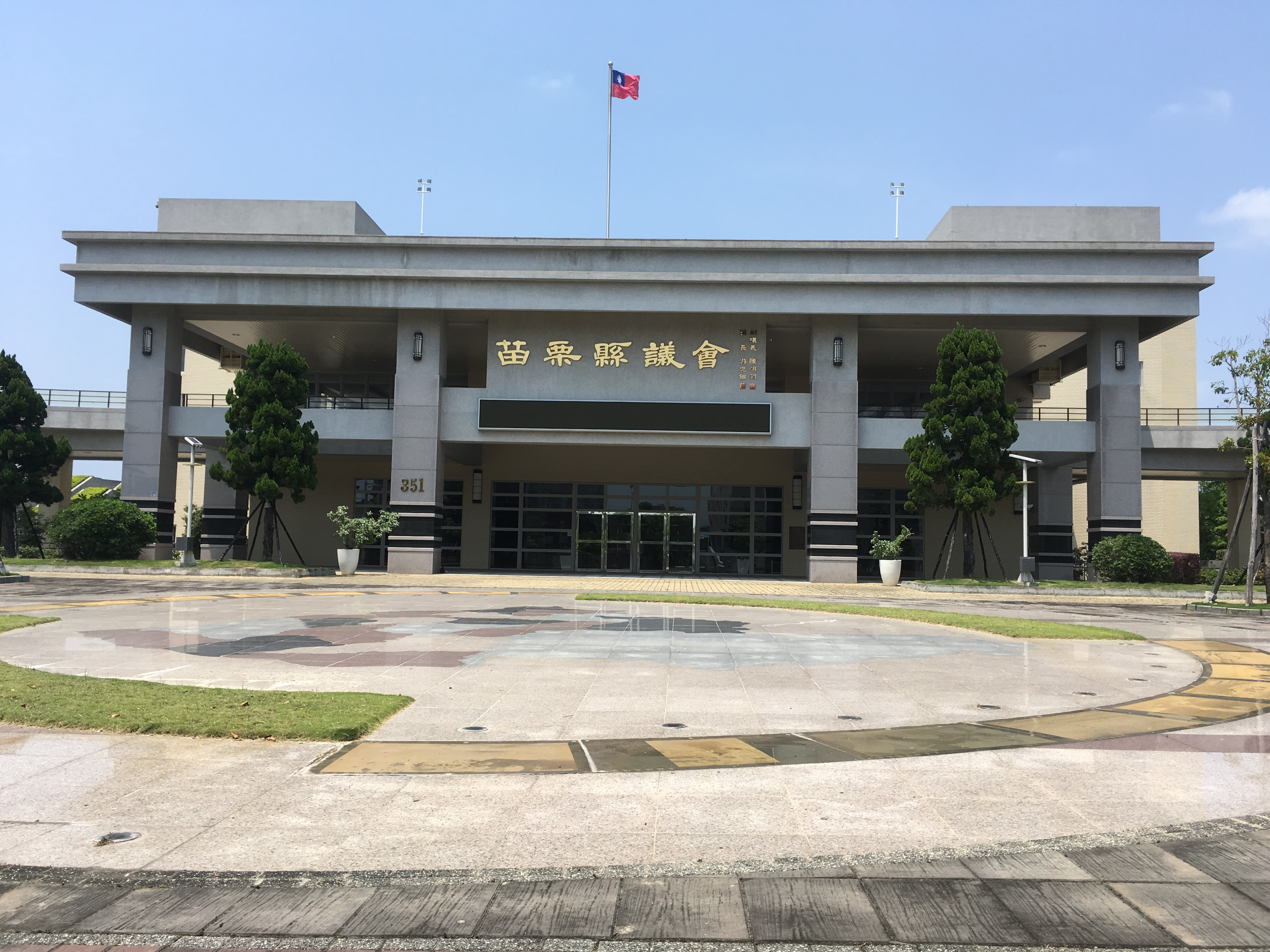
- Miaoli City, Miaoli County, Taiwan

Website
- Official website (in Chinese)

The Miaoli County Council (MCC; traditional Chinese: 苗栗縣議會; simplified Chinese: 苗栗县议会; pinyin: Miáolì Xiàn Yìhuì) is the elected county council of Miaoli County, Republic of China. The council composes of 38 councillors most recently elected in the 2022 Republic of China local elections on 26 November 2022.

== History ==
After the handover of Taiwan from Japan to the Republic of China (ROC) on 25 October 1945, the area of present-day Miaoli County became part of Hsinchu County. In 1950, local self-government was implemented and administrative division of the ROC was adjusted in which Miaoli County was established and subsequently the country government was established on 25 October 1950. On 7 January 1951, the first term of the county councilors were elected and inaugurated on 19 January the same year.

== See also ==
- Miaoli County Government
