= Jianshan =

Jianshan is the atonal pinyin romanization of various Chinese names, chiefly 尖山 ("Pointed Mountain").

It may refer to:

== Mainland China ==
- Jianshan District, Shuangyashan Prefecture, Heilongjiang Province
- Jianshan, Zhejiang in Pan'an County, Jinhua Prefecture, Zhejiang Province
- Jianshan, Jiangxi (建山) in Gao'an, Yichun Prefecture, Jiangxi Province
- Jianshan, Chongqing in Wuxi County, Chongqing
- Jianshan Subdistrict, Tianjin, Hexi District, Tianjin
- Jianshan Village, Yunnan in Shidian County, Baoshan Prefecture, Yunnan Province
- Jianshan Village, Chongqing in Taihe Township, Fengjie County, Chongqing
- Mount Jianshan in the Keluo volcanic range in Heilongjiang Province
- Jianshan Scenic Area in Xinmi, Zhengzhou Prefecture, Henan Province
- Jianshan Temple (鑑山) in Yangshuo County, Guilin Prefecture, Guangxi Province
- Jianshan Dialect, one of the Gelao languages

== Taiwan ==
- Jianshan Village, Huxi in Huxi, Penghu County
- Jianshan Village, Toufen in Toufen, Miaoli County
- Central Range Point in Hualien County, Taiwan, China, known as Jianshan in Chinese
- Mount Jianshan (劍山) in the Xueshan Range in central Taiwan
- Chienshan Power Plant in Huxi, Penghu County, romanized as Jianshan in pinyin
- Longmen Jianshan Pier in Huxi, Penghu County

== Hong Kong ==
- Eagle's Nest, Sha Tin District, New Territories, a mountain also known as Tsim Shan in Cantonese and Jianshan in Mandarin
