= Longgui Park =

- 隆貴公園
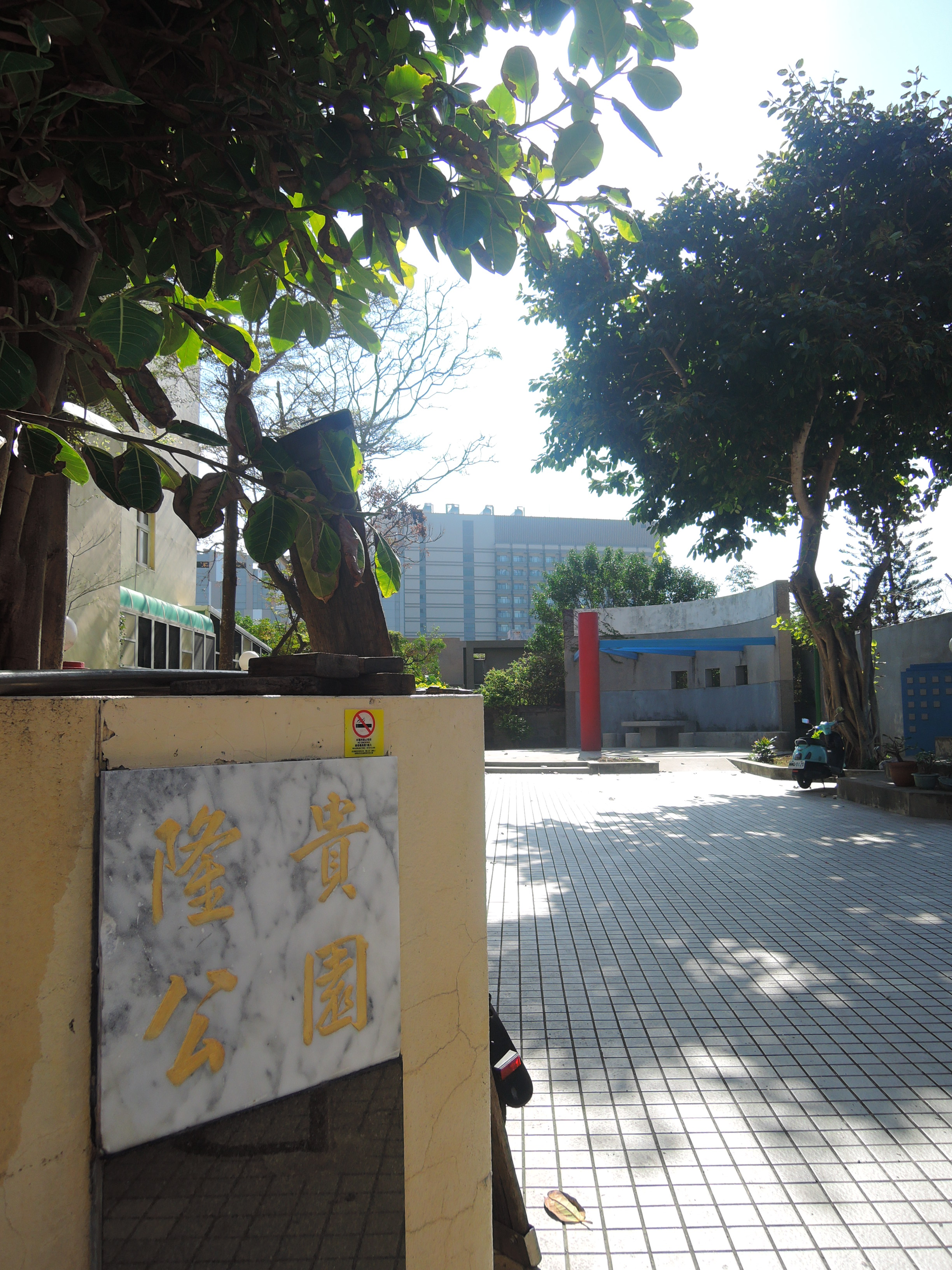
- Interactive map of Longgui Park
- Location: The intersection of Xinshen Rd and Xincun Rd, Guangfu District, Magong City, Penghu County 880
- Coordinates: 23°34′08″N 119°34′15″E
- Area: 380 m^{2} (4,100 sq ft)
- Created: July 20, 2001
- Founder: Lai Feng-wei
- Open: All year
- Budget: NTD 880,000

Longgui Park (traditional Chinese: 隆貴公園; simplified Chinese: 隆贵公园; pinyin: Lóngguì Gōngyuán) is a park in Guangfu Village (Chinese: 光復里), Magong City, Penghu County, Taiwan. It is a small community park of 380 hectares (940 acres) and was founded on July 20, 2001 by Lai Feng-wei, the magistrate of Penghu.

In 2018, the Penghu County Government planned to spend NTD 25,820,000 to demolish the park for a new road, which triggered a protest by several of local residents.

== History ==
Longgui Park is located in Guangfu village, Magong City, next to an abandoned power plant. It was completed on July 20, 2001 and cost NTD 880,000. It was named after Deng Long-gui (Chinese: 鄧隆貴) who contributed to the construction of the park. Longgui Park is one of few community parks in downtown Magong, and it is also a friendly shelter to feral cats.

== Road dispute ==
=== Background ===
During the period of magistrate Wang Chien-fa's term (2005-2014), county council member Chen Hai-shan (Chinese: 陳海山) proposed to open a new road from Xincun Road (Chinese: 新村路) to Haipu Road (Chinese: 海埔路), running through Longgui Park and the nearby abandoned Taiwan Power Company power station.

In 2015, Ou Zhi-cheng (Chinese: 歐致誠), the Penghu power station plant manager, proposed preservation of the power station buildings. Chen Hai-shan rejected this, saying "There is not any reason to preserve Magong power station because I cannot tell any kind feature of it." He insisted on demolishing the plant and Longgui Park for construction of the new road.

Penghu County Government and Taiwan Power Company negotiated that the company would release the land on November 8, 2016.

In early October 2017, county executive Chen Kuang-fu promised that "The project of opening a road from Xincun Road to Haipu Road" must begin the next March.

However, by June 2018 the project had not started. County council member Chen Hai-shan asked Hsueh Hung-ying (Chinese: 薛宏營, the director of Penghu county government economic affairs department) to execute the project as soon as possible. "If county council could agree to afford the advance payment (NTD 25,820,000), we might start the construction in August." Hsueh replied. Chen Hai-shan promised Hsueh the advance payment would be approved in the session, but if it didn't, construction should still start. "We'll see about that!" Chen Hai-shan threatened.

=== Protests ===
Local politician Sheng Yi-che (Chinese: 冼義哲) and residents from Guangfu village staged a protest of the project on July 31, 2018. They held a press conference and declared their dissatisfaction to the Penghu County Government. They reasoned that Baichen Street (Chinese: 北辰街) already connects Xinsheng Road (Chinese: 新生路) with the Haipu Road (Chinese: 海埔路), is 14-metre (46 ft) wide and is just 120 metres (390 ft) from Xincun Road (Chinese: 新村路). "This project is very ridiculous and unacceptable! It is unnecessary to spend about 2,600 million dollars destroying a community park and an abandoned plant just for expand Xincun Road!" Said by Sheng Yi-che.

"It is nonsense! We won't execute this project on August 15" replied Lin Wen-zao (Chinese: 林文藻), the vice manager of the county government economic affairs department.

On August 7, 2018, Penghu County Government announced Lu Chun-tian (Chinese: 盧春田) would replace Hsueh Hung-ying as the manager of Penghu county government economic affairs department.
