= Lii Wen =

Taiwanese politician and journalist (born 1989)

- 李問
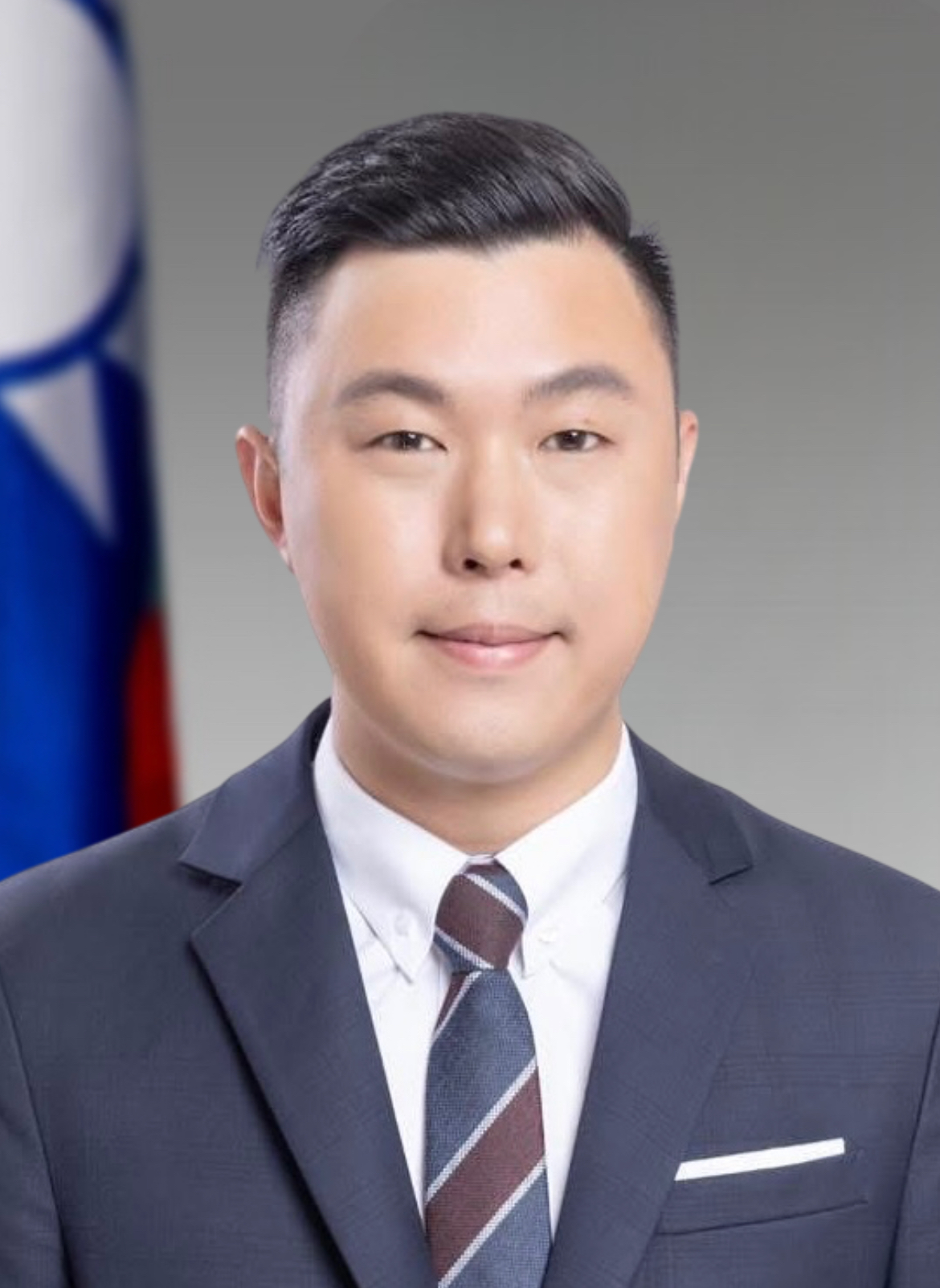
- Official portrait, 2025

Deputy Secretary-General of the National Security Council
- Incumbent
- Assumed office 1 September 2025 Serving with Lin Fei-fan, Vincent Chao
- President: Lai Ching-te
- Preceded by: Liu Te-chin

7th Spokesperson of the Office of the President
- In office 20 May 2024 – 1 September 2025 Serving with Karen Kuo
- President: Lai Ching-te
- Preceded by: Olivia Lin

Personal details
- Born: 4 March 1989 (age 37) Hsinchu, Taiwan
- Education: National Taiwan University (BS); University of Chicago (MA)

Lii Wen (Chinese: 李問; born 4 March 1989) is a Taiwanese journalist and politician who has been deputy secretary-general of the National Security Council since 2025. He was formerly a spokesperson for the Office of the President under President Lai Ching-te responsible for international media relations. From 2020 to 2024, Lii was the first director of the Democratic Progressive Party's local chapter in the Matsu Islands.

== Early life and education ==
Lii was born in Hsinchu, Taiwan, on 4 March 1989. His father, Lii Ding-tzann, is a professor at National Tsing Hua University.

Lii graduated from National Taiwan University with a Bachelor of Arts in anthropology and earned a Master of Arts (MA) in social science from the University of Chicago. As an undergraduate, Lii participated in fieldwork in China, Taiwan, and across Southeast Asia and also worked for the news magazine NTU Consciousness.

== Career ==
After finishing his master's degree, Lii gave up dual American citizenship and returned to Taiwan to complete his military service, citing his experience of nearly getting arrested by police in China during his graduate fieldwork studies as contributing to his decision to return to Taiwan. From 2014 to 2015, Lii worked as a news reporter for the English-language Taipei Times.

Lii worked for the Democratic Progressive Party during President Tsai Ing-wen's 2016 presidential campaign, specializing in international outreach and foreign policy, including work on the New Southbound Policy to strengthen Taiwan's ties with Southeast Asia and South Asia. He later also worked at Taiwan's National Security Council. Lii subsequently became a spokesperson for the DPP in 2019.

During his tenure as spokesperson, Lii accompanied DPP delegations on international visits, including a visit to Washington D.C. accompanying then-Chairman Cho Jung-tai, as well as a delegation visiting the Dalai Lama and the Central Tibetan Administration in Dharamshala, India.

=== 2020 Legislative Campaign ===
Following the 2018 Taiwanese local elections, the Democratic Progressive Party asked Lii to consider running for any Legislative Yuan seat in Taipei or New Taipei deemed primarily pan-blue. He rejected the suggestion and sought to run in an even more difficult district, the offshore island constituency of the Matsu Islands.

In September 2019, Lii duly accepted the DPP nomination for the Legislative Yuan in Lienchiang County, becoming the first Democratic Progressive legislative candidate there since Tsao Cheng-ti in 2008. He finished third in the 2020 legislative election, behind incumbent Chen Hsueh-sheng and former lawmaker Tsao Erh-chung. Although he lost, Lii's campaign set a record for DPP-affiliated vote share in a Matsu legislative election at 11 percent.

Described by the media as an "unlikely politician," Lii's campaign was noted for a slim chance of victory in a constituency known as a KMT stronghold, but attracted attention for using military imagery, considered rare for a DPP candidate. He also wore a large balloon advertising his campaign, as well as gloves resembling lobster claws, and a winged mussel costume to draw attention to aquaculture in Lienchiang County.

=== 2022 Magistrate Campaign ===
In July 2020, Lii became the founding director of the DPP chapter in the Matsu Islands, which was previously the last remaining constituency in the country without a local DPP office. Following a recruitment campaign to increase party membership, he served as director of the Matsu Islands chapter from 2020 to 2024. As director, Lii worked on issues related to the protection of maritime environment and infrastructure such as submarine cables, writing about damages caused by Chinese sand-mining vessels and fishing boats.

Lii then worked to nominate the first Matsu-based DPP candidates for local political office in the 2022 local elections. His campaign for the Lienchiang County magistracy in the 2022 local election featured an inflatable fish, representing the yellow croaker. Lii, who was the first DPP nominee for the Lienchiang magistracy, finished behind two Kuomintang candidates, Wang Chung-ming and Tsao Erh-yuan.

=== 2024 Legislative Campaign ===
Lii launched his second legislative campaign in November 2023, again facing Chen Hsueh-sheng, as well as Taiwan People's Party candidate Tsao Erh-kai. Lii finished second in this race, garnering 1,382 votes (23%) in the January 2024 election, finishing behind incumbent Chen Hsueh-sheng (3,116) and ahead of Tsao Erh-kai (1,373).

=== International Affairs Department ===
In February 2024, Lii was named head of the DPP's international affairs department. He stated a willingness to facilitate exchanges with political parties, think tanks, and civil society, to inspire Taiwanese youth to participate in global affairs. He represented the DPP in expressing support for Ukraine, attending a rally on the second anniversary of the full-scale invasion.

=== Presidential Office ===
With the presidential inauguration of Lai Ching-te in May 2024, Lii joined the Lai administration as spokesperson, responsible for international media relations. In September 2025, Lii was named a deputy secretary-general of the National Security Council.

== Publications ==
=== Articles ===
- Taiwan’s commitment to regional peace is strong and enduring, the Washington Times, May 18, 2025.
- After Chinese Vessels Cut Matsu Internet Cables, Taiwan Seeks to Improve Its Communications Resilience, the Diplomat, April 15, 2023.
- Skepticism Toward U.S. Support for Taiwan Harms Regional Security, the National Interest (co-authored with Lin Fei-fan), March 15, 2023.
- Reaching Beyond Traditional Voting Blocs: Taiwan's DPP Launches Campaign in the Matsu Islands, Taiwan Insight, March 30, 2022.
- Chinese Overfishing Highlights Environmental Crisis in the Taiwan Strait, the Diplomat, October 28, 2021.
- Challenging Ethnonationalism from the Matsu Islands, 9DASHLINE, March 25, 2021.
- Edge of Democracy: China’s Influence on Taiwan’s "Frontline" Islands, 9DASHLINE, January 25, 2021.
- From Taiwan to the Philippines, Chinese Illegal Dredging Ships Wreak Environmental Havoc, the Diplomat, August 12, 2020.
- Taiwan Voices Support for Uyghurs in China, the Diplomat, May 2, 2019.
- Taiwan's "Silk Road of Democracy", the Diplomat, August 16, 2019.
- Taiwan and Hong Kong commemorate Tiananmen and oppose the Extradition Bill together 紀念六四不止息，台港同反送中例, Hong Kong Apple Daily, June 4, 2019.

=== Books ===
- Great Heroes of the Northern Seas 北海大英雄 - bilingual picture book (by Liu Pi-yun, translation by Lii Wen), Linking Publishing Company, June 2022.
- Deciphering Southeast Asia's Economy through Maps 用地圖看懂東南亞經濟 (co-authored by 6 authors), Business Weekly, July 2019.
