= List of magistrates and mayors in Taiwan =

A map showing political parties of magistrates and mayors in Taiwan as of Dec. 25, 2022 Democratic Progressive Party Independent Kuomintang Taiwan People's Party

This article lists the current magistrates and mayors, the head of government, of the primary administrative divisions of the Republic of China (Taiwan). Following the dissolution of the provincial governments in 2018 after the 1998 streamlining of its provinces, local autonomous bodies including the 6 special municipalities and 2 titular provinces along with 13 counties and 3 autonomous municipalities are directly administered by the central government (Executive Yuan) according to the Local Government Act. Executive branch of the local autonomous bodies are led by a mayor or magistrate. Each mayor or magistrate is elected by the population of their corresponding division with a maximum term of four years and the possibility of reelection to one more term.

Currently, except for Hsinchu City all of the mayors of special municipalities and provincial cities and all of the county magistrates in the republic have won in the 2022 mayoral and magistratical elections and were sworn into office on 25 December 2022. Of the twenty-two current incumbents, nine are women—Lu Shiow-yen in Taichung City and Huang Min-hui in Chiayi City, as well as all seven magistrates for counties in central Taiwan and along the east coast. Yang Wen-ke of Hsinchu County is the oldest official (74 years, 271 days of age), while Hsinchu City's Andy Chiu is the youngest (44 years, 7 days old). Fourteen incumbents belong to the Kuomintang, five from the Democratic Progressive Party, two from the Taiwan People's Party, and one is non-partisan.

== Magistrates and mayors ==
Colour key for parties
Democratic Progressive Party
Kuomintang
Taiwan People's Party
Independent

Office and division (past officeholders)	Name	Portrait	Date of birth (Age)	Party	Ref
Mayor of New Taipei City (list)	Hou You-yi	Mayor Hou You-yi	7 June 1957 (68 years, 194 days)	Kuomintang	
Mayor of Taipei City (list)	Chiang Wan-an		26 December 1978 (46 years, 357 days)	Kuomintang	
Mayor of Taoyuan City (list)	Chang San-cheng	Mayor Chang San-cheng	24 June 1954 (71 years, 177 days)	Kuomintang	
Mayor of Taichung City (list)	Lu Shiow-yen	Mayor Lu Shiow-yen	31 August 1961 (64 years, 109 days)	Kuomintang	
Mayor of Tainan City (list)	Huang Wei-cher	Mayor Huang Wei-cher	26 September 1963 (62 years, 83 days)	Democratic Progressive Party	
Mayor of Kaohsiung City (list)	Chen Chi-mai	Mayor Chen Chi-mai	23 December 1964 (60 years, 360 days)	Democratic Progressive Party	
Acting Magistrate of Yilan County (list)	Lin Mao-sheng		1967 (age 57–58)	Independent	
Magistrate of Hsinchu County (list)	Yang Wen-ke	Magistrate Yang Wen-ke	22 March 1951 (74 years, 271 days)	Kuomintang	
Magistrate of Miaoli County (list)	Chung Tung-chin	Magistrate Chung Tung-chin	2 January 1963 (62 years, 350 days)	Independent	
Magistrate of Changhua County (list)	Wang Huei-mei	Magistrate Wang Huei-mei	22 November 1968 (57 years, 26 days)	Kuomintang	
Magistrate of Nantou County (list)	Hsu Shu-hua	Magistrate Hsu Shu-hua	15 October 1975 (50 years, 64 days)	Kuomintang	
Magistrate of Yunlin County (list)	Chang Li-shan	Magistrate Chang Li-shan	1 January 1964 (61 years, 351 days)	Kuomintang	
Magistrate of Chiayi County (list)	Weng Chang-liang	Magistrate Weng Chang-liang	19 March 1965 (60 years, 274 days)	Democratic Progressive Party	
Magistrate of Pingtung County (list)	Chou Chun-mi	Magistrate Chou Chun-mi	1 November 1966 (59 years, 47 days)	Democratic Progressive Party	
Magistrate of Taitung County (list)	April Yao	Magistrate April Yao	23 November 1969 (56 years, 25 days)	Kuomintang	
Magistrate of Hualien County (list)	Hsu Chen-wei	Magistrate Hsu Chen-wei	12 October 1968 (57 years, 67 days)	Kuomintang	
Magistrate of Penghu County (list)	Chen Kuang-fu	Magistrate Chen Kuang-fu	25 October 1955 (70 years, 54 days)	Democratic Progressive Party	
Mayor of Keelung City (list)	George Hsieh	Magistrate George Hsieh	5 October 1975 (50 years, 74 days)	Kuomintang	
Mayor of Hsinchu City (list)	Ann Kao	Mayor Ann Kao	25 January 1984 (41 years, 327 days)	Independent	
Mayor of Chiayi City (list)	Huang Min-hui	Mayor Huang Min-hui	20 January 1959 (66 years, 332 days)	Kuomintang	
Magistrate of Kinmen County (list)	Chen Fu-hai	Magistrate Chen Fu-hai	3 June 1963 (62 years, 198 days)	Taiwan People's Party	
Magistrate of Lienchiang County (list)	Wang Chung-ming	Magistrate Wang Chung-ming	27 February 1958 (67 years, 294 days)	Kuomintang	

== See also ==
- Administrative divisions of Taiwan
- List of administrative divisions of Taiwan
- Elections in Taiwan
- Politics of the Republic of China
