= Liu Cheng-ying =

Taiwanese politician

- 劉增應
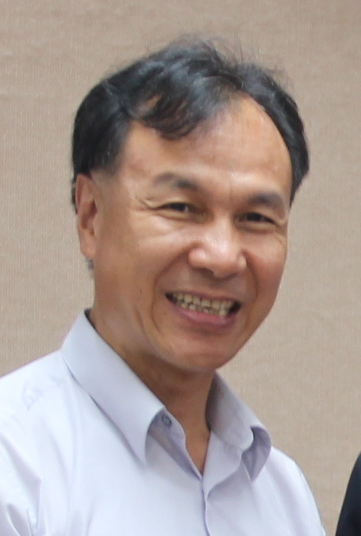
- Liu in 2016

Magistrate of Lienchiang County
- In office 25 December 2014 – 25 December 2022
- Deputy: Wang Chung-ming
- Preceded by: Yang Sui-sheng
- Succeeded by: Wang Chung-ming

Personal details
- Born: 24 August 1958 (age 67) Lienchiang, Fujian
- Party: Kuomintang
- Education: Taipei Medical University (MB); National Taiwan University (MS)

Liu Cheng-ying (Chinese: 劉增應; pinyin: Liú Zēngyīng; Wade–Giles: Liu^{2} Tsêng^{1}-ying^{1}; Foochow Romanized: Làu Cĕng-éng; born 24 August 1958) is a Taiwanese politician who was the Magistrate of Lienchiang County from 25 December 2014 until 25 December 2022.

== Education ==
Liu graduated from Taipei Medical University with a Bachelor of Medicine (M.B.) and earned a Master of Science (M.S.) in preventive healthcare from National Taiwan University.

== Early careers ==
Liu had been a doctor and the director of Lienchiang County Hospital.

== Magistrate of Lienchiang County ==
=== 2014 Magistrate election campaign ===
During the campaign for the 2014 Lienchiang County magistrate election at the end of 2014, Liu's campaign focused on the policies to improve the traffic and tourism in Matsu Islands. Liu was elected as the Magistrate of Lienchiang County from Kuomintang (KMT) after winning Lienchiang Magistrate election held on 29 November 2014, defeating fellow KMT and incumbent Magistrate Yang Sui-sheng.

2014 Lienchiang County Magistrate Election Result
No.	Candidate	Party	Votes	Percentage
1	Liu Cheng-ying	KMT	4,385	66.25%
2	Yang Sui-sheng	KMT	2,234	33.75%

=== 2015 Mawei-Matsu Lantern Festival ===
Speaking at the opening ceremony of the 13th Mawei-Matsu Lantern Festival held in Mawei District, Fuzhou, Fujian on 2 March 2015, Liu said that the festival had provided a great platform for cross-strait exchanges. He added that both Mawei and Matsu have similar culture, dialects and lifestyle, thus cooperation and exchanges should be strengthen, saying that more favorable policies will be introduced in the future to attract more visitors from Mainland China to visit Matsu.

=== 2016 Mainland China visit ===
In September 2016, Liu with another seven magistrates and mayors from Taiwan visited Beijing, which were Hsu Yao-chang (Magistrate of Miaoli County), Chiu Ching-chun (Magistrate of Hsinchu County), Yeh Hui-ching (Deputy Mayor of New Taipei City), Chen Chin-hu (Deputy Magistrate of Taitung County), Lin Ming-chen (Magistrate of Nantou County), Fu Kun-chi (Magistrate of Hualien County) and Wu Cherng-dean (Deputy Magistrate of Kinmen County). Their visit was aimed to reset and restart cross-strait relations after President Tsai Ing-wen took office on 20 May 2016. The eight local leaders reiterated their support of One-China policy under the 1992 consensus. They met with Taiwan Affairs Office Head Zhang Zhijun and Chairperson of the Chinese People's Political Consultative Conference Yu Zhengsheng.

=== 2018 reelection campaign ===
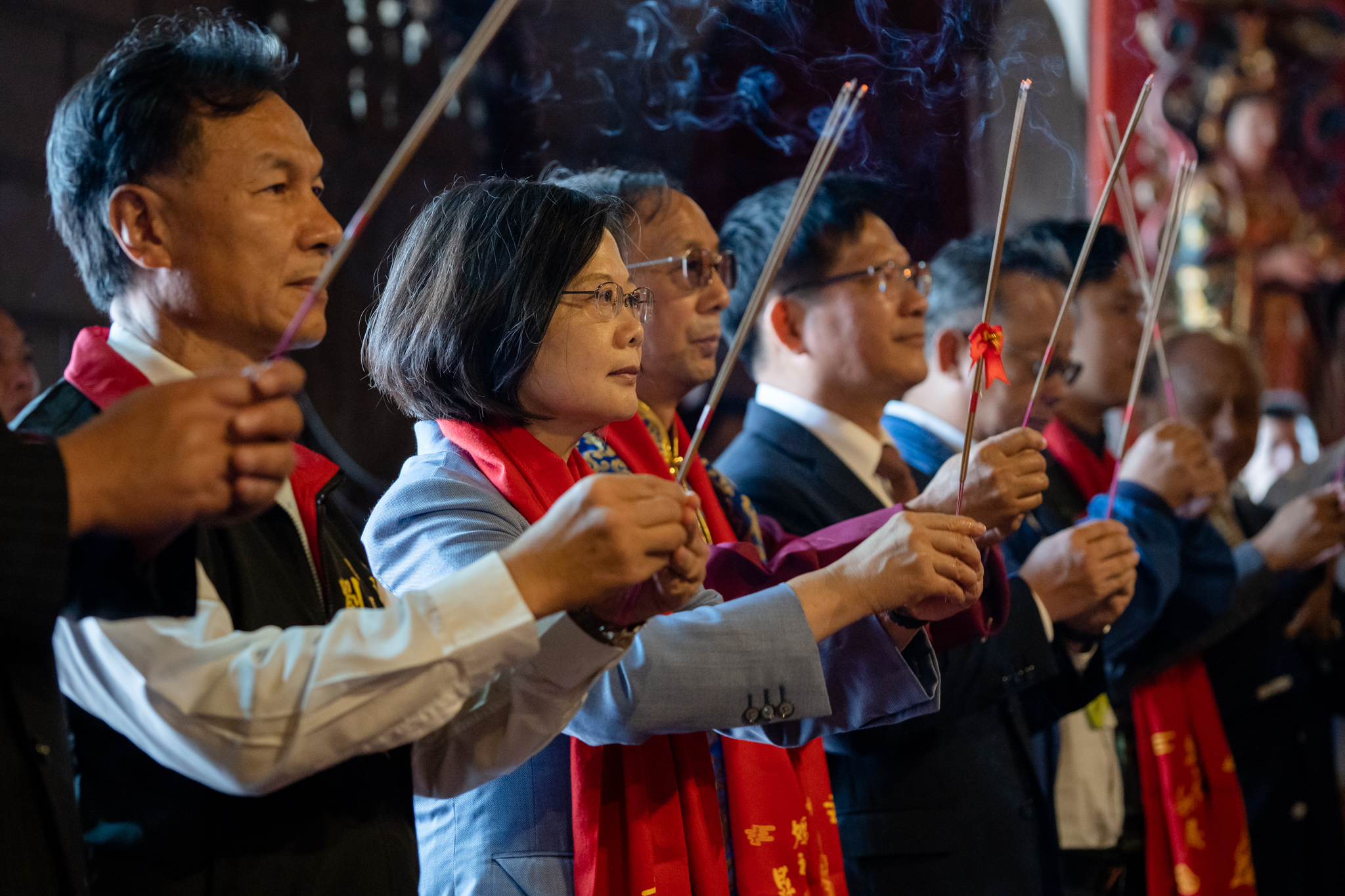
President Tsai Ing-wen and Magistrate Liu Cheng-ying (October 2019)

The Kuomintang endorsed Liu for a second term as Lienchiang County magistrate in December 2017.

2018 Kuomintang Lienchiang County magistrate primary results
Candidates	Place	Result
Liu Cheng-ying	Called In	Walkover

2018 Lienchang County mayoral results
No.	Candidate	Party	Votes	Percentage
1	Su Po-hao (蘇柏豪)	Tree Party	927	12.51%
2	Chu Hsiu-chen (朱秀珍)	Independent	1,284	17.33%
3	Wei Yao-chien	Independent	336	4.54%
4	Liu Cheng-ying	Kuomintang	4,861	65.62%
Total voters			10,773	
Valid votes			7,408	
Invalid votes				
Voter turnout			68.76%	

=== 2019 Mainland China visit ===
On 12 August 2019, Liu, along with Penghu County Magistrate Lai Feng-wei and Kinmen County Magistrate Yang Cheng-wu, visited Beijing and met with Taiwan Affairs Office Director Liu Jieyi requesting mainland China government to lift up individual travel ban of mainland Chinese tourists to the three counties due to the constraint cross-strait relations. The mainland government eventually agreed to lift up the ban on 20 September 2019.

== See also ==
- Matsu Islands
