= Liu Li-chun =

Chinese politician

- In office December 20, 1997 – December 20, 2001
- Preceded by: Cao Chang-shun
- Succeeded by: Chen Hsueh-sheng

Personal details
- Party: Kuomintang
- Spouse: Liu Wan-yu

Liu Li-chun (Chinese: 劉立羣;; born 18 August 1952, death 6 April 2004) was a politician in the Republic of China, hailing from Lienchiang County, Fujian.

== Life and career ==
After graduating from Matsu Junior High School, Liu Li-chun paused his studies for three years to support his family financially, later passing the entrance exam for Matsu High School and subsequently being recommended for Pingtung Agricultural College. He served as the Director of the Lienchiang County Agricultural Improvement Station, the Head of the Construction Section, and the Chief Secretary of the Lienchiang County Government. In the 1997 Republic of China local election, he ran for Lienchiang County Magistrate representing the Kuomintang and was elected with 61.00% of the vote, becoming the 41st magistrate and the second directly elected magistrate of Lienchiang County. However, in the 2001–02 Taiwanese local elections, he was defeated by Chen Hsueh-sheng of the People First Party, failing to secure re-election. After leaving office, Liu Li-chun moved to Taiwan and was later appointed as a full-time member of the Fujian Provincial Government.

On April 6, 2004, he died of liver cancer in Taiwan at National Taiwan University Hospital at the age of 52. On December 30, 2004, then-Presidential Office Secretary-General Su Tseng-chang visited Matsu on behalf of President Chen Shui-bian to present a commendation order to the late former magistrate Liu Li-chun, which was accepted by his wife, Liu Wan-yu.
