= Stella Chen =

Stella Chen may refer to:

- Stella Chen (violinist) (born 1992), American violinist
- Stella Chen (politician) (1950–2005), Taiwanese politician
