= Lin Hui-kuan =

Taiwanese labor unionist and politician

Lin Hui-kuan MLY
- 林惠官

Member of the Legislative Yuan
- In office 1 February 2002 – 31 January 2008
- Constituency: Republic of China

Personal details
- Born: 17 October 1957 Lienchiang County, Republic of China
- Died: 26 August 2009 (aged 51) Zhongzheng, Taipei, Taiwan
- Party: People First Party
- Other political affiliations: Kuomintang (until 2001)
- Education: National Taipei Institute of Technology (BS)

Lin Hui-kuan (Chinese: 林惠官; 17 October 1957 – 26 August 2009) was a Taiwanese labor unionist and politician.

== Early career ==
Lin earned a degree in electrical engineering from National Taipei Institute of Technology.

In the early 2000s, he was president of the Chinese Federation of Labor, one of three national labor unions in Taiwan at the time. In this position, he expressed opposition to flextime and boycotted multiple public hearings organized by the Council of Labor Affairs to discuss the topic. Lin staunchly supported a government proposal to mandate 84 hours of work over two weeks, instead of a 44-hour workweek. While serving on a panel convened by the Economic Development Advisory Conference, he fought to maintain a monthly minimum wage, and rejected an hourly wage proposal that was in discussion. Lin attended the Asian regional meeting of the International Labour Organization in August, the first time representatives of Taiwan were permitted to speak at an ILO gathering. Lin also worked for the Taiwan Railways Administration.

== Political career ==
Lin accepted a 2001 legislative nomination from the People First Party, and was expelled from the Kuomintang. While serving on the Legislative Yuan, Lin retained his position as head of the Chinese Federation of Labour, and vehemently opposed a National Health Insurance rate increase. New rates took effect in September 2002, and in response, Lin asked union members to pay no more than their previous premiums. In November, Lin said of the Bureau of National Health Insurance, "The bureau is neither honest nor trustworthy."

Lin was reelected in 2004 via the party list, and served as PFP caucus whip. He was also named a co-convenor of the Procedure Committee. He contested the Lienchiang County Constituency seat in 2008 against Tsao Erh-chung, and lost. Lin underwent surgery in July 2009. The operation was beset by complications, and he was transferred to National Taiwan University Hospital, where he died of sepsis on 26 August 2009, aged 51. Charges against Lin dating from a 2004 protest were dropped in May 2012, because he had died.
