= Mayor–council government =

Form of local government

A mayor–council government is a system of local government in which a mayor who is directly elected by the voters acts as chief executive, while a separately elected city council constitutes the legislative body. It is one of the two most common forms of local government in the United States, and is the form most frequently adopted in large cities, although the other common form, council–manager government, is the local government form of more municipalities.

== Variations and mayoral power ==
The form may be categorized into two main variations depending on the relative power of the mayor compared to the council, the strong-mayor variant and the weak-mayor variant.

In a typical strong-mayor system, the elected mayor is granted almost total administrative authority with the power to appoint and dismiss department heads, although some city charters or prevailing state law may require council ratification. In such a system, the mayor's administrative staff often prepares the city budget, although that budget must be approved by the council. The mayor may also have veto rights over council votes, with the council able to override such a veto.

Conversely, in a weak-mayor system, the mayor has no formal authority outside the council, serving a largely ceremonial role as council chairperson and is elected by the citizens of the city. The mayor cannot directly appoint or remove officials and lacks veto power over council votes.

== Use across the world ==
Most major North American cities use the strong-mayor form of the mayor–council system, whereas middle-sized and small North American cities tend to use the council–manager system. The system is also commonly in place in Asian countries.

Germany uses a form that resembles the strong-mayor variant. Italy also uses the strong-mayor model system.

The mayor–council government system is also used in some Asian countries.

Mayors in Japan are directly elected, holding significant power, with the directly elected council (assembly) providing a check and balance, operating under central government oversight according to the Japanese Local Autonomy Act (UAL). While the local government has similarities to a strong mayor–council system, and the mayor has veto powers, there are also aspects of the parliamentary form of government; the local assembly can issue a vote of no confidence. If the vote is passed, the mayor will dissolve the assembly and the people will vote in a new one. If this happens a second time and passes, the mayor is removed.

Taiwan's administrative divisions include six special municipalities, including the capital Taipei, which use a mayor-council form of government; counties use a similar system with a chief executive called a magistrate.

== See also ==
- City commission government
- Town meeting
- Strong Mayors, Building Homes Act
