= Yang Sui-sheng =

Taiwanese politician

- 楊綏生
- Official portrait, 2010

43rd Magistrate of Lienchiang
- In office 20 December 2009 – 25 December 2014
- Preceded by: Chen Hsueh-sheng
- Succeeded by: Liu Cheng-ying

Personal details
- Born: 10 November 1954 (age 72) Nangan, Lienchiang, Fujian
- Party: Kuomintang
- Education: Taipei Medical University (MB)

Yang Sui-sheng (Chinese: 楊綏生; pinyin: Yáng Suīshēng; Foochow Romanized: Iòng Chŭi-sĕng; born 10 November 1954) is a Taiwanese politician and physician who was Magistrate of Lienchiang County from 2009 to 2014.

== Early life and education ==
Yang was born in Fujian, China, on November 10, 1954. He later moved to Taiwan and attended medical school at Taipei Medical University, where he earned a Bachelor of Medicine (M.B.) in 1981.

== Lienchiang County Magistrate ==
=== 2009 Lienchiang County Magistrate election ===
Yang was elected as the Magistrate of Lienchiang County after winning the 2009 Republic of China local election under Kuomintang on 5 December 2009 and assumed office on 20 December 2009.

=== Casino in Lienchiang ===
Responding to the referendum result on the establishment of casino in Matsu and that the result showed 56% voted in favor against 42% who opposed in July 2012, Yang said that he welcomed the result, saying that the establishment of casino will bring change for Matsu Islands. It would improve the transportation infrastructure and could bring in more tourists.

In December 2013, he urged the Legislative Yuan to pass the Gaming Act (Chinese: 觀光賭場管理條例) as soon as possible so that it can bring job opportunities to Matsu residents and benefit Taiwan's economy as a whole. He also added that there is an urgency to modernize the transportation infrastructures of the county, such as airports and harbors. However, due to the limited funding by the central government, such a proposal is not yet feasible.

=== 2013 Singapore visit ===
On 28 June 2013, Yang and 16 delegates were welcomed and greeted by the ROC representative to Singapore Hsieh Fa-dah and his staffs at the Taipei Representative Office in Singapore. Both of them discussed the issues of bilateral ties between Taiwan and Singapore concerning urban and industrial developments in Singapore. Yang also elaborated on the future development plans and construction blueprints for Matsu Islands. He hoped that Matsu Islands can follow the success of Singapore of its construction and development of the integrated resorts.

=== 2014 Lienchiang County Magistrate election ===
Yang joined the 2014 Lienchiang County Magistrate election held on 29 November 2014. However, he lost to another Kuomintang candidate Liu Cheng-ying.

2014 Lienchiang County Magistrate Election Result
No.	Candidate	Party	Votes	Percentage
1	Liu Cheng-ying	KMT	4,385	66.25%
2	Yang Sui-sheng	KMT	2,234	33.75%

== Personal life ==
In 1996, while he was flying to Matsu Nangan Airport on Nangan Island, the airplane made an emergency landing at sea due to bad weather. A doctor by profession, Yang and his wife assisted the other passengers. From this experience, Yang began focusing his time on improving transportation infrastructure.
