= Qingluo Wetland =

Wetland in Huxi, Penghu, Taiwan

- 青螺濕地 (Chinese)
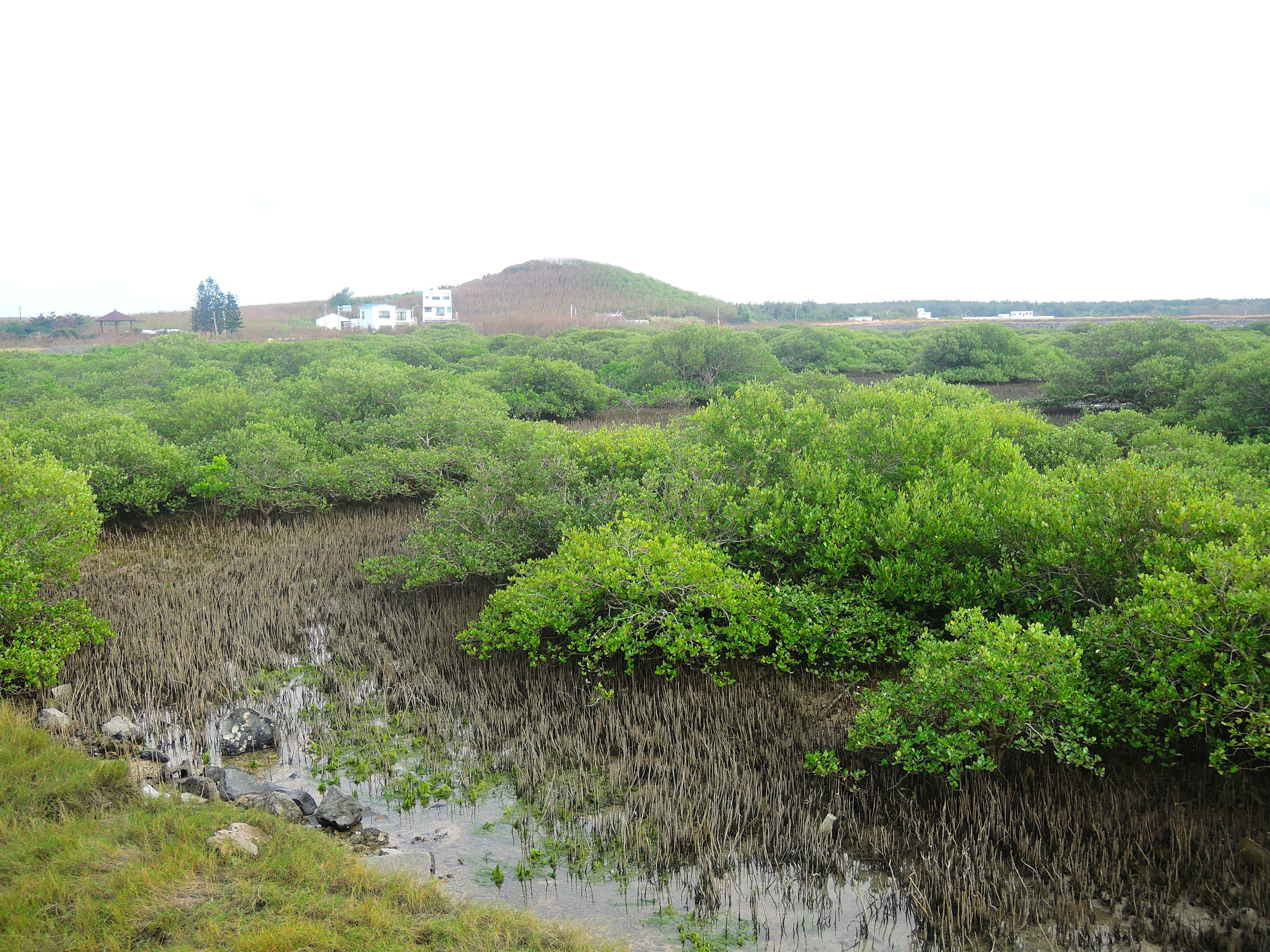

- Location within Penghu County
- Location: Huxi, Penghu, Taiwan
- Coordinates: 23°35′53.3″N 119°38′50.5″E
- Type: wetland
- Surface area: 250 hectares (620 acres)

Aogu Wetland (traditional Chinese: 青螺濕地; simplified Chinese: 青螺湿地; pinyin: Qīngluó Shīdì) is a wetland in Huxi Township, Penghu County, Taiwan.

== Geology ==
The wetland is located on Mount Luojing. It spans over an area of 250 hectares. It is made of various different landscapes, such as gravel, sand, mud, reefs etc.

== See also ==
- List of tourist attractions in Taiwan
