= Lienchiang County Constituency =

Constituency of the Legislative Yuan of Taiwan

- Single-member constituency for the Legislative Yuan
- District(s): Lienchiang County
- Electorate: 11,640

Current constituency
- Created: 1992
- Party: KMT
- Member: Chen Hsueh-sheng

Lienchiang County Constituency (Chinese: 連江縣選舉區, pinyin: Liánjiāng Xiàn Xuǎnjǔ Qū) is one of the 73 regional constituencies represented in the Legislative Yuan, the national legislature of Taiwan. It was created in 1992 following a series of constitutional reforms, and elects one legislator, through first-past-the-post voting, to the Legislative Yuan. It has been represented by Chen Hsueh-sheng of the Kuomintang since 2012.

== Legislators ==
| Election | Legislator | Party |
|---|---|---|
| 1992 - 2001 | Tsao Erh-chung | Kuomintang |
| 2001 - 2004 | Tsao Yuan-chang | People First Party |
| 2004 - 2008 | Tsao Erh-chung | Independent |
| 2008 - 2012 | Tsao Erh-chung | Kuomintang |
| 2012 - 2016 | Chen Hsueh-sheng | Independent |
| 2016 | Chen Hsueh-sheng | Kuomintang |

== Election results ==

=== 1995 ===
* denotes the incumbent legislator

1995 Taiwanese legislative election: Lienchiang
| Candidate | Party | Votes | % |
|---|---|---|---|
| Tsao Erh-chung* | Kuomintang | 1,743 | 55.99 |
| Tsao Yuan-chang | New Party | 1,332 | 42.79 |
| Wei Yao-chien | Democratic Progressive Party | 33 | 1.06 |
| Chen Yuan-chi | Independent | 5 | 0.16 |
| Total | | 3,113 | 100.00 |
| Valid votes | | 3,113 | 98.73 |
| Invalid/blank votes | | 40 | 1.27 |
| Total votes | | 3,153 | 100.00 |
| Registered voters/turnout | | 3,781 | 83.39 |
| Majority | | 411 | 13.2 |
| Kuomintang hold | | | |

=== 1998 ===
* denotes the incumbent legislator

1998 Taiwanese legislative election: Lienchiang
| Candidate | Party | Votes | % | +/– |
|---|---|---|---|---|
| Tsao Erh-chung* | Kuomintang | 2,443 | 100.00 | ▲44.01 |
| Total | | 2,443 | 100.00 | – |
| Valid votes | | 2,443 | 88.68 | |
| Invalid/blank votes | | 312 | 11.32 | |
| Total votes | | 2,755 | 100.00 | |
| Registered voters/turnout | | 4,734 | 58.20 | |
| Majority | | 2,443 | 100 | |
| Kuomintang hold | | | | |

=== 2001 ===
* denotes the incumbent legislator

2001 Taiwanese legislative election: Lienchiang
| Candidate | Party | Votes | % | +/– |
|---|---|---|---|---|
| Tsao Yuan-chang | People First Party | 2,566 | 56.37 | NEW |
| Tsao Erh-chung* | Kuomintang | 1,986 | 43.63 | ▼56.37 |
| Total | | 4,552 | 100.00 | – |
| Valid votes | | 4,552 | 97.45 | |
| Invalid/blank votes | | 119 | 2.55 | |
| Total votes | | 4,671 | 100.00 | |
| Registered voters/turnout | | 6,209 | 75.23 | |
| Majority | | 580 | 12.74 | |
| People First Party gain from Kuomintang | | | | |

=== 2004 ===
* denotes the incumbent legislator

2004 Taiwanese legislative election: Lienchiang
| Candidate | Party | Votes | % | +/– |
|---|---|---|---|---|
| Tsao Erh-chung | Independent | 2,504 | 56.26 | NEW |
| Tsao Yuan-chang* | People First Party | 1,751 | 39.34 | ▼17.03 |
| Lin Huo-meng | Democratic Progressive Party | 196 | 4.40 | NEW |
| Total | | 4,451 | 100.00 | – |
| Valid votes | | 4,451 | 98.96 | |
| Invalid/blank votes | | 47 | 1.04 | |
| Total votes | | 4,498 | 100.00 | |
| Registered voters/turnout | | 6,957 | 64.65 | |
| Majority | | 753 | 16.92 | |
| Independent gain from People First Party | | | | |

=== 2008 ===
* denotes the incumbent legislator

2008 Taiwanese legislative election: Lienchiang
| Candidate | Party | Votes | % | +/– |
|---|---|---|---|---|
| Tsao Erh-chung* | Kuomintang | 2,182 | 49.73 | NEW |
| Lin Hui-kuan | People First Party | 2,064 | 47.04 | ▲7.70 |
| Tsao Cheng-ti | Democratic Progressive Party | 142 | 3.24 | ▼1.16 |
| Total | | 4,388 | 100.00 | – |
| Valid votes | | 4,388 | 98.36 | |
| Invalid/blank votes | | 73 | 1.64 | |
| Total votes | | 4,461 | 100.00 | |
| Registered voters/turnout | | 7,665 | 58.20 | |
| Majority | | 118 | 2.69 | |
| Kuomintang gain from Independent | | | | |

=== 2012 ===
* denotes the incumbent legislator

2012 Taiwanese legislative election: Lienchiang
| Candidate | Party | Votes | % | +/– |
|---|---|---|---|---|
| Chen Hsueh-sheng | Independent | 2,528 | 49.99 | NEW |
| Tsao Erh-chung* | Kuomintang | 2,361 | 46.69 | ▼3.04 |
| Chen Tsai-neng | Independent | 168 | 3.32 | NEW |
| Total | | 5,057 | 100.00 | – |
| Valid votes | | 5,057 | 98.08 | |
| Invalid/blank votes | | 99 | 1.92 | |
| Total votes | | 5,156 | 100.00 | |
| Registered voters/turnout | | 7,772 | 66.34 | |
| Independent gain from Kuomintang | | | | |

=== 2016 ===
* denotes the incumbent legislator

2016 Taiwanese legislative election: Lienchiang
| Candidate | Party | Votes | % | +/– |
|---|---|---|---|---|
| Chen Hsueh-sheng* | Kuomintang | 2,927 | 68.07 | ▲21.38 |
| Lin Chin-kuan | Independent | 760 | 17.67 | NEW |
| Su Pai-hao | Trees Party | 506 | 11.77 | NEW |
| Chang Chun-pao | Chinese Unification Promotion Party | 107 | 2.49 | NEW |
| Total | | 4,300 | 100.00 | – |
| Valid votes | | 4,300 | 96.89 | |
| Invalid/blank votes | | 138 | 3.11 | |
| Total votes | | 4,438 | 100.00 | |
| Registered voters/turnout | | 9,921 | 44.73 | |
| Kuomintang hold | | | | |

=== 2020 ===
* denotes the incumbent legislator

2020 Taiwanese legislative election: Lienchiang
| Candidate | Party | Votes | % | +/– |
|---|---|---|---|---|
| Chen Hsueh-sheng* | Kuomintang | 2,938 | 48.97 | ▼19.10 |
| Tsao Erh-chung | Independent | 2,198 | 36.63 | NEW |
| Li Wen | Democratic Progressive Party | 706 | 11.77 | NEW |
| Wang Chang-ming | Independent | 152 | 2.53 | NEW |
| Li Ko-kun | Congress Party Alliance | 6 | 0.10 | NEW |
| Total | | 6,000 | 100.00 | – |
| Valid votes | | 6,000 | 98.86 | |
| Invalid/blank votes | | 69 | 1.14 | |
| Total votes | | 6,069 | 100.00 | |
| Registered voters/turnout | | 10,583 | 57.35 | |
| Kuomintang hold | | | | |

=== 2024 ===
* denotes the incumbent legislator

2024 Taiwanese legislative election: Lienchiang
| Candidate | Party | Votes | % | +/– |
|---|---|---|---|---|
| Chen Hsueh-sheng* | Kuomintang | 3,118 | 53.08 | ▲4.11 |
| Li Wen | Democratic Progressive Party | 1,382 | 23.53 | ▲11.76 |
| Tsao Erh-kai | Taiwan People's Party | 1,374 | 23.39 | NEW |
| Total | | 5,874 | 100.00 | – |
| Valid votes | | 5,874 | 97.49 | |
| Invalid/blank votes | | 151 | 2.51 | |
| Total votes | | 6,025 | 100.00 | |
| Registered voters/turnout | | 11,640 | 51.76 | |
| Kuomintang hold | | | | |
