= Payen Talu =

Taiwanese politician

Payen Talu MLY
- 巴燕·達魯
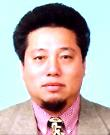
- Payen Talu in the Third Legislative Yuan

Member of the Legislative Yuan
- In office 1 February 1996 – 31 January 2002
- Constituency: Republic of China

Personal details
- Born: 16 December 1951 (age 74)
- Party: Democratic Progressive Party

Payen Talu (traditional Chinese: 巴燕·達魯; simplified Chinese: 巴燕·达鲁; pinyin: Bāyān·Dálǔ; born 16 December 1951) is an Atayal Taiwanese politician. He represented the Democratic Progressive Party as a member of the Legislative Yuan from 1996 to 2002.

== Political career ==
A member of the Democratic Progressive Party, Payen Talu was elected to the Legislative Yuan via party list proportional representation in 1995 and 1998. During his legislative term, Payen Talu frequently defended indigenous rights, particularly the right of ownership to ancestral lands. In 2000, Payen Talu criticized the government's policies on languages and the commemoration of the Wushe Incident for minimizing indigenous cultures. Payen Talu did not garner enough support in an April 2001 party primary to be placed on the Democratic Progressive Party closed list ballot, and instead contested the multimember Highland Aborigine district in the December legislative elections, which he lost.

== Activism ==
After leaving the legislature, Payen Talu continued his advocacy for indigenous peoples. In December 2007, he participated in a protest at the Executive Yuan, calling for the government to enforce the Aboriginal Basic Law passed in 2005, and acknowledge the United Nations' Declaration on the Rights of Indigenous Peoples. Payen Talu led a group of indigenous demonstrators to the offices of the Kuomintang and Democratic Progressive Party legislative caucuses in June 2011, where they delivered a petition opposing a drafted aboriginal autonomy billI, as the bill did not increase the budget for indigenous affairs or grant them the right to land and natural resources. In August 2013, he called for the Japanese government to renounce its claim over the Senkaku Islands and return them to the control of the Kavalan people. In February 2014, Payen Talu, and fellow former legislators Wei Yao-chien and Chen Wan-chen, among others, founded the Jiawu Regime Change organization in support of Taiwan independence.

== Controversy ==
In September 2010, Payen Talu was accused of molesting two girls. After two appeals, he began serving a five-year prison sentence at Taipei Prison in July 2014. Payen Talu was released in May 2018 to seek medical treatment for kidney failure.
