= Penghu County Government =

Government of Penghu County, Taiwan

Coordinates: 23.5700°N 119.5665°E

- 澎湖縣政府
- Seal of the Penghu County Government (澎湖縣政府印)

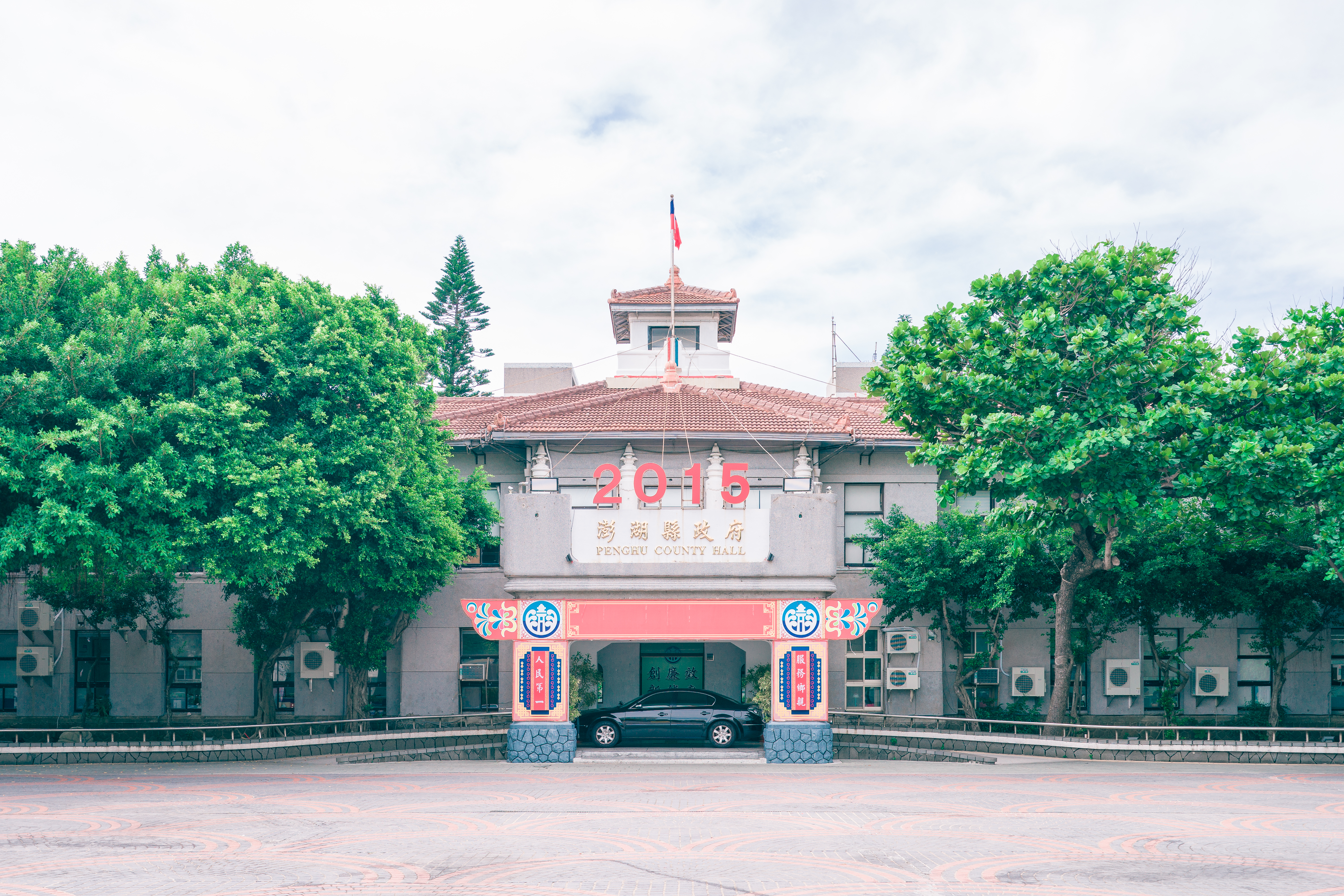
- Penghu County Hall

Agency overview
- Formed: 22 January 1946
- Jurisdiction: Penghu County
- Headquarters: Magong, Penghu, Taiwan
- Agency executive: Chen Kuang-fu, Magistrate
- Website: Official website

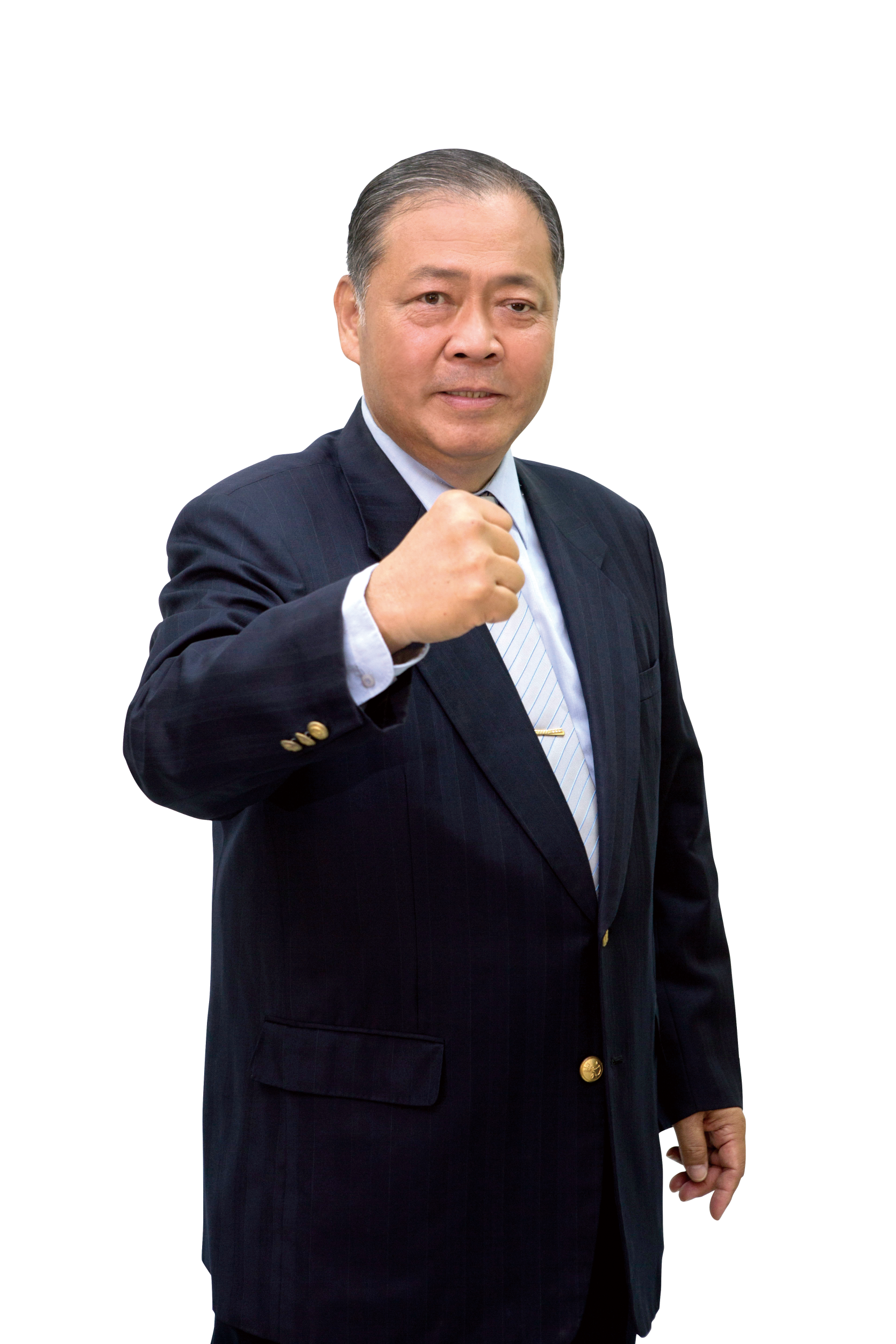
Chen Kuang-fu, the incumbent Magistrate of Penghu County

The Penghu County Government (traditional Chinese: 澎湖縣政府; simplified Chinese: 澎湖县政府; pinyin: Pēnghú Xiàn Xhèngfǔ) is the local government of Penghu County, Taiwan. Penghu County Hall is located in Magong City.

== History ==
Penghu County government was established on 22 January 1946.

== Organizational structure ==
=== City and township offices ===
- Magong City Office
- Husi Township Office
- Baisha Township Office
- Siyu Township Office
- Wang-an Township Office
- Cimei Township Office

=== County government headquarter ===
- Executive Officer
- Senior Secretary
- Secretary
- Consumer Protection Officer

=== Internal unit ===
- Civil Affairs Department
- Finance Department
- Economic Affairs Department
- Education Department
- Public Works Department
- Tourism Department
- Social Affairs Department
- General Affairs Department
- Personnel Department
- Civil service Ethics Department
- Accounting and Statistics Department

=== External agencies ===
==== Organizations ====
- Police Bureau
- Environmental Protection Bureau
- Local Tax Bureau
- Fire Bureau
- Agriculture and Fisheries Bureau
- City Bus and Ferry Management Office
- Public Health Bureau
- Cultural Affairs Bureau

==== Subsidiaries ====
- Land Office
- Animal Disease Control Center
- County Stadium
- Marine Life Propagation Station
- Family Education Center
- Penghu County Forestry and Park Management Center
- Magong City Household Registration Office
- Baisha Township Household Registration Office
- Huxi Township Household Registration Office
- Cimei Township Household Registration Office
- Wangan Township Household Registration Office
- Xiyu Township Household Registration Office

== See also ==
- Penghu County Council
- List of county magistrates of Penghu
