= Lai Feng-wei =

Politician from Taiwan

- 賴峰偉
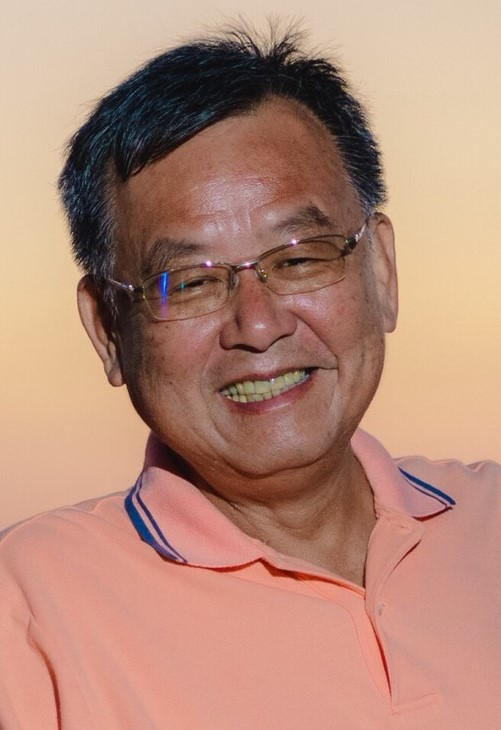

Magistrate of Penghu County
- In office 25 December 2018 – 25 December 2022
- Preceded by: Chen Kuang-fu
- Succeeded by: Chen Kuang-fu
- In office 20 December 1997 – 20 December 2005
- Preceded by: John Lieh Cheng
- Succeeded by: Wang Chien-fa

Minister of Examination
- In office 29 July 2010 – 10 February 2012
- Preceded by: Yang Chao-hsiang
- Succeeded by: Tung Pao-cheng

Personal details
- Born: Penghu, Taiwan; 20 September 1953 (age 72)
- Party: Kuomintang
- Education: Tunghai University (BA); University of Missouri (MS, PhD)

Lai Feng-wei (Chinese: 賴峰偉; pinyin: Lài Fēngwěi; born 20 September 1953) is a Taiwanese politician and engineer. He was the Magistrate of Penghu County since 25 December 2018 after winning the 2018 municipality elections, ending his term after losing to former magistrate Chen Kuang-fu.

== Education ==
After graduating from Tunghai University with a bachelor's degree in chemistry, Lai completed advanced studies in the United States at the University of Missouri, where he earned a master's degree and his Ph.D. in industrial management engineering in 1995. His doctoral dissertation was titled, "Technology alliances of organizations: a resonance theory perspective".

== Political careers ==
=== 2018 Penghu County magistrate election ===
2018 Kuomintang Penghu County magistrate primary results
Candidates	Place	Results
Lai Feng-wei	Called In	Called in after negotiation

2018 Penghu County mayoral results
No.	Candidate	Party	Votes	Percentage
1	On Lee-la (翁珍聖)	Independent	1,379	2.61%
2	Cheng Ching-fa (鄭清發)	Independent	4,330	8.18%
3	Chen Ta-sung (陳大松)	Independent	5,822	11.00%
4	Wu Cheng-lung (吳政隆)	Independent	2,999	5.67%
5	Lai Feng-wei	Kuomintang	20,570	38.87%
6	Chen Kuang-fu	Democratic Progressive Party	17,347	32.78%
7	Lu Hwa-yuann (呂華苑)	Independent	468	0.88%
Total voters			86,603	
Valid votes			52,915	
Invalid votes				
Voter turnout			61.10%	

=== 2019 Mainland China visit ===
On 12 August 2019, Lai, along with Lienchiang County Magistrate Liu Cheng-ying and Kinmen County Magistrate Yang Cheng-wu, visited Beijing and met with Taiwan Affairs Office Director Liu Jieyi requesting Mainland China government to lift up individual travel ban of Mainland Chinese tourists to the three counties due to the constraint cross-strait relations. The mainland government eventually agreed to lift up the ban on 20 September 2019.
