= Chen Hsueh-sheng =

Taiwanese politician

Chen Hsueh-sheng MLY
- 陳雪生
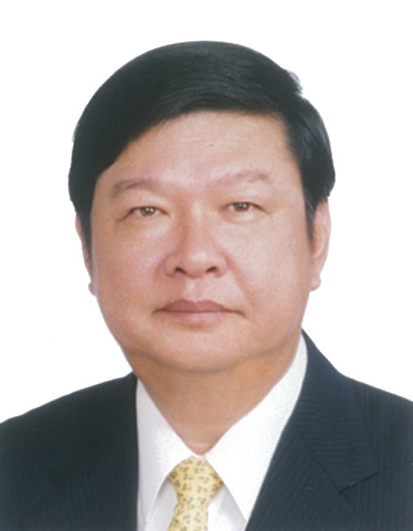

Member of the Legislative Yuan
- Incumbent
- Assumed office 1 February 2012
- Preceded by: Tsao Erh-chung
- Constituency: Lienchiang County

Magistrate of Lienchiang County
- In office 20 December 2001 – 20 December 2009
- Preceded by: Liu Li-chun
- Succeeded by: Yang Sui-sheng

Personal details
- Born: 1 January 1952 (age 74) Juguang, Lienchiang, Fujian, Republic of China
- Party: Kuomintang (2008–2011, 2015–); People First Party (2000–2008)

Chen Hsueh-sheng (Chinese: 陳雪生; pinyin: Chén Xuěshēng; Wade–Giles: Chʻên^{2} Hsüeh^{3}-shêng^{1}; Foochow Romanized: Dìng Siók-sĕng; born 1 January 1952) is a Taiwanese politician. He was the Magistrate of Lienchiang County from 2001 to 2009, and has represented Lienchiang County in the Legislative Yuan since 2012.

== Education ==
Chen studied at National Feng Yuan Commercial High School.

== Political career ==
Chen won the 2001 Lienchiang County magistracy election on 1 December 2001 as a People First Party candidate and took office on 20 December 2001. He was reelected in 2005 and began his second term on 20 December 2005. He contested the 2012 legislative elections as an independent and became a representative of Lienchiang County.

2012 Republic of China legislative election
No.	Candidate	Party	Votes	Percentage
1	Chen Hsueh-sheng	Independent	2,528	49.99%
2	Tsao Erh-chung	Kuomintang	2,361	46.69%
3	Chen Tsai-neng	Independent	168	3.32%
Eligible voters			7,772	
Total votes			5,156	
Valid votes			5,057	
Invalid votes			99	
Voter turnout			66.34%	

He was to rejoin the PFP in 2016 if the Kuomintang lost that year's presidential election, but instead sought Kuomintang membership outright in 2015.

2016 Republic of China legislative election
No.	Candidate	Party	Votes	Percentage
1	Chen Hsueh-sheng	Kuomintang	2,927	68.07%
2	Lin Jin-kuan	Independent	760	17.67%
3	Su Po-hao	Trees Party	506	11.77%
4	Chang Chun-pao	Chinese Unification Promotion Party	107	2.49%
Eligible voters			9,921	
Total votes			4,438	
Valid votes			4,300	
Invalid votes			138	
Voter turnout			44.73%	

== Personal life ==
Chen Hsueh-sheng's younger brother Chen Hsueh-huai is a retired diplomat who led Taiwan's representative office in Macau until 2019.
