= List of county magistrates of Penghu =

Magistrate of the Penghu County
- 澎湖縣縣長
- Seal of Penghu County

- Flag of Penghu County

- Incumbent; Lin Jie-shin since 18 February 2026
- Penghu County Government
- Reports to: Penghu County Council
- Appointer: Direct election
- Term length: Four years, renewable once consecutively, unlimited renewable non-consecutively
- Unofficial names: Magistrate of Penghu
- Deputy: Deputy Magistrate

The magistrate of Penghu is the chief executive of the government of Penghu County. This list includes directly elected magistrates of the county. The incumbent Magistrate is Chen Kuang-fu of the Democratic Progressive Party since 25 December 2022. However, Chen fell in an accident in February 2026. Deputy Magistrate Lin Jie-shin took over since 18 February 2026.

== Directly elected Magistrates ==
Kuomintang Democratic Progressive Party

№	Portrait	Name (Birth–Death)	Term of Office		Term	Political Party
1		Lee Yu-lin 李玉林; Lǐ Yùlín	1 February 1951	2 June 1954	1	Kuomintang
1		Lee Yu-lin 李玉林; Lǐ Yùlín	2 June 1954	2 June 1957	2	Kuomintang
1		Lee Yu-lin 李玉林; Lǐ Yùlín	2 June 1957	2 June 1960	3	Kuomintang
2		Hsu Yung-li 徐詠黎; Xú Yǒnglí	2 June 1960	2 June 1964 (Note: Term extended to 4 years.)	4	Kuomintang
3		Chiang Tzu-wu 蔣祖武; Jiǎng Zǔwǔ	2 June 1964	2 June 1968	5	Kuomintang
3		Chiang Tzu-wu 蔣祖武; Jiǎng Zǔwǔ	2 June 1968	1 February 1973 (Note: Term extended to accommodate joint elections.)	6	Kuomintang
4		Lu An-te 呂安德; Lǚ Āndé	1 February 1973	20 December 1977	7	Kuomintang
5		Hsieh Yu-wen 謝有温; Xiè Yǒuwēn	20 December 1977	20 December 1981	8	Kuomintang
5		Hsieh Yu-wen 謝有温; Xiè Yǒuwēn	20 December 1981	30 May 1985	9	Kuomintang
6		Ou Chien-chuang 歐堅壯; Ōu Jiānzhuàng	20 December 1985	20 December 1989	10	Kuomintang
7		Wang Chien-tung 王乾同; Wáng Qiántóng (?-1992)	20 December 1989	19 October 1992 (Note: Died in office.)	11	Kuomintang
-		Chen Pi-chi (Note: As acting provincial council member.) 陳丕勣; Chén Pījī	5 November 1992	8 March 1993	11	Kuomintang
8		Kao Chih-peng 高植澎; Gāo Zhípéng (1954-)	8 March 1993 (Note: Elected in by-election.)	20 December 1993	11	Democratic Progressive Party
8		Kao Chih-peng 高植澎; Gāo Zhípéng (1954-)	20 December 1993	26 September 1995 (Note: Removed from office due to corruption charges.)	12	Democratic Progressive Party
-		John Lieh Cheng 鄭烈; Zhèng Liè	1 October 1995	20 December 1997	12	Kuomintang
9		Lai Feng-wei 賴峰偉; Lài Fēngwěi (1953-)	20 December 1997	20 December 2001	13	Kuomintang
9		Lai Feng-wei 賴峰偉; Lài Fēngwěi (1953-)	20 December 2001	20 December 2005	14	Kuomintang
10		Wang Chien-fa (Note: Younger brother of Wang Chien-tung.) 王乾發; Wáng Qiánfā (1949-)	20 December 2005	20 December 2009	15	Kuomintang
10		Wang Chien-fa 王乾發; Wáng Qiánfā (1949-)	20 December 2009	25 December 2014 (Note: Term extended for joint elections with special municipalities.)	16	Kuomintang
11		Chen Kuang-fu 陳光復; Chén Guāngfù (1955-)	25 December 2014	25 December 2018 (Note: Lost reelection.)	17	Democratic Progressive Party
(9)		Lai Feng-wei 賴峰偉; Lài Fēngwěi (1953-)	25 December 2018	25 December 2022	18	Kuomintang
(11)		Chen Kuang-fu 陳光復; Chén Guāngfù (1955-)	25 December 2022	18 February 2026 de facto (Note: Hospitalized after a fall. Subsequently, deemed incapable to fulfill his powers and duties as magistrate.)	19	Democratic Progressive Party
—		Lin Jid-shin 林皆興; Lín Jiēxìng	18 February 2026	Incumbent	—	Independent

== See also ==
- Penghu County Government
