= Stella Chen (politician) =

Taiwanese politician (1950–2025)

- 陳婉真
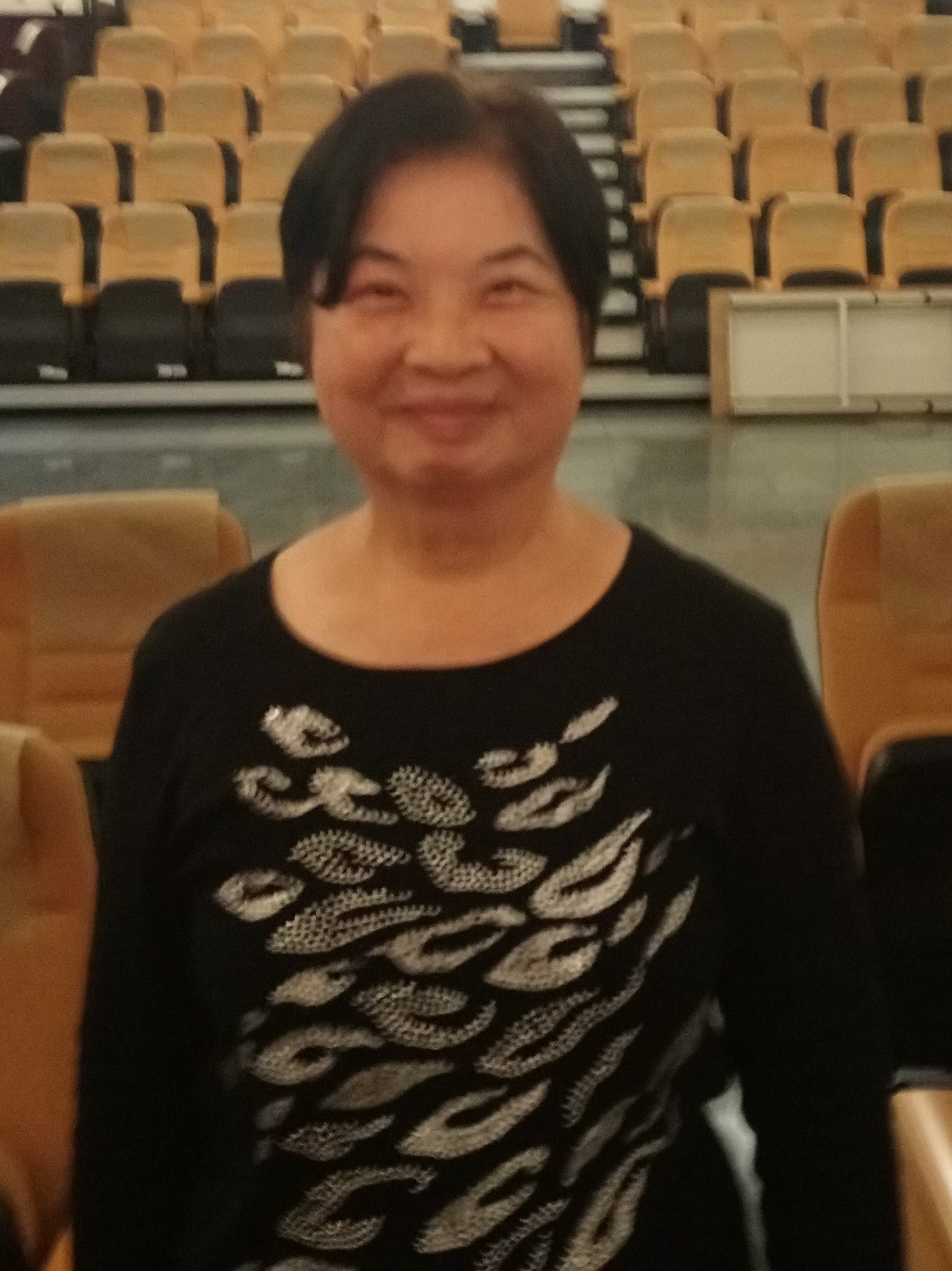
- Chen in 2018

Member of the Legislative Yuan
- In office 1 February 1993 – 31 January 1995
- Constituency: Taipei County

Personal details
- Born: 10 June 1950 Changhua City, Taiwan
- Died: 11 June 2025 (aged 75) Chiang Mai, Thailand
- Party: Kuomintang; DPP (1989–1997); New Nation Alliance (1998–?)
- Education: National Taiwan Normal University (BA)
- Occupation: Journalist and politician

Chinese name
- Traditional Chinese: 陳婉真
Transcriptions
Standard Mandarin
- Hanyu Pinyin: Chén Wǎnzhēn
- Wade–Giles: Ch'en2 Wan3-chen1

Stella Chen Wan-chen (Chinese: 陳婉真; 10 June 1950 – 11 June 2025) was a Taiwanese journalist and politician.

== Early life and activism ==
Chen was born on 10 June 1950, and raised in Changhua City, Changhua County. After graduating from Changhua Girls' Senior High School, Chen studied social education as an undergraduate at National Taiwan Normal University. She then worked for the China Times, where she was assigned to cover the Taiwan Provincial Council. In time, she became interested in, then supported, the tangwai movement. Chen declared her candidacy for the December 1978 legislative elections, which were postponed after the United States announced the termination of official diplomatic relations between it and the Republic of China, which took effect the following month. Chen spent the next ten years in the United States.

Chen's open support of the tangwai movement included the cofounding of opposition publication, Chao Liu (潮流) while overseas, and led to her being blacklisted from Taiwan. She protested Chao Liu's forced closure in 1979 by going on a hunger strike at Taiwan's representative office in New York, and later edited the Los Angeles-based Formosa Weekly. Chen attempted a return to Taiwan in July 1988, was turned back at Chiang Kai-shek International Airport, and went back to Los Angeles. Chen successfully and secretly returned to Taiwan for Cheng Nan-jung's funeral in 1989, and planned to restore her household registration to run for the Taipei City Council with the support of the Democratic Progressive Party. She refused to disclose how she arrived in Taiwan and was barred from establishing residency. Chen protested the decision by declaring a hunger strike.

The Kuomintang-led government continued to question Chen's contemporaries regarding her whereabouts until the early 1990s. Chen was arrested on 4 November 1990, for violations of the Marching and Demonstrations Law. She was detained at Chiang Kai-shek International Airport while preparing to depart for the United States, and again refused to answer questions posed by the Taipei District Court. She was sentenced to six months imprisonment. On 16 May 1991, Chen founded the Organization for Taiwan Nation-Building. The next month, the Kuomintang-led government charged her with sedition under Article 100 of the Criminal Code. Chen went on the run and was not captured until February 1992. Later that year, Chen faced additional legal action, when she and her supporters encountered police while on their way to the Taichung District Court. She was found not guilty of disturbing the peace in March 1993.

Chen was close to the American activist Lynn Miles, who himself was blacklisted from Taiwan between 1971 and 1996.

== Formal political career ==
As a member of the Democratic Progressive Party, Chen served in the Legislative Yuan from 1993 to 1995. In 1993, she led a petition for the Council of Grand Justices to rule on the "existing national boundaries" clause of the Constitution of the Republic of China, and its effect on the recognition of Mongolia. She ran in the 1996 Taiwanese National Assembly election for a seat in Taipei County. During her campaign, Chen damaged a statue of Chiang Kai-shek. The Democratic Progressive Party were not able to defend Chen's Legislative Yuan seat. She resigned as secretary general of the DPP's caucus within the National Assembly on 30 July 1996.

Chen was expelled from the Democratic Progressive Party in 1997 for slandering party members and had mounted an unsuccessful reelection bid for the Legislative Yuan under the New Nation Alliance banner in 1998. Since at least 1999, Chen had been serving as director of the Nantou County Government's Social Affairs Bureau, under magistrate Peng Pai-hsien. Chen had not paid the associated fines for the statue she damaged in 1995, and was arrested in 2001, as she remained in her local government position under Peng. Earlier that year, Chen had started a hunger strike when Peng was detained on corruption charges. She said of the case against Peng, "[T]he prosecution is misleading the public by indicating the foundations as if the money had come straight out of Peng's own pockets." Starting in 2006, Chen worked for the Changhua County Government's Department of Information, then General Affairs, under magistrate Cho Po-yuan.

== Later research and writings ==
Chen later began researching how regime change had affected Taiwan, particularly focusing on 1940 to 1950, which she called the "decade of chaos". In 2013, Chen published a collection of interviews with Taiwanese who had been raised during the Japanese era, including former members of the Imperial Japanese Army. She also commented on the September 2013 power struggle. Alongside fellow former legislators Payen Talu, Wei Yao-chien, and others, Chen cofounded the Jiawu Regime Change organization in further support of Taiwanese independence in 2014, and in 2016 established the Taiwan Transitional Justice Association. From July 2017, Chen led Taiwan People News.

== Personal life, illness and death ==
Chen's husband Chang Wei-chia studied abroad in Switzerland and France was also active in the Democratic Progressive Party. Their son pursued doctoral coursework at the University of California, Berkeley and also attended the University of Oxford from 2005 to 2007. He is currently an assistant professor at Florida State University.

Chen was diagnosed with breast cancer in 2015, but chose not to disclose the condition at the time. In 2021, her condition worsened and was identified as triple-negative breast cancer. She died while seeking treatment in Chiang Mai, Thailand on 11 June 2025, one day after her 75th birthday.
