= Chienshan Power Plant =

Power plant in Huxi, Penghu, Taiwan

Chienshan Power Plant 尖山發電廠
- Country: Republic of China
- Location: Huxi, Penghu, Taiwan
- Coordinates: 23°33′47″N 119°39′40″E
- Status: Operational
- Commission date: November 2000 (Unit 2-3); December 2000 (Unit 1); February 2001 (Unit 4); May 2002 (Unit 5); June 2002 (Unit 6); August 2002 (Unit 7-8); November 2002 (Unit 9-10); January 2003 (Unit 11-12)
- Owner: Taipower
- Operator: Taipower

Thermal power station
- Primary fuel: Diesel fuel

Power generation
- Units operational: 4 × 10.443 MW (diesel); 8 × 11 MW (diesel); 8 × 0.6 MW (wind); 6 × 0.9 MW (wind)
- Nameplate capacity: 140 MW

The Chienshan Power Plant (traditional Chinese: 尖山發電廠; simplified Chinese: 尖山发电厂; pinyin: Jiānshān Fādiànchǎng) is a fuel-fired power plant in Huxi Township, Penghu County, Taiwan. With the total capacity of 140 MW, the power plant is the largest diesel fuel-fired power plant in Taiwan. Chienshan Power Plant is the only major power plant in Penghu Island. Its 3 smokestacks have a height of 75 metres and were built in 2002 .

== History ==
In November 1994, the Executive Yuan approved the construction of the power plant. In June 1990, the first phase of the power plant was commissioned with four generation units with a total installed capacity of 10.4 MW. In March 1998, the Executive Yuan approved for the expansion of the power plant on Unit 5–12 with the total installed capacity of 11 MW. The construction of those eight generation units were completed in December 2002.

== Technical specifications ==
=== Power transmission ===
The power plant consists of Penghu Substation in which acts as the connecting point for the Taiwan-Penghu 161 kV Cable Line connecting Penghu to Taiwan Island. The line spans for a total length of 67.9 km, in which 58.8 km is submarine power cable and 9.1 km is land cable.

== See also ==
- List of power stations in Taiwan
- Electricity sector in Taiwan
