= Wang Chien-fa =

Politician from Taiwan

- 王乾發
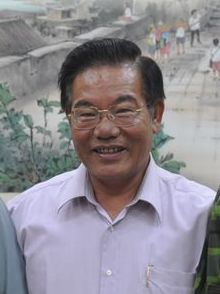

Magistrate of Penghu County
- In office 20 December 2005 – 25 December 2014
- Preceded by: Lai Feng-wei
- Succeeded by: Chen Kuang-fu

Personal details
- Born: 19 March 1949 (age 77) Penghu County, Taiwan
- Party: Kuomintang
- Education: National Open University (BA)

Wang Chien-fa (Chinese: 王乾發; pinyin: Wáng Qiánfā; born 19 March 1949) is a politician in Taiwan. He was the Magistrate of Penghu County from 20 December 2005 until 25 December 2014.

== Education ==
Wang obtained his bachelor's degree in public administration from National Open University.

== Penghu County Magistrate ==
=== 2005 Penghu County Magistracy election ===
Wang was elected Magistrate of Penghu County as the Kuomintang candidate on 3 December 2005 and assumed office on 20 December 2005.

2005 Penghu County Magistrate Election Result
No.	Candidate	Party	Votes	Percentage
1	Chen Kuang-fu	DPP	23,964	48.16%
2	Wang Chien-fa	KMT	25,223	50.69%

=== 2009 Penghu County Magistracy election ===
Wang was reelected for a second term on 5 December 2009.

2009 Penghu County Magistrate Election Result
No.	Candidate	Party	Votes	Percentage
1	Tsai Chien-hsing (蔡見興)	DPP	22,069	48.07%
2	Wang Chien-fa	KMT	22,664	49.37%

== See also ==
- Penghu County Government
