= Wang Chung-ming =

Taiwanese politician

- 王忠銘
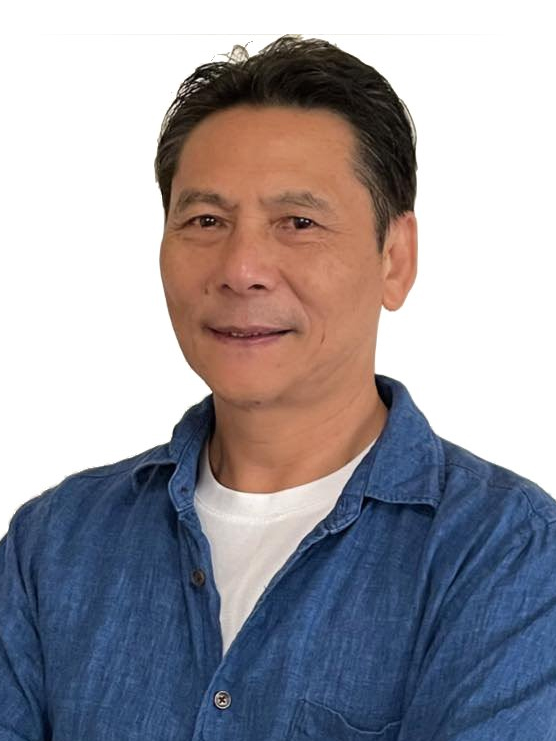
- Official portrait, 2022

45th Magistrate of Lienchiang
- Incumbent
- Assumed office 25 December 2022
- Deputy: Chen Kuan-jen
- Preceded by: Liu Cheng-ying

Deputy Magistrate of Lienchiang
- In office 6 January 2017 – 1 September 2022
- Magistrate: Liu Cheng-ying
- Preceded by: Chen Chin-chung
- Succeeded by: Chen Kuan-jen

Personal details
- Born: 27 February 1958 (age 68) Lienchiang, Fuchien, Republic of China
- Party: Kuomintang

Wang Chung-ming (Chinese: 王忠銘; pinyin: Wáng Zhōngmíng; born 27 February 1958) is a Taiwanese politician who is the current magistrate of Lienchiang County since 25 December 2022.

Wang was the deputy magistrate of Lienchang County until his September 2022 resignation. He was elected to succeed Liu Cheng-ying as county magistrate, defeating fellow Kuomintang member Tsao Erh-yuan and Democratic Progressive Party candidate Lii Wen. Before assuming office on 25 December 2022, Wang traveled to China to discuss the three links, which were later partly restored by the Taiwanese government.
