= Longmen Jianshan Pier =

Pier in Huxi, Penghu, Taiwan

Longmen Jianshan Pier 龍門尖山港
- Type: pier
- Location: Huxi, Penghu, Taiwan
- Coordinates: 23°33′32″N 119°40′18″E
- Owner: Taiwan International Ports Corporation

Characteristics
- Width: 120 m (390 ft)
- Clearance below: 8 m

The Longmen Jianshan Pier (traditional Chinese: 龍門尖山港; simplified Chinese: 龙门尖山港; pinyin: Lóngmén Jiānshān Gǎng) is a pier in Huxi Township, Penghu County, Taiwan.

== Architecture ==
The pier spans over an area of 147.7 hectares, which consists of 131.8 hectares of water area and 15.9 hectares of land area. It has a width of 120 meters and water channel depth of 8 meters. It has eight berths.

== Activities ==
The pier handles the logistics of general freight, raw materials and construction materials. The pier has a maximum annual cargo loading capacity of 1 million freight tons.

== See also ==
- Transportation in Taiwan
