= Jianshan Temple =

Buddhist temple in Guilin, China

- 鉴山寺
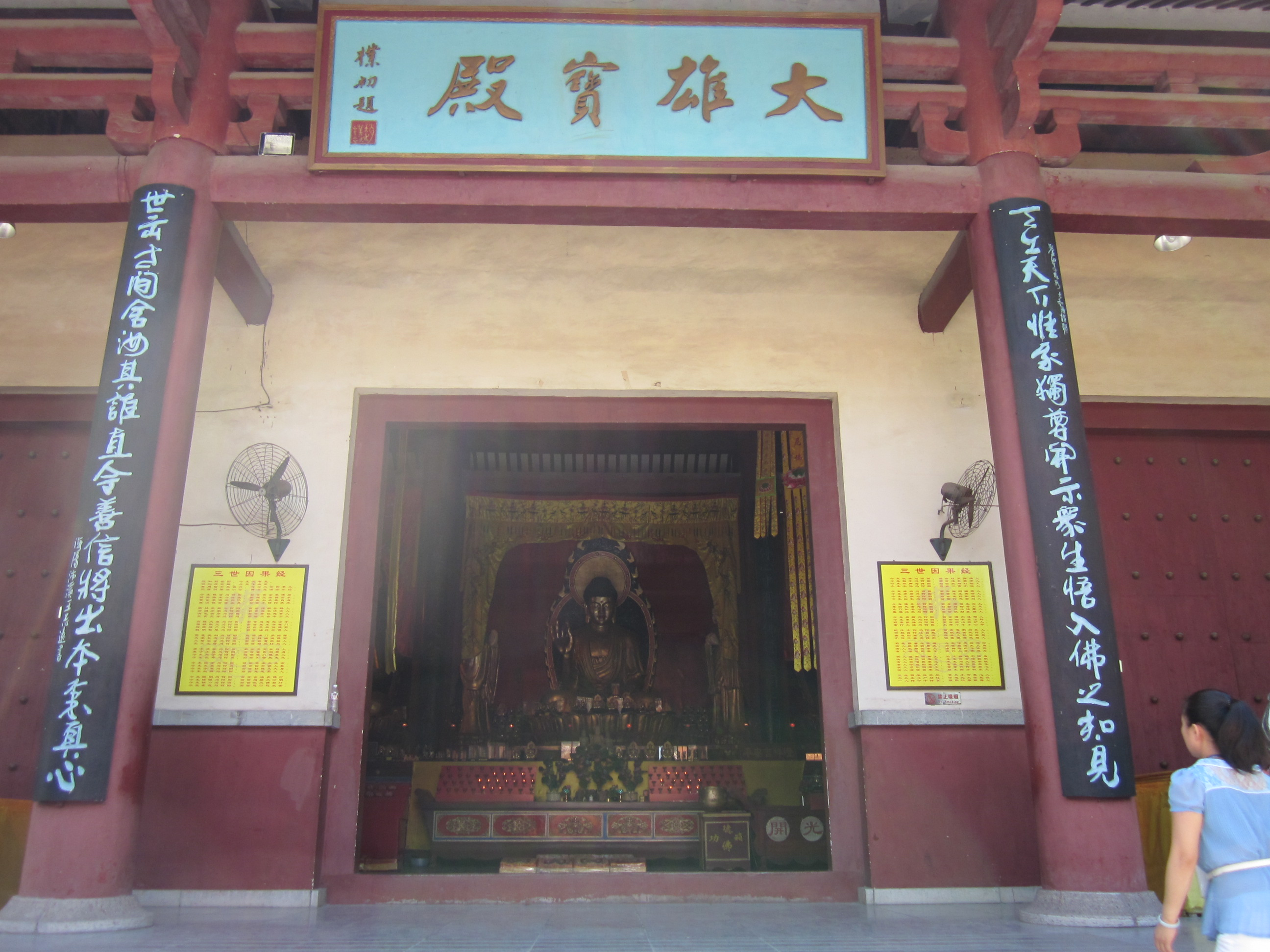
- Mahavira Hall

- Location within Guangxi Location within China

Religion
- Affiliation: Buddhism
- Sect: Chan Buddhism
- District: Yangshuo County
- Prefecture: Guilin
- Province: Guangxi

Location
- Country: China
- Prefecture: Guilin
- Coordinates: 24°43′51″N 110°29′17″E

Architecture
- Style: Chinese architecture
- Completed: 713

Jianshan Temple (simplified Chinese: 鉴山寺; traditional Chinese: 鑑山寺; pinyin: Jiànshān Sì) is a Buddhist temple located in Yangshuo County, Guilin, Guangxi Zhuang Autonomous Region, in the People's Republic of China. It includes the shanmen, Mahavira Hall, Meditation Room, Dining Room, etc. The temple has a building area of about 5,589 square metres (60,160 sq ft) and covers an area of 14,333.3 metres (47,025 ft).

== History ==
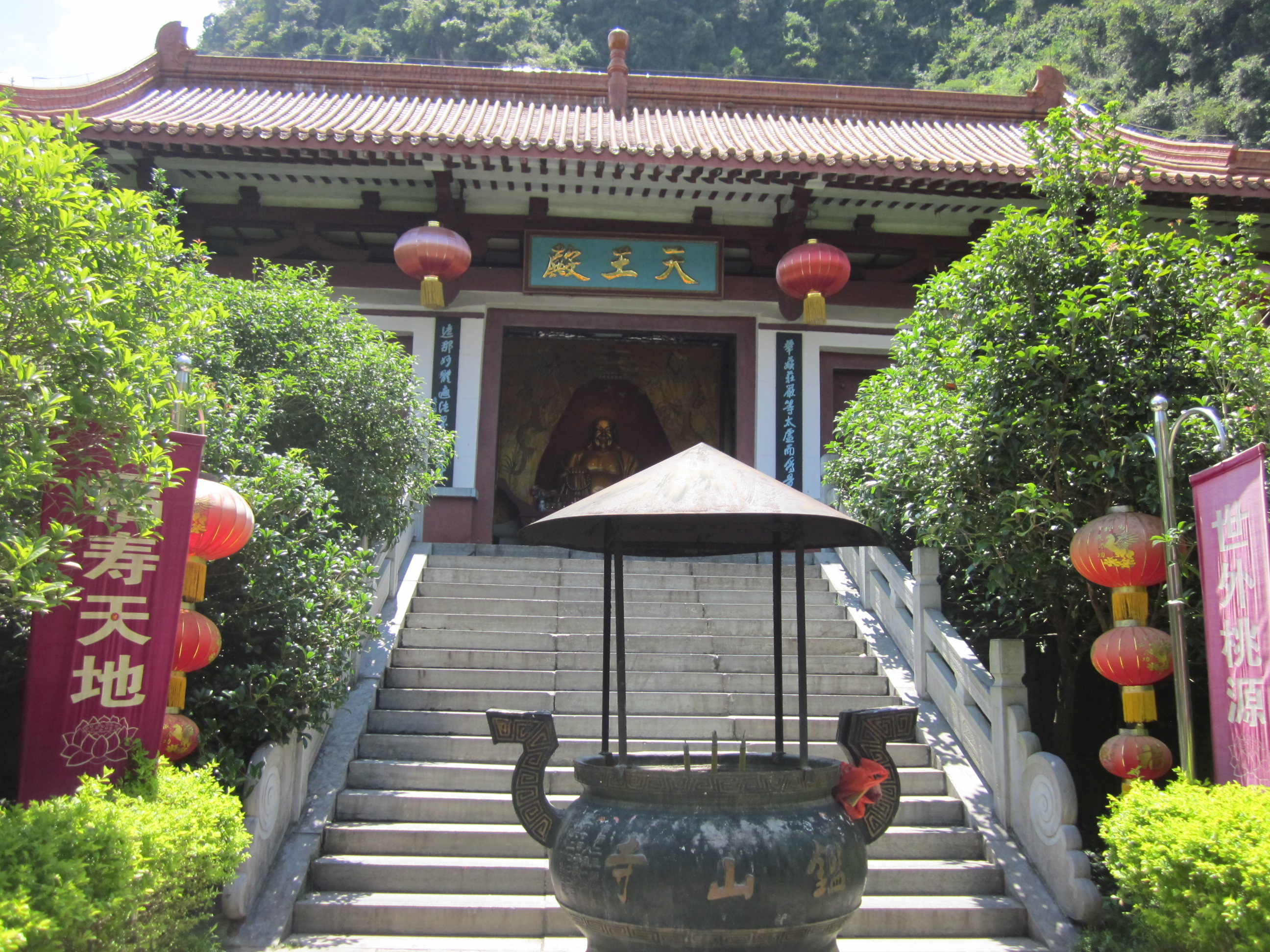
Hall of the Celestial Kings.

In 713, in the first year of the age of Kaiyuan (713–742) of Emperor Xuanzong, the temple was built. In summer 748, Jianzhen made his fifth attempt to reach Japan, but he failed, he lived in Jianshan Temple.

In 1995, the government planned to rebuild the temple. On January 1, 2001, the temple was rebuilt and opened to the public.
