= Tsao Erh-chung =

Taiwanese politician

- 曹爾忠
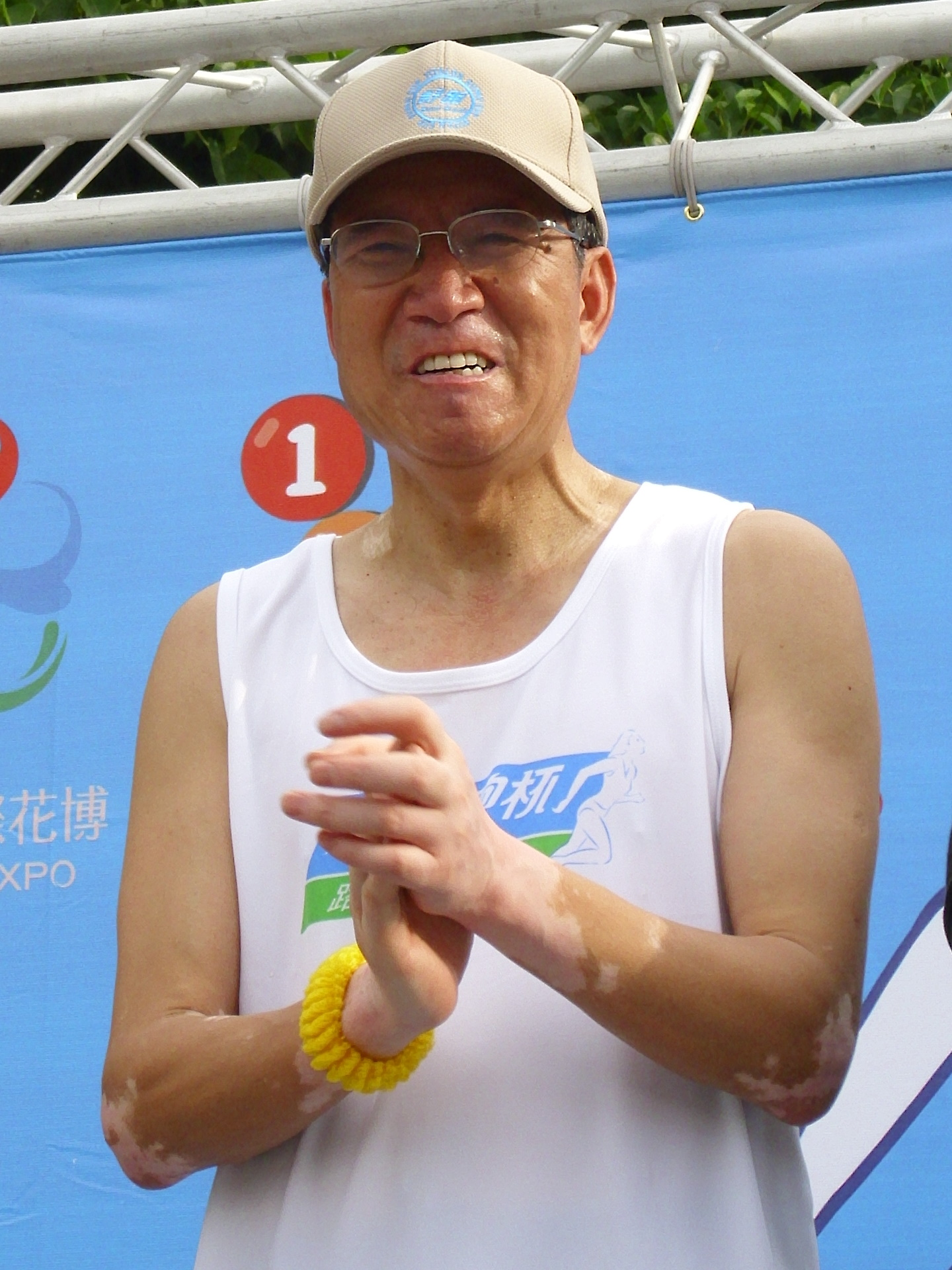
- Tsao at the Supau Cup Mini Marathon in Taipei, 2010

Member of the Legislative Yuan
- In office 1 February 2005 – 31 January 2012
- Succeeded by: Chen Hsueh-sheng
- Constituency: Lienchiang County
- In office 1 February 1993 – 31 January 2002
- Constituency: Lienchiang County

Personal details
- Born: 24 August 1954 (age 71) Lienchiang County, Republic of China (Taiwan)
- Party: Kuomintang
- Education: Central Police University (BA)

Tsao Erh-chung (Chinese: 曹爾忠; pinyin: Cáo Ěrzhōng; born 24 August 1954) is a Taiwanese politician. He was a member of the Legislative Yuan between 1993 and 2002, then served from 2005 to 2012.

== Academic and early career ==
Tsao attended Matsu High School, and graduated from Central Police University. He then worked for the Lienchiang County Police Department and was a lecturer at Taiwan Police College.

== Political career ==
Tsao helped reach what became the Kinmen Agreement, signed in 1990. He first won election to the Legislative Yuan in 1992, and represented the Lienchiang County Constituency until 2002. In 1999, during his third term, Tsao helped negotiate the return of the Taiwanese vessel Shin Hwa from China. He was a proponent of the three links, and believed that their establishment would aid economic development in the outlying islands of Taiwan. In 2001, Tsao visited Fujian as part of a pilgrimage for the goddess Mazu. He returned to China later that month to sign an unofficial agreement with government officials of Mawei District. The Mainland Affairs Council called the move a "person-to-person exchange" that "had no legal bearing," and warned neighboring Kinmen against a similar action. Subsequently, the MAC announced its Eight Noes" policy regarding exchanges with China. After Lee Yuan-tsu was prevented from attending APEC China 2001 as a representative of Taiwan's government, Tsao stated of the Kuomintang legislative caucus, "We agree with the government's decision not to participate in the APEC summit and condemn China's rough treatment of Taiwan's delegation that is already in Shanghai." Tsao lost reelection in December 2001. Before stepping down, he helped pass amendments to the Offshore Islands Development Act, permitting more Taiwanese to visit China via the outlying islands.

Tsao contested the 2004 legislative elections as an independent, and won. He was seated as a representative from Lienchiang County. A month after taking office, Tsao joined Kuomintang officials on a trip to China. He remained a staunch supporter of the three links, additionally backing landing visa privileges for Chinese visitors to Taiwan. Previously, in August 2005, he had spoken out against a planned reduction in military personnel stationed in the Matsu Islands. He proposed a full ban on land mines that December. Tsao defeated Lin Hui-kuan in the 2008 legislative elections. During this session, the Citizen Congress Watch ranked Tsao as one of the worst legislators. He began taking an interest in transportation, infrastructure, and civil order. Specifically, Tsao supported official designation of demonstration zones, and opposed the lax employment protections at free ports, as well as a proposal for Taoyuan International Airport to be exempt from most government oversight. Tsao later stated that Taiwanese nationals should be given preferential consideration for management positions at the airport because it is a state-owned enterprise. He was elected chair of the legislature's Transportation Committee alongside Lin Chien-jung in March 2009. Two months later, while discussing an amendment to the Act for Promotion of Private Participation in Infrastructure Projects that would permit Chinese investment in Taiwanese infrastructure projects, Tsao opined that the proposed change was legal. Upon hearing the statement, Democratic Progressive Party lawmakers prevented Tsao from taking his seat. He then adjourned the meeting and scheduled a second discussion which the DPP boycotted.

Tsao worked to market his constituency to tourists. He urged the government to place Chinese tourists under a free independent tourist policy, and defended them publicly on occasion. Tsao also pushed for more funding through the Offshore Islands Development Fund. In March 2011, Tsao proposed an amendment to the Act for the Development of Tourism that would allow chain convenience stores to sell tickets for maritime and air transportation. The motion passed and was implemented that same month.

Tsao yielded his legislative seat to Chen Hsueh-sheng in 2012. After leaving the legislature, Tsao led the Chinese Taipei Road Running Association. In October 2017, Tsao became the first directly elected leader of the Kuomintang's Lienchiang County chapter. He left the Kuomintang to run in the 2020 legislative election as an independent and unendorsed candidate.
