= List of county magistrates of Lienchiang =

The magistrate of Lienchiang is the chief executive of the government of Lienchiang County, Fujian Province, Republic of China. This list includes directly elected magistrates of the county. The incumbent Magistrate is Wang Chung-ming of the Kuomintang since 25 December 2022.

== Directly elected County Magistrates ==
Kuomintang People First Party

№	Portrait	Name (Birth–Death)	Term of Office		Term	Political Party
1		Tsao Chang-shun 曹常順; Cáo Chángshùn (1943–2015)	20 December 1993	20 December 1997	1	Kuomintang
2		Liu Li-chun 劉立群; Liú Lìqún (1952–2004)	20 December 1997	20 December 2001	2	Kuomintang
3		Chen Hsueh-sheng 陳雪生; Chén Xuěshēng (1952–)	20 December 2001	20 December 2005	3	People First Party
3		Chen Hsueh-sheng 陳雪生; Chén Xuěshēng (1952–)	20 December 2005	20 December 2009	4	People First Party
		Chen Hsueh-sheng 陳雪生; Chén Xuěshēng (1952–)	20 December 2005	20 December 2009	4	Kuomintang
4		Yang Sui-sheng 楊綏生; Yáng Suīshēng (1954-)	20 December 2009	25 December 2014	5	Kuomintang
5		Liu Cheng-ying 劉增應; Liú Zēngyīng (1958-)	25 December 2014	25 December 2018	6	Kuomintang
5		Liu Cheng-ying 劉增應; Liú Zēngyīng (1958-)	25 December 2018	25 December 2022	7	Kuomintang
6		Wang Chung-ming 王忠銘; Wáng Zhōngmíng (1958-)	25 December 2022	Incumbent	8	Kuomintang

== See also ==
- List of heads of local governments in the Republic of China
