= Huxi, Penghu =

Coordinates: 23°35′N 119°40′E

Huxi Township 湖西鄉 Husi, Hu-hsi, Oôsai
- Rural township
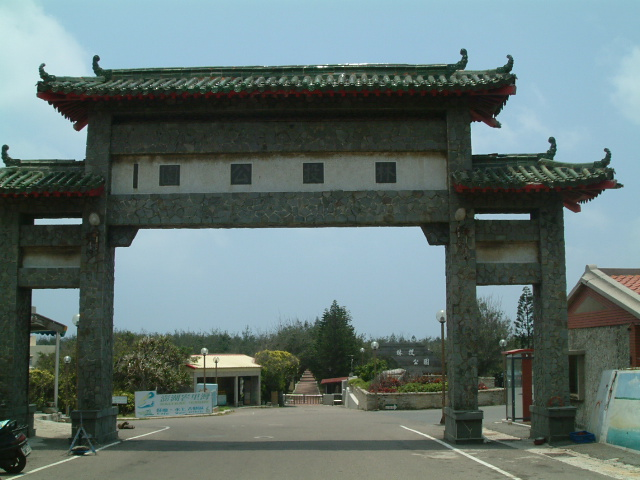

- Huxi Township in Penghu County
- Country: Republic of China
- Province: Taiwan
- County: Penghu
- Rural villages: 22

Government
  - Mayor: Cheng-Chieh Wu (吳政杰)

Area
  - Total: 33 km^{2} (13 sq mi)

Population (March 2023)
  - Total: 15,876
  - Density: 480/km^{2} (1,200/sq mi)
- Website: www.huxi.gov.tw/en (in Chinese)

Huxi Township
- Traditional Chinese: 湖西鄉
Transcriptions
Standard Mandarin
- Hanyu Pinyin: Húxī Xiāng
- Bopomofo: ㄏㄨˊ ㄒㄧ ㄒㄧㄤ
- Wade–Giles: Hu^{2}-hsi^{1} Hsiang^{1}
- Tongyong Pinyin: Hú-xi Xiang
- IPA: [xǔ.ɕí ɕiáŋ]
Hakka
- Pha̍k-fa-sṳ: Fù-sî-hiông
Southern Min
- Hokkien POJ: Ô͘-sai-hiong
- Tâi-lô: Oô-sai-hiong

Huxi Township is a rural township in Penghu County, Taiwan. It is located on the eastern part of the Penghu Main Island and is the largest township in Penghu County.

== History ==
Huxi Township was administered as Kosei Village (湖西庄) during the Japanese era. From 1920 to 1926, the village was under Hōko District, Takao Prefecture. In 1926, the Pescadores was transferred to Hōko Prefecture; the village transferred to Makō Subprefecture (馬公支廳).

== Geography ==
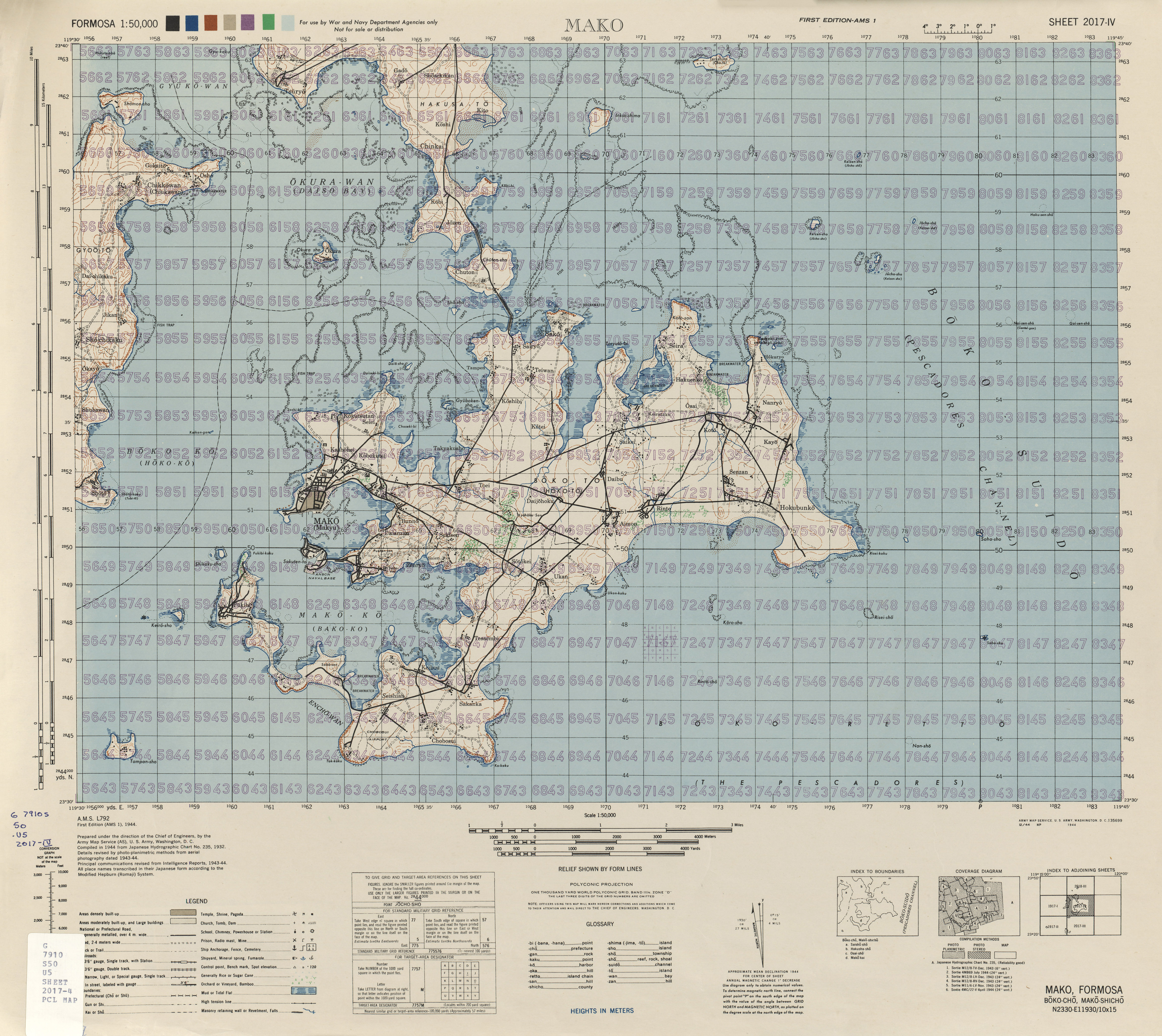
Map including Huxi (labeled as Ōsai) (1944)

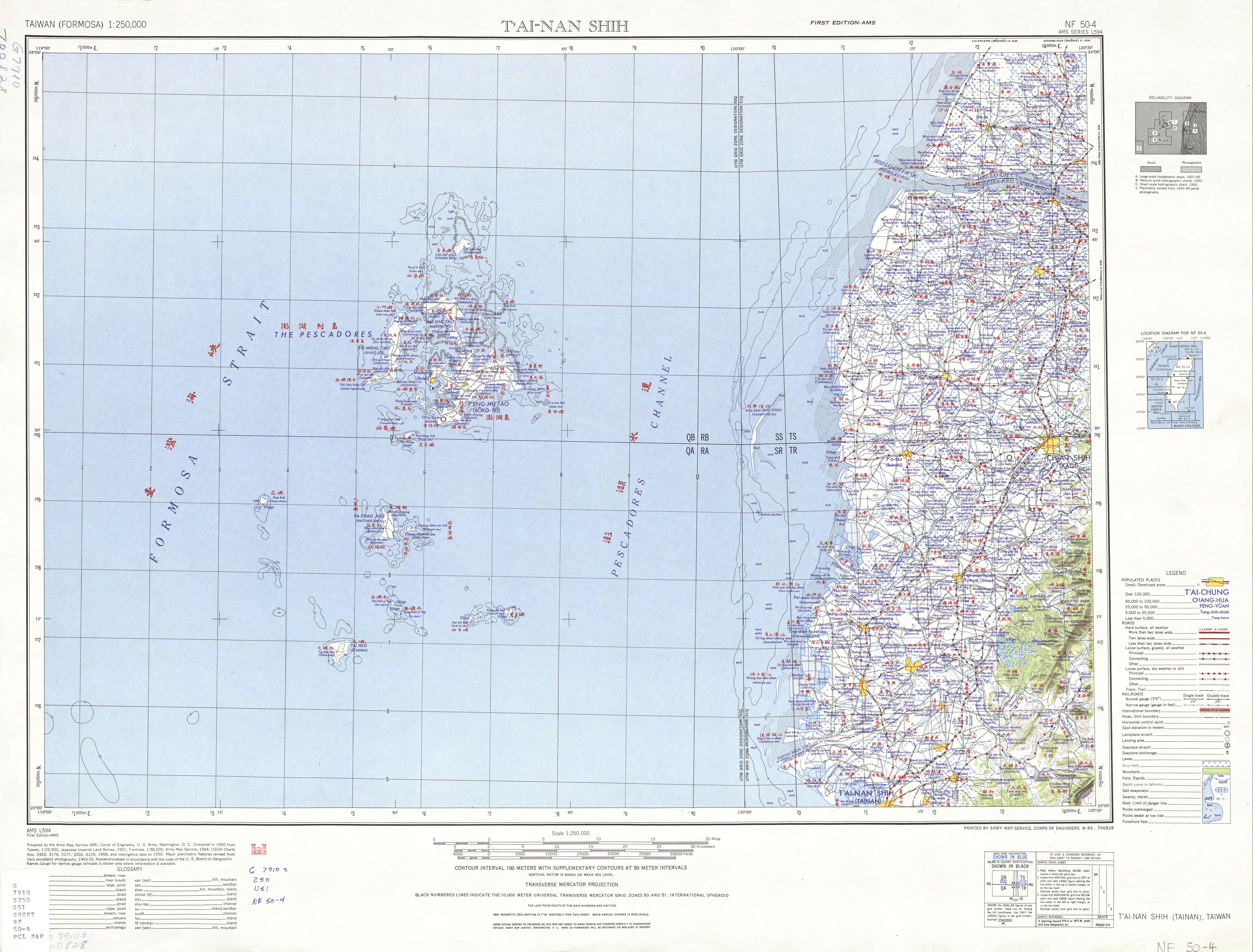
Map including Huxi (labeled as Hu-hsi (Ōsai) 湖西) (1950)

Huxi Township includes ten minor islands. There are many villages in the township. Among them, Guoye village is famous for its sunrise since it is at the most eastern corner of Penghu main island. Beiliao village is considered as a beautiful place because of multiple sea views and a hill.

== Politics and government ==
=== Administrative divisions ===
Huxi Township is divided into 22 rural villages:

- Aimen (隘門村)
- Baikeng (白坑村)
- Beiliao (北寮村)
- Chengbei (城北村)
- Chenggong (成功村)
- Dingwan (鼎灣村)
- Dongshi/Dongshih (東石村)
- Guoye (果葉村)
- Hongluo (紅羅村)
- Hudong (湖東村)
- Huxi (湖西村)
- Jianshan (尖山村)
- Lintou (林投村)
- Longmen (龍門村)
- Nanliao (南寮村)
- Qingluo (青螺村)
- Shagang (沙港村)
- Xixi (西溪村)
- Taiwu (太武村)
- Tanbian (潭邊村)
- Xujia (許家村)
- Zhongxi (中西村)

=== Mayors ===
- Appointed mayors
1. Kao Chen-Kun (高振坤)
- Elected mayors
1. Kao Chen-Kun (高振坤)
2. Chen Chien (陳鑑)
3. Wu Tan-Shih (吳胆石)
4. Hsu Shih-Liu (許石柳)
5. Chen Tung-Chen (陳東震)
6. Li Chun-Chi (李春氣)
7. Wu Ming-Hao (吳明浩)
8. Hung Fu-Chih (洪福至)
9. Chen Chen-Chung (陳振中)
10. Cheng-Chieh Wu (吳政杰)

== Infrastructure ==
- Chenggong Reservoir
- Chienshan Power Plant

== Tourist attractions ==
- Qingluo Wetland
- Water Activities at Aimen Beach

== Transportation ==
- Longmen Jianshan Pier

== Notable natives ==
- Chen Kuang-fu, Magistrate of Penghu County (2014–2018)
- Chen Kuei-miao, Acting Mayor of Tainan (1985)
