= Wei Yao-chien =

Taiwanese politician

Wei Yao-chien MLY
- 魏耀乾

Member of the Legislative Yuan
- In office 1 February 1990 – 31 January 1996
- Constituency: Tainan

Personal details
- Born: 5 February 1950 (age 76) Jiali, Tainan County, Taiwan
- Party: Independent
- Other political affiliations: Home Party; Democratic Progressive Party
- Education: Sun Yat-Sen Medical College (BS); National Taiwan University (MA); University of Essex (MA); Yale University (MPP); Harvard University
- Profession: dentist

Wei Yao-chien (Chinese: 魏耀乾; pinyin: Wèi Yàoqián; Wade–Giles: Wei^{4} Yao^{4}-chʻien^{2}; born 5 February 1950) is a Taiwanese politician, lawyer, and dentist.

== Early life and education ==
Wei was born on 5 February 1950 in Tainan to a conservative family with strong ties to the Kuomintang. After attending high school in Kaohsiung, he graduated from the Department of Dentistry of Sun Yat-Sen Medical College (now Sun Yat-sen University) in Guangzhou, China, and earned a master's degree in political science from National Taiwan University.

Wei then went to England to be educated at the University of Essex, where he earned a master's degree in government, and then earned another master's degree from Yale University in the United States. He also studied government at Harvard University, was a visiting researcher in environmental psychology at San Diego State University, and was a special researcher at the School of International Dispute Settlement (ISODARCO) at the Sapienza University of Rome in Italy.

== Political career ==
Wei turned against the Kuomintang after Fang Su-min and Lin Yi-hsiung's twin daughters were stabbed to death in 1979. His friendship with Frank Hsieh also contributed to Wei's political beliefs. Wei represented Tainan for two terms on the Legislative Yuan, from 1990 to 1996, as a member of the Democratic Progressive Party. During his legislative tenure, Wei became known for fighting fellow lawmakers. Wei alluded to his dental practice in describing physical confrontation attempts to "pull the tiger's teeth." Wei left the Democratic Progressive Party to run an independent campaign for the Tainan County magistracy in 2001. Though a July 2001 opinion poll showed that Wei had not garnered much support, a potential split in the Pan-Green Coalition's voter base between Wei and Su Huan-chih was still considered damaging to Su. Wei's campaign was run by former Tainan deputy magistrate Lin Wen-ding. Wei was placed on the Home Party list during the 2008 legislative elections, but not elected to the Legislative Yuan. He contested the Lienchiang County magistracy as an independent in 2018. In October 2023, Wei began campaigning for the January 2024 legislative election.

== Activism ==
In 2006, Wei served as executive director of the Million Voices Against Corruption, President Chen Must Go campaign led by Shih Ming-teh. In this position, Wei acted as a spokesman and represented the campaign to the Legislative Yuan. In February 2014, Wei founded the Jiawu Regime Change organization alongside fellow former legislators Chen Wan-chen and Payen Talu, among others, to advocate Taiwan independence. Wei was in attendance at Tsai Ing-wen's presidential inauguration on 20 May 2016, alongside a group of protestors advocating for the replacement of the Constitution of the Republic of China with a Taiwan-centric supreme law. In 2018, Wei and another former legislator, Liang Mu-yang, led a demonstration on the 71st anniversary of the 228 incident, again in support of a rewritten constitution for Taiwan.

== Personal life ==
Wei has a one child, a son who has three master's degrees and a doctorate in law.
