= Chen Kuang-fu =

Taiwanese politician

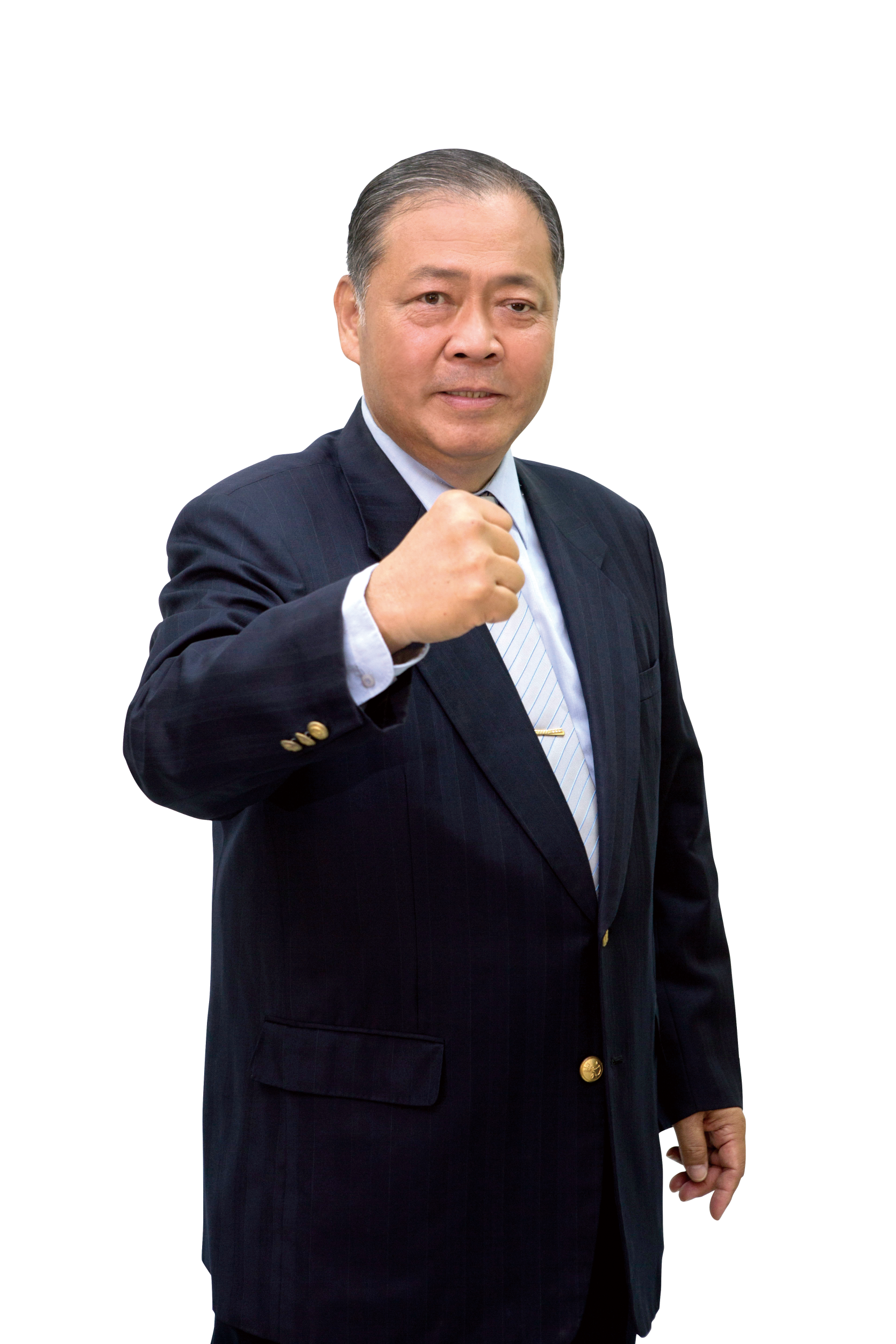
- Official portrait, 2022

11th & 13th Magistrate of Penghu
- On Leave
- In office 25 December 2022 – 18 February 2026 (Note: de facto)
- Preceded by: Lai Feng-wei
- Succeeded by: Lin Jie-shin (acting)
- In office 25 December 2014 – 25 December 2018
- Preceded by: Wang Chien-fa
- Succeeded by: Lai Feng-wei

Member of the Legislative Yuan
- In office 1 February 1993 – 31 January 1999
- Constituency: Kaohsiung II

Personal details
- Born: 25 October 1955 (age 70) Huxi, Penghu, Taiwan
- Party: Democratic Progressive Party
- Other political affiliations: Taiwan Independence Party (1993–1999)

Chen Kuang-fu (Chinese: 陳光復; pinyin: Chén Guāngfù; Wade–Giles: Chen^{2} Kuang^{1}-fu^{4}; born 25 October 1955) is a Taiwanese politician who is the Magistrate of Penghu County, serving since 25 December 2022. He held the same position from 2014 and 2018.

== Early life and education ==
Chen was born in Shagang Village, Huxi Township, Penghu County on 25 October 1955. His family moved to Kaohsiung shortly after. Chen attended Glad Tidings Bible College (喜信聖經學院) in Taichung.

== Early career ==
A member of the Tangwai movement, Chen was involved in the Kaohsiung Incident, which kickstarted his career in politics. In 1979, he ran unsuccessfully for Kaohsiung City Council. He was dubbed the "Tangwai one-eyed dragon" on election flyers. He eventually ran successfully and served as city counciller from 1985 to 1993.

In 1992, Chen was elected a member of the Legislative Yuan and represented Kaohsiung from 1993 to 1999.

Chen joined the 2005 Penghu County magistracy election under Democratic Progressive Party (DPP) on 3 December 2005. However, he lost to Wang Chien-fa of the Kuomintang. On 12 January 2008, Chen joined the 2008 Taiwanese legislative election as a DPP candidate from Penghu County constituency and lost the election as well.

Following the 2005 electoral loss, Chen founded Penghu's first distillery called Penghu First Liquor Co., modeling it after the example of Kinmen Kaoliang Liquor. The company conducted research on making liquor out of local crops, such as pumpkins, tithonia root, and cactus. Chen aimed to create local jobs and generate income for local farmers through the venture. He also had pushed for direct flight between Penghu and Liuqiu Island in Pingtung County.

== Magistrate of Penghu (2014–2018, 2022–present) ==
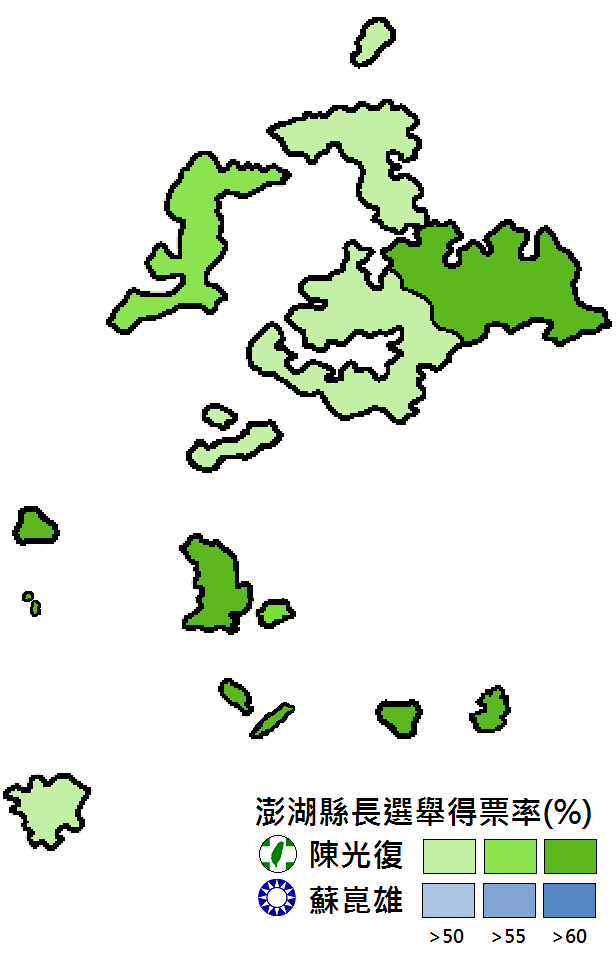
Election result map between Chen (green) and his opponent Su Kun-hsiung (blue) in 2014

In 2014, Chen joined the election campaign for magistrate of Penghu County with the slogan, Leading Penghu, for your and my happiness. His campaign focused on economic development, calling for initiatives such as winter tourism, restoration of marine resources, revitalization of disused land, elderly care, job creation, farmers' rights, conservation of cultural heritage, and teacher and civil servant benefits.

Chen eventually won in the 2014 Penghu County magistrate election held on 29 November 2014, becoming only the second person from the opposition party to secure the post.

Chen lost re-election in 2018 to former magistrate Lai Feng-wei. He ran and won again in 2022 and has served as the magistrate since December 2022. During his election campaign, he summarized his party's agenda "to protect the land and to fight for Taiwan." He emphasized the economic and tactical importance of Penghu, being in the middle of the Taiwan Strait, as part of this agenda.

In April 2023, Chen and American Institute in Taiwan official Thomas Wong jointly inaugurated the American Shelf at Penghu County Library in Magong City. The Penghu American Shelf is part of the United States Department of State's American Spaces initiative and "features story books and collection for children and youth on the United States as well as information about the study and teaching of English."

Chen supported an ongoing proposal to build the Xiying Bridge (西瀛大橋) between Magong and Xiyu, which would create a complete loop around Penghu's three largest islands.

== Personal life ==
Chen is a Christian. In February 2026, Chen fell, injured his head, and went into a coma. The Democratic Progressive Party nominated his wife Wu Shu-chin to run and succeed him as Penghu County magistrate in the 2026 local election.

== See also ==
- Penghu
