= 2007 Keelung mayoral by-election =

By-election in Taiwan

- 12 May 2007
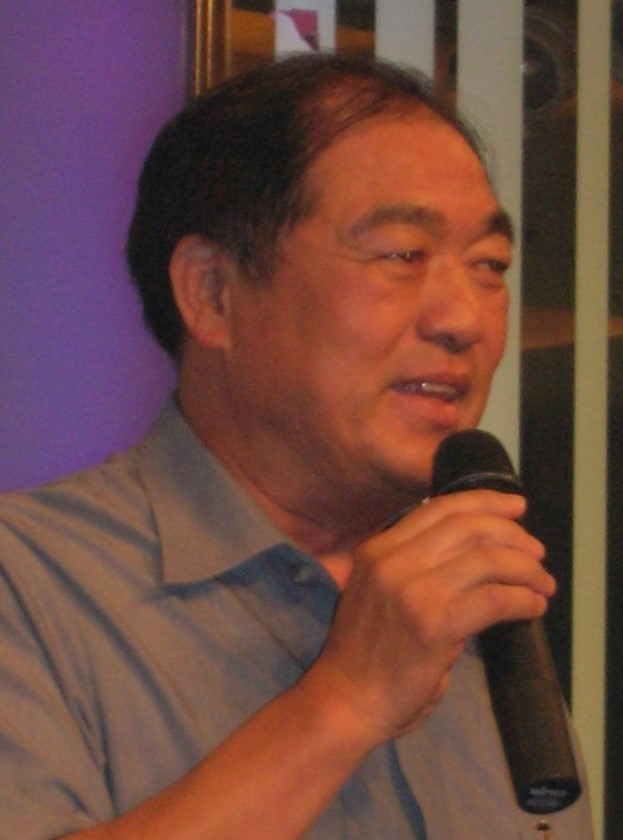

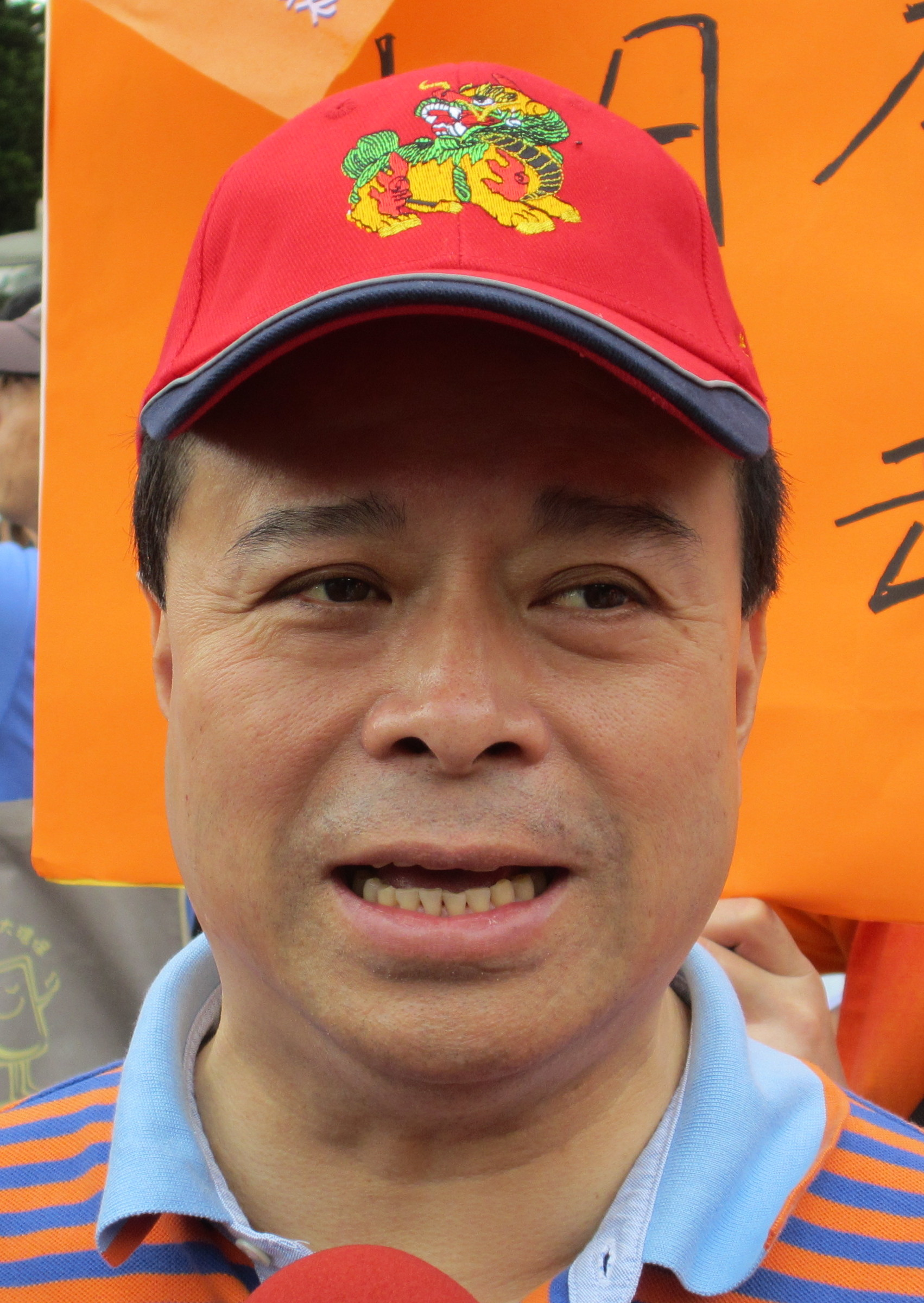

Nominee	Chang Tong-rong	Liu Wen-hsiung	Shih Shih-ming
Party	KMT	Independent	DPP
Popular vote	56,115	33,956	26,908
Percentage	47.44%	28.71%	22.75%
Nominee	Chang Tung-hsien	Chang Chao-chung
Party	Independent	Independent
Popular vote	1,105	206
Percentage	0.93%	0.17%
Mayor before election
Chen Chong-guan (Acting)
DPP
Elected Mayor
Chang Tong-rong
KMT

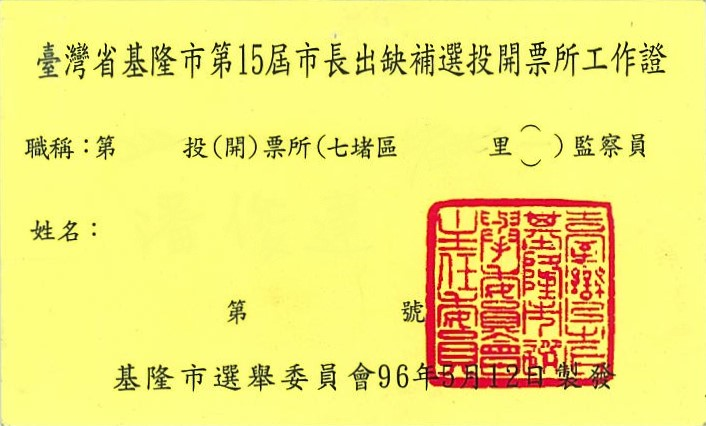
Voting station staff permit for the by-election

2007 Keelung mayoral by-election was held on 12 May 2007, three months after the death of incumbent mayor Hsu Tsai-li. Chang Tong-rong from the Kuomintang (KMT) defeated the other four candidates and held the mayorship for the party with 47% of votes.

== Background ==
One of the strongholds of Kuomintang, Keelung had been led by Hsu Tsai-li since 2001 after re-elected in 2005. However, Hsu was sentenced to 7 years in jail for corruption in 2006. Although resisting pressure for his resignation, Hsu was expelled from the party and recall petition was gaining momentum.

On 19 February 2007, Hsu died suddenly of blood poisoning, aged 60. A by-election was therefore triggered to elect a new mayor for the remaining two-year term of office. Hsu Ching-kun, Secretary General of the Government, became acting mayor, followed by appointment by Ministry of the Interior of former deputy mayor Chen Chong-guan as another acting mayor.

== Candidates ==
Chang Tong-rong, Speaker of Keelung City Council and long-time City Councillor, was endorsed by the KMT after winning the opinion poll of the party. However, the split within the Pan-Blue Coalition and the failed co-operation between the Kuomintang and People First Party (PFP) prompted Liu Wen-hsiung, PFP member of the Legislative Yuan, to run as an independent.

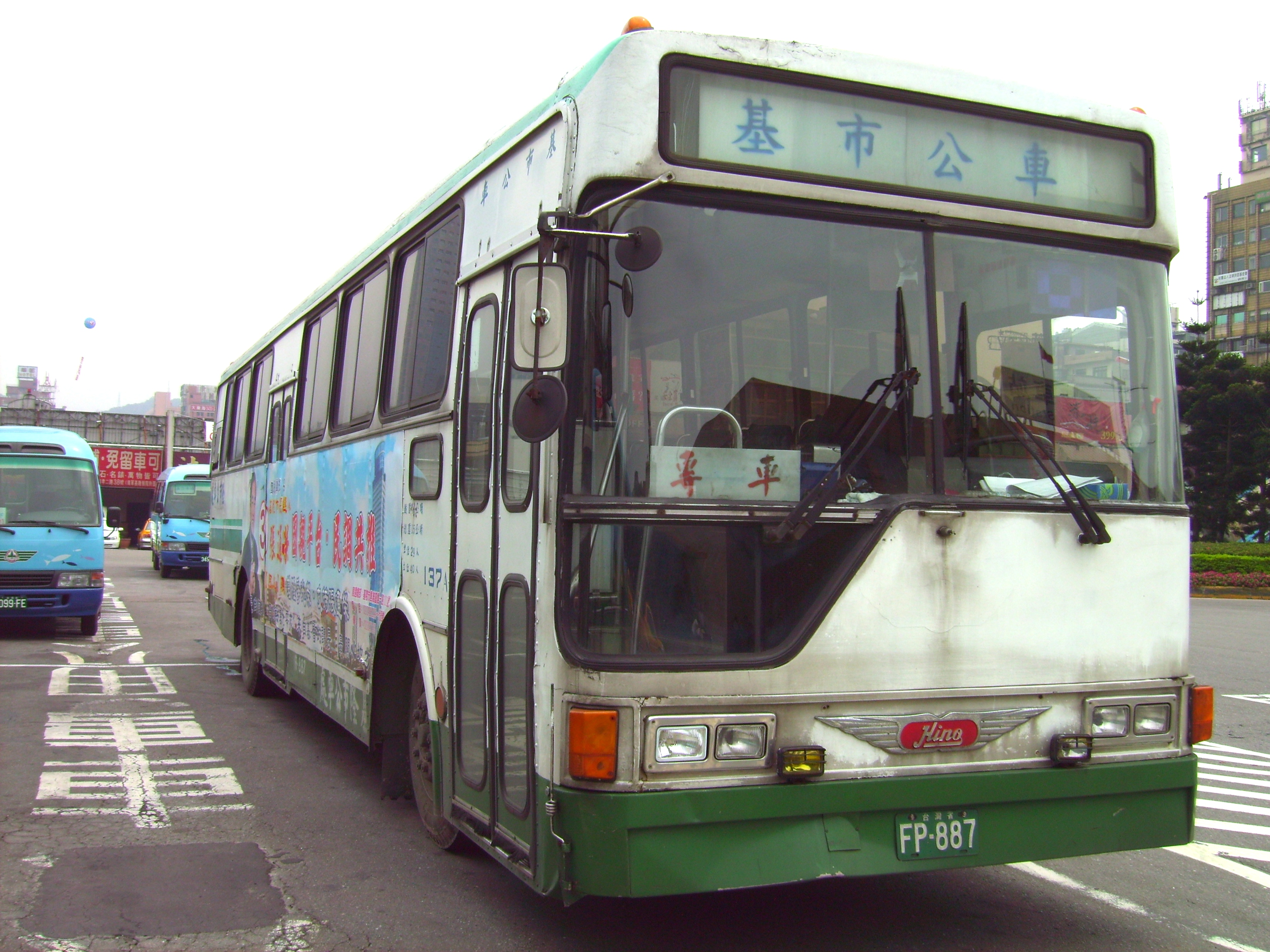
Election advertisement of Shih Shih-ming

Another City Councillor Shih Shih-ming represented Democratic Progressive Party, then the ruling party in the central government, in the election, and was backed by party seniors including Chen Shui-bian, Frank Hsieh, and Su Tseng-chang during the campaign.

Two other independents ran in the election also.

== Result ==
Candidate	Party	Votes	%
Chang Tong-rong	Kuomintang	56,115	47.44
Liu Wen-hsiung	Independent	33,956	28.71
Shih Shih-ming	Democratic Progressive Party	26,908	22.75
Chang Tung-hsien	Independent	1,105	0.93
Chang Chao-chung	Independent	206	0.17
Total		118,290	100.00
Valid votes		118,290	99.15
Invalid/blank votes		1,012	0.85
Total votes		119,302	100.00
Registered voters/turnout		294,184	40.55
