= 2026 Keelung City local election =

- 28 November 2026
- Mayoral election
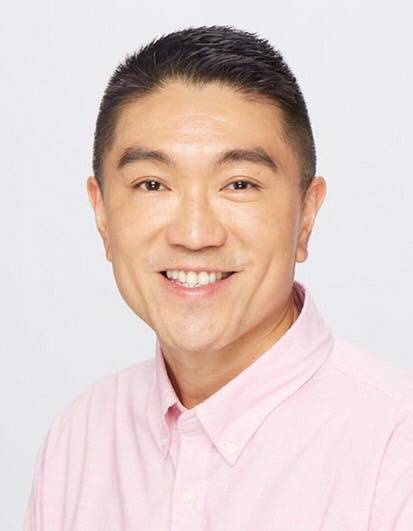

Nominee	George Hsieh	Tung Tzu-wei
Party	KMT	DPP
Alliance	KMT-TPP coalition
Incumbent Mayor
George Hsieh
KMT
- Council election
- All 32 seats in the Keelung City Council; 17 seats needed for a majority
Party	Leader	Current seats
Kuomintang	Jonathan Lin	11
Democratic Progressive Party	Lin Ming-chih	11
People First Party	James Soong	1

The 2026 Keelung City local election will take place on 28 November 2026, to elect the mayor of Keelung, and all seats to city council elections. They will be held as part of local elections across the country. Incumbent mayor George Hsieh is eligible for re-election.

== Background ==
Keelung City is the northernmost in Taiwan with a population of approximately 360 thousand, as well as being its capital. It forms the northern portion of the Taipei-Keelung metropolitan area, the largest metropolitan area in Taiwan by population.

During the martial law period, Keelung was ruled by a Kuomintang administration, barring Lin Fan-wan who served a mayor between 1960 and 1965, who was a member of the China Democratic Socialist Party. Since democratisation in the 1989 local elections, the city has seen 8 mayors, 3 from the Kuomintang, 3 from the Democratic Progressive Party, and 2 Independent. The incumbent mayor, George Hsieh was elected in 2022 and is able to run again.

== Electoral system ==
=== Mayor ===
The mayor of Keelung shall be elected by first-past-the-post voting.

=== Council ===
All 32 seats shall be elected by the single non-transferable vote electoral system, of which 5 must be filled by women, in 9 electoral districts, for a four-year term. Districts 1 to 7 shall be multi-member districts, with a gender quota of 5, totalling 30 seats. Districts 8 and 9 are single-member districts reserved for indigenous Taiwanese voters, with no gender quota, elected through first-past-the-post voting.

=== Redistricting ===
The Central Election Commission added another indigenous district, bring the total number of electoral districts to 9. The number of seats up for election in District 2 increased from 4 to 5, and the number of seats up for election in District 3 decreased from 4 to 3. No other changes were made to seat allocations.

== Candidates ==
=== Mayoral ===
Candidate	Party	Background
George Hsieh	Kuomintang	Incumbent mayor
Wei Chao-wen	Independent	
Tung Tzu-wei	Democratic Progressive Party	Keelung City Council speaker

=== Council ===
Party	Candidates	Seats contested
Kuomintang	14	7
Democratic Progressive Party	13	8
Taiwan People's Party	4	4
People First Party	3	3
Taiwan Statebuilding Party	1	1
Taiwan Progressive Party	1	1
Independents	23	9

== Polling ==
Date(s) conducted	Pollster	Sample size	George Hsieh KMT	Tung Tzu-wei DPP	Wei Chao-wen IND	None/Undecided	Lead
31 October - 1 November 2026	Apro	1,069	36.1%	35.6%	1.1%	25.8%	0.5
18-21 October 2026	DaDi Public Opinion Research	1,075	36.6%	37.0%	0.8%	25.9%	0.4
16-18 October 2026	DaDi Public Opinion Research	1,075	40.5%	33.2%	1.9%	24.3%	7.3
13-16 October 2026	National Credibility	1,071	41.3%	35.7%		23%	5.6
7-9 October 2026	Trend Poll	1,070	42.9%	38.3%		18.8%	4.6
21-24 August 2026	Shanshui Public Opinion Research	1,068	38.6%	33.2%		28.2%	5.4

== Mayoral results ==
2026 Taiwanese local elections: Keelung Mayor
Candidate	Party
George Hsieh	Kuomintang
Tung Tzu-wei	Democratic Progressive Party
Wei Chao-wen	Independent
Total

== Council results ==
-

=== By district ===
==== District 1 - Zhongzheng ====
4 Seats to elect, including 1 woman.

Keelung City Council electoral district 1
Party
Total

==== District 2 - Xinyi ====
5 seats to elect, including 1 woman.

Keelung City Council electoral district 2
Party
Total

==== District 3 - Ren'ai ====
3 seats to elect.

Keelung City Council electoral district 3
Party
Total

==== District 4 - Zhongshan ====
4 seats to elect, including 1 woman

Keelung City Council electoral district 4
Party
Total

==== District 5 - Anle ====
7 seats to elect, including 1 woman.

Keelung City Council electoral district 5
Party
Total

==== District 6 - Nuannuan ====
3 seats to elect.

Keelung City Council electoral district 6
Party
Total

==== District 7 - Qidu ====
4 seats to elect, including 1 woman.

Keelung City Council electoral district 7
Party
Total

==== District 8 - Lowland aboriginal ====
1 seat to elect.

Keelung City Council electoral district 8
Party
Independent
Independent
Total

==== District 9 - Highland aboriginal ====
1 seat to elect.

Keelung City Council electoral district 9
Party
Total
