= Jonathan Lin =

Taiwanese politician (born 1977)

Lin Pei-hsiang
- 林沛祥
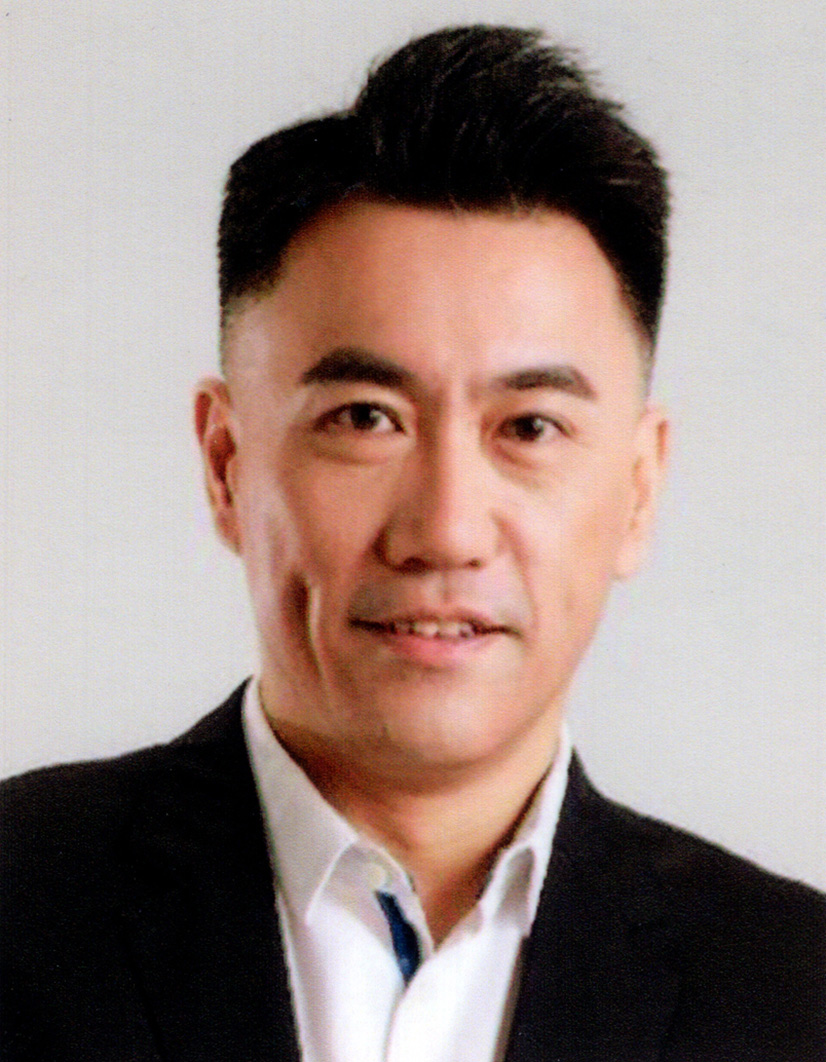

Member of the Legislative Yuan
- Incumbent
- Assumed office 1 February 2024
- Preceded by: Tsai Shih-ying
- Constituency: Keelung

Deputy Speaker of the Keelung City Council
- In office 25 December 2018 – 25 December 2022
- Speaker: Tsai Wang-lien
- Preceded by: Tsai Wang-lien
- Succeeded by: Yang Hsiu-yu

Keelung City Councilor
- In office 25 December 2018 – 31 January 2024
- Constituency: District 5 (Anle)

Personal details
- Born: 14 May 1977 (age 49) Keelung, Taiwan
- Party: Kuomintang
- Education: California State Polytechnic University, Pomona (BA); Loyola Marymount University (MBA); University of Southern California (MPA); University of La Verne (DPA)

Lin Pei-hsiang (Chinese: 林沛祥; born 14 May 1977), also known by his English name Jonathan Lin, is a Taiwanese politician who has served as a member of the Legislative Yuan representing Keelung since 2024. He was previously a member of the Keelung City Council from 2018 to 2024.

== Early life and education ==
Lin was born on 14 May 1977 in Keelung, Taiwan. His father, Lin Shui-mu, served two terms as Mayor of Keelung and two terms in the Taiwan Provincial Assembly, and his mother, Hsu Shao-ping, served six consecutive terms in the Legislative Yuan.

Lin graduated from Er Xin High School in Keelung. At age 15, he went to the United States to study, and attended boarding school in New Jersey. He graduated from California State Polytechnic University, Pomona. He then earned an M.B.A. from Loyola Marymount University, an M.P.A. from the University of Southern California, and his Doctor of Public Administration (D.P.A.) from the University of La Verne in 2009. His doctoral dissertation was titled, Revitalizing Keelung Harbor: A Study to Improve Competitiveness of an International Port.

After receiving his doctorate, Lin taught management science at National Taiwan Ocean University. He completed postdoctoral research at National Tsing Hua University.

== Political career ==
In 2013, Lin considered running for mayor in Keelung, and backed a bid by the Port of Keelung for a Rubber Duck display. After George Hsieh rejected the Kuomintang nomination for the Keelung mayoralty in 2014, Lin supported the eventual nominee Hsieh Li-kung. Lin contested a Kuomintang party primary against Hau Lung-pin prior to the 2016 Taiwanese legislative election, necessitated after George Hsieh additionally declined to run for reelection to the Legislative Yuan. Lin was elected to the Keelung City Council in 2018, with the largest vote share in his district, and contested the body's deputy speakership election, winning the office due to a Kuomintang majority in the council. He won reelection in 2022, again leading his district in vote share. In July 2023, Lin accepted the Kuomintang's nomination in the Legislative Yuan's Keelung City Constituency, and faced Democratic Progressive Party candidate Cheng Wen-ting in the January 2024 Taiwanese legislative election. Lin replaced Tsai Shih-ying in the office.

In his first year as a legislator, Lin has commented on climate change policies, criticized the Constitutional Court for its 2024 ruling on the death penalty, urged reform of Taiwan's ship insurance system, proposed amendments to the All-out Defense Mobilization Readiness Act and the Public Officials Election and Recall Act, and supported a legislative motion stating the Republic of China's opposition to the United Nations General Assembly Resolution 2758.

In 2025, Lin faced recall for, amongst multiple reasons, inciting parliamentary violence, lambasting civil servants and undermining national security, defaming civil groups that initiated the unseating campaign, and misogynistic behaviour. In May, Lin controversially said in an online political talk show that he believes the civic groups leading the 2025 Taiwanese mass electoral recall campaigns were "a collection of socially marginalized individuals." The bid was defeated by a majority of votes against and without reaching the necessary threshold of 75,995.
