= Hsu Kuo-yung =

Taiwanese politician (born 1958)

- 徐國勇
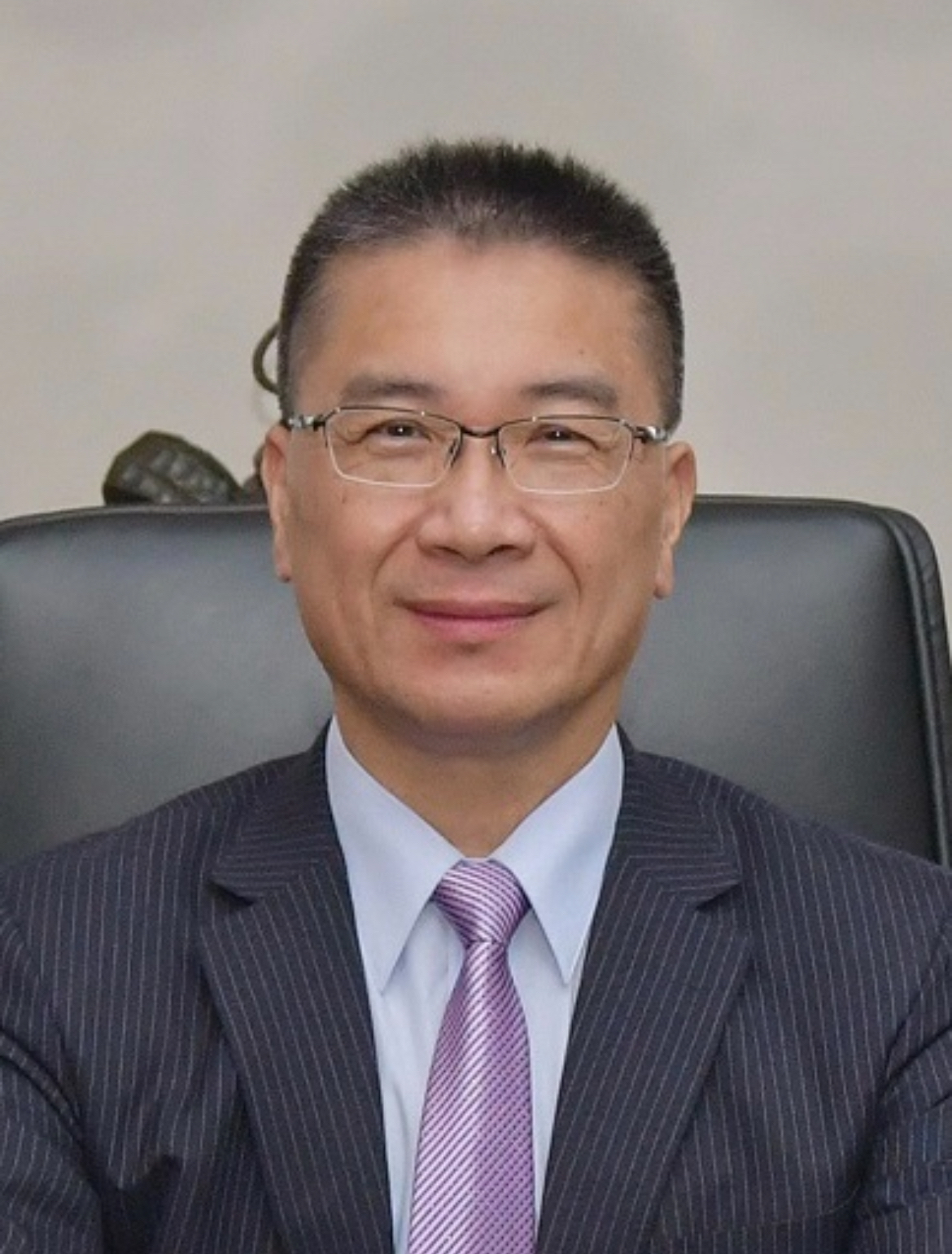
- Official portrait, 2018

26th Secretary-General of the Democratic Progressive Party
- Incumbent
- Assumed office 25 August 2025
- Chairman: Lai Ching-te
- Preceded by: Ho Po-wen (acting); Lin Yu-chang

32nd Minister of the Interior
- In office 16 July 2018 – 7 December 2022
- Prime Minister: Lai Ching-te; Su Tseng-chang
- Preceded by: Yeh Jiunn-rong
- Succeeded by: Hua Ching-chun (acting)

Minister without Portfolio
- In office 25 December 2017 – 15 July 2018
- Prime Minister: Lai Ching-te

5th Spokesperson of the Executive Yuan
- In office 1 October 2016 – 15 July 2018
- Prime Minister: Lin Chuan; Lai Ching-te
- Preceded by: Tung Chen-yuan
- Succeeded by: Kolas Yotaka

Member of the Legislative Yuan
- In office 1 February 2016 – 30 September 2016
- Succeeded by: Chiu Tai-yuan
- Constituency: Party-list
- In office 1 February 2005 – 1 January 2008
- Constituency: Taipei 1

Taipei City Councillor
- In office 25 December 2002 – 31 January 2005
- Constituency: Taipei II (Neihu, Nangang)

Personal details
- Born: 7 June 1958 (age 68) Taipei, Taiwan
- Party: Democratic Progressive Party
- Relatives: Hsu Chia-ching
- Education: National Chung Hsing University (LLB); National Taiwan Ocean University (MA, PhD)

Hsu Kuo-yung (Chinese: 徐國勇; pinyin: Xú Guóyǒng; born 7 June 1958) is a Taiwanese politician and media personality who is currently the Secretary-General of the Democratic Progressive Party since 2025. He was a member of the Legislative Yuan from 2005 to 2008, and again in 2016. Hsu served as the minister of Interior from 2018 to 2022. Later, Hsu become the host for the FTV News political program "National Bravest" from 2023 to 2025.

== Early life and education ==
Hsu was born on 7 June 1958 in Taipei, Taiwan. His parents operated a stall selling Ló͘-bah-pn̄g at Shilin Market in Taipei. As a child, Hsu frequently helped his parents at their food stall. He attended Longshan Elementary School in Taipei's Wanhua District.

After finishing junior high school in 1973, Hsu's parents arranged for him to enter the workforce, after which he enrolled at the tuition-free Taiwan Provincial Taipei Teachers' Junior College. He completed the college's five-year teacher-training program and graduated from its special education division in 1978. He was assigned to teach at Longshan Elementary School, his former primary school, as a special education teacher. After working as a teacher, he completed military service as a naval supply officer and was stationed on Kinmen.

While still teaching, Hsu took night classes to study sociology at National Chung Hsing University. After the university denied his request to transfer to its law department, he withdrew from the sociology program and successfully entered the second year of the university's evening law program through a separate entrance examination. He graduated with a Bachelor of Laws (LL.B.) degree, then entered private practice.

While working as a lawyer, Hsu earned a master's degree in maritime law from National Taiwan Ocean University in 2001. His master's thesis was titled, A Study of the Compulsory Enforcement of Ships (船舶強制執行之研究). He later earned his Ph.D. in law from the university in 2012. His doctoral dissertation was titled, Judicial Resolution of Taiwan–Japan Maritime Disputes from the Perspective of Taiwan's Legal Status (從臺灣法律地位論台日海域司法解決).

== Political careers ==
Hsu served as the Taipei City councillor in 2002 until his inauguration as the member of the Legislative Yuan, in 2005, of the 1st constituency of Taipei City.

=== 2008 legislative election ===
- Eligible voters: 280,614
- Total votes cast (Ratio): 171,665 (61.17%)
- Valid Votes (Ratio): 169,272 (98.61%)
- Invalid Votes (Ratio): 2,393 (1.39%)

No.	Candidate	Party	Votes	Ratio	Elected
1	Jhuang Wan Yun (莊婉均)	Independent	1,684	0.99%	
2	Jhang Cing Yuan (張慶源)	Independent	470	0.28%	
3	Alex Tsai	Kuomintang	105,375	62.26%	
4	Syu Jia Chen (許家琛)	Independent	159	0.09%	
5	Ke Yi Min (柯逸民)	Green Party Taiwan	1,580	0.93%	
6	Hsu Kuo-yung	Democratic Progressive Party	60,004	35.45%	

In 2016, he returned as a member of the member of the Legislative Yuan for the DPP proportional representation constituency.

In October 2016, after the resignation of the Executive Yuan spokesperson Tong Cheng-yuan, whose role was transferred to National Security Council, Hsu resigned his membership in the Legislative Yuan and succeeded Tong as the spokesperson. Chiu Tai-yuan succeeded Hsu's legislative membership.

In July 2018, then-interior minister Yeh Jiunn-rong was appointed as the new education minister. Then-spokesperson Hsu succeeded Yeh as the interior minister until his resignation in 2022 due health issues.

In August 2025, Hsu was named secretary-general of the Democratic Progressive Party.

== Media careers ==
In December 2022, FTV News announces a new political program "National Bravest" (全國第一勇) (Note: In his name, Hsu Kuo-yung (徐國勇), the "yung (勇)" means brave in Mandarin, the program uses his name as a rhyme with the program name.) and he will be the host starting 26th of the same month.

== Other notes ==
- When he was the spokesperson for the Executive Yuan, he was once sent to the hospital because of accidentally eating Alocasia odora(姑婆芋), And was nicknamed "Gu Po Yong"(姑婆勇).
