= Liu Wen-hsiung (1954–2017) =

Taiwanese politician

- 劉文雄
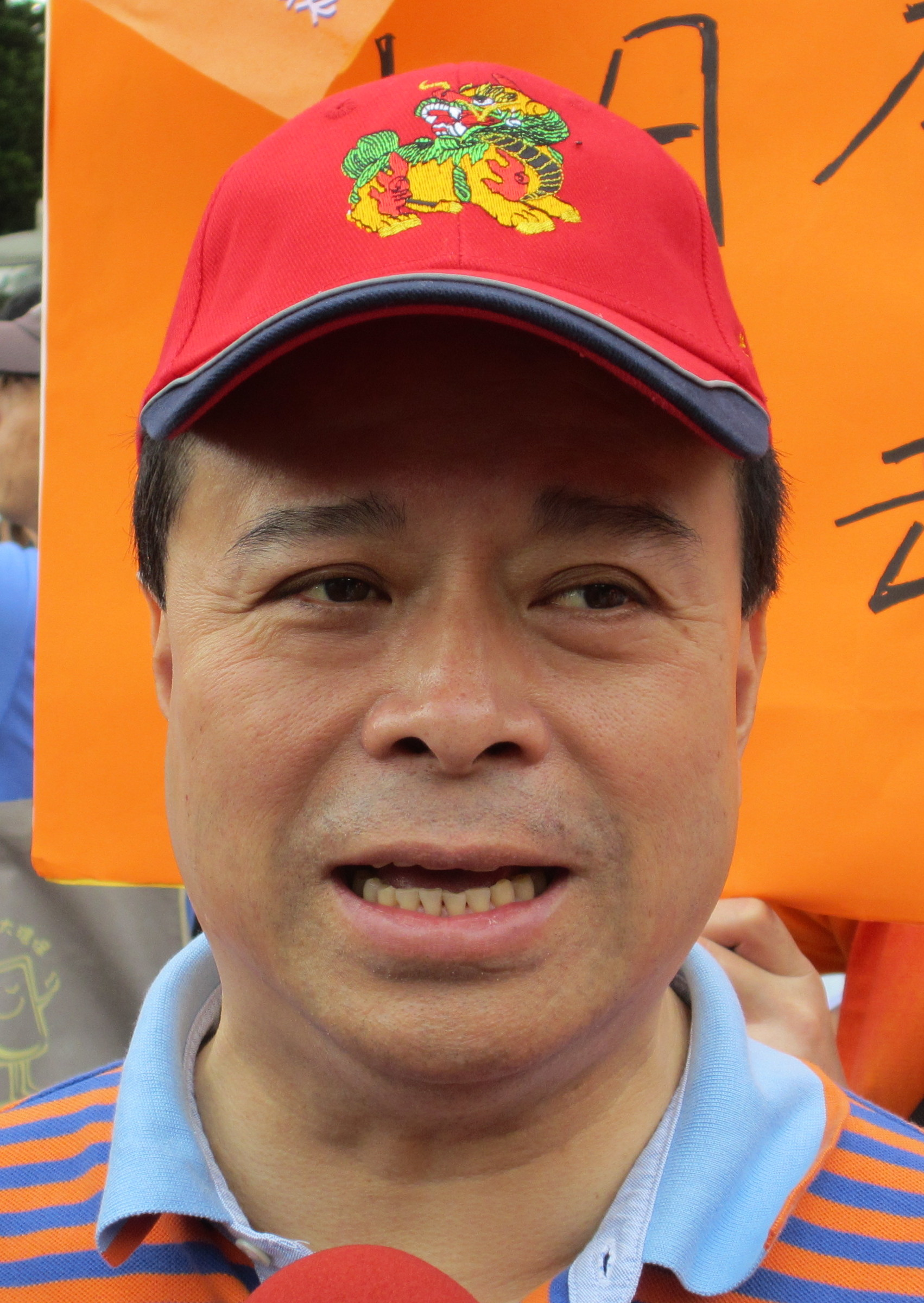
- Lin in 2012

Member of the Legislative Yuan
- In office 1 February 2005 – 31 January 2008
- Constituency: Republic of China
- In office 1 February 1999 – 31 January 2005
- Constituency: Keelung

Personal details
- Born: 18 September 1954 Keelung, Taiwan
- Died: 31 July 2017 (aged 62) Anle, Keelung, Taiwan
- Party: People First Party (2000–2017)
- Other political affiliations: Kuomintang (until 2000)
- Education: National Chengchi University (BA); National Taiwan Ocean University (MS); Jinan University (PhD)

Liu Wen-hsiung (Chinese: 劉文雄; pinyin: Liú Wénxióng; 8 September 1954 – 31 July 2017) was a Taiwanese politician who served in the Legislative Yuan from 1999 to 2008.

== Early life and education ==
Liu was born in Keelung in 1954. His parents were waishengren.

After graduating from Cheng Kung Senior High School, Liu studied land administration at National Chengchi University and graduated with a bachelor's degree. He then earned a master's degree in ship management from National Taiwan Ocean University and a Ph.D. in Asian studies from Jinan University.

== Political career ==
Liu served two terms on the Taiwan Provincial Council before his 1998 election to the Legislative Yuan. The Kuomintang formally began expulsion proceedings against Liu in December 1999, because he supported the 2000 independent presidential campaign of James Soong. Liu later joined Soong's People First Party, and was the PFP's legislative whip. On 3 December 2005, he joined the Republic of China local election for the Keelung City mayoralty. However, he finished in third place.

2005 Keelung City Mayoralty Election result
No.	Candidate	Party	Votes
1	Chen Chien-ming	TSU	58,243
2	Hsu Tsai-li	KMT	76,162
3	Liu Wen-hsiung	PFP	47,932
4	Wang Tuoh	DPP	2,771

In 2006, Liu accused Kuo Yao-chi, then the Minister of Transportation and Communications, of appointing Wu Cheng-chih, a friend who was recommended by her husband, to the secretary-general position of the China Aviation Development Foundation as a form of nepotism; Liu said that Weng did not have the proper aviation background. Kuo said that she did not practice nepotism and that she would seek to have action taken against Liu. The next year, Liu ran in the Keelung mayoral by-election and was a reported candidate for the Control Yuan. Liu later became deputy secretary-general of the People First Party. Liu ran in the 2016 legislative elections as a representative of Keelung district, but lost.

Legislative Election 2016: Keelung district
Party	Candidate	Votes	%	±%
DPP	Tsai Shih-ying	78,707	41.45	
Kuomintang	Hau Lung-pin	68,632	36.15	
People First	Liu Wen-hsiung	23,485	12.37	
Minkuotang	Yang Shicheng	19,045	10.03	
Majority		10,075	5.30	
Total valid votes		189,869	98.76	
Rejected ballots		2,378	1.24	
DPP gain from Kuomintang		Swing		
Turnout		192,247	64.31	
Registered electors		298,947		

In 2017, he was formally nominated to a seat on the Control Yuan.

== Personal life ==
Liu was a Taiwanese Muslim. He suffered a heart attack in July 2017, which led to a coma. He was moved to Chang Gung Memorial Hospital in Keelung on 21 July, where he died on 31 July 2017, aged 62. His body was sent to Taipei Grand Mosque where funeral prayer was performed before he was buried.
