= Xinshan Dam =

Dam in Anle, Keelung, Taiwan

Xinshan Dam 新山壩
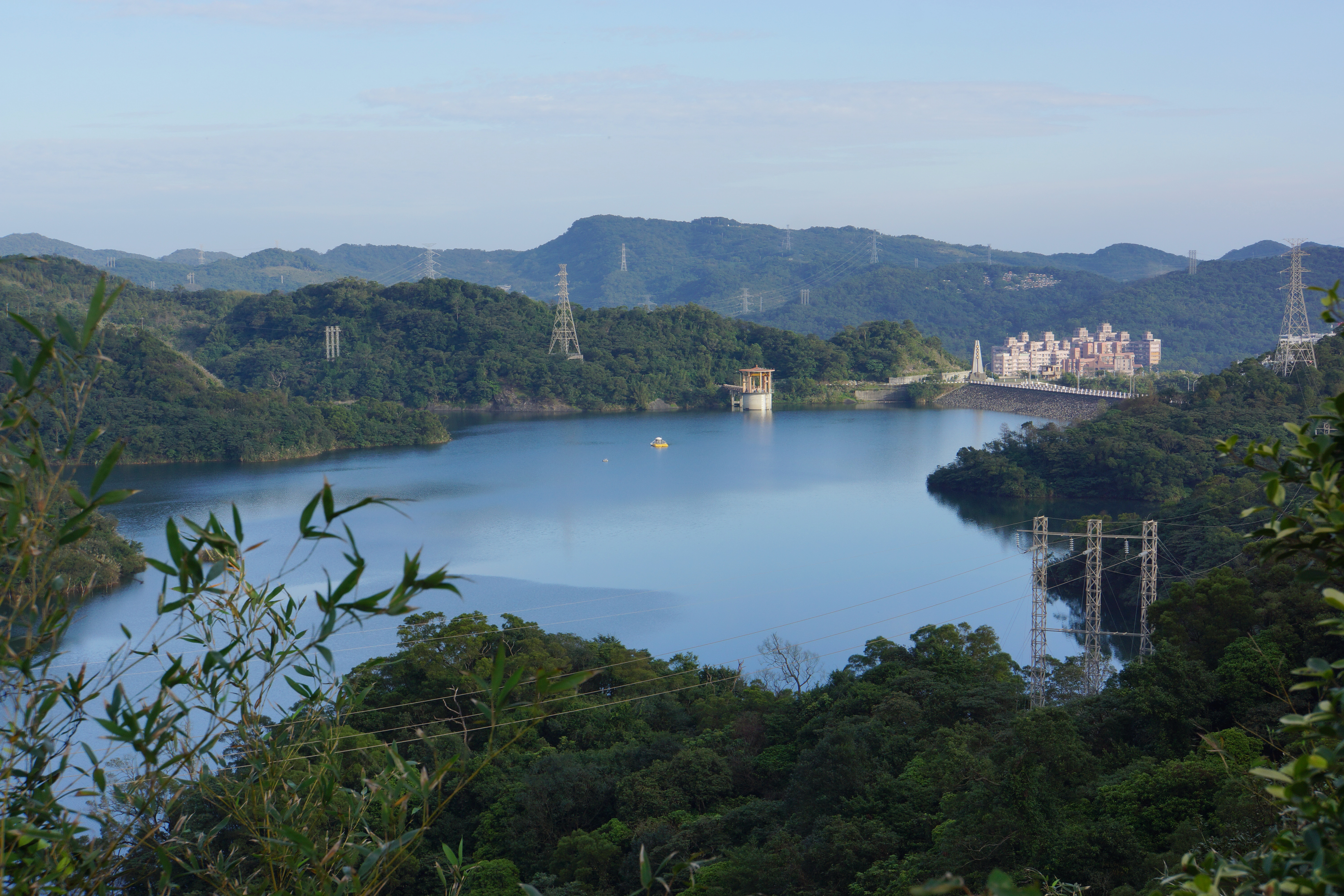

- Taiwan
- Location: Anle, Keelung, Taiwan
- Coordinates: 25°07′49.5″N 121°42′33.0″E
- Status: Operational
- Opening date: 1980; 46 years ago

Dam and spillways
- Type of dam: embankment dam

Reservoir
- Total capacity: 10,000,000 m^{3} (8,100 acre⋅ft)

The Xinshan Dam (traditional Chinese: 新山壩; simplified Chinese: 新山坝; pinyin: Xīnshān Bà) is a dam located in Anle District, Keelung, Taiwan. The dam supplies water to Keelung and New Taipei districts of Jinshan, Ruifang, Wanli and Xizhi Districts.

== History ==
The dam was completed in 1980. The reservoir underwent expansion capacity in 1998 from 4 million cubic meters (140×10^{6} cu ft) to 10 million cubic meters (350×10^{6} cu ft).

== Transportation ==
The dam is accessible west of Keelung Station of Taiwan Railway.

== See also ==
- List of dams and reservoirs in Taiwan
