= Dawulun Fort =

Former fort in Keelung, Taiwan

Dawulun Fort, Ta Wu Lun Fort
- 大武崙砲台, 大武崙礮臺
- Anle, Keelung, Taiwan
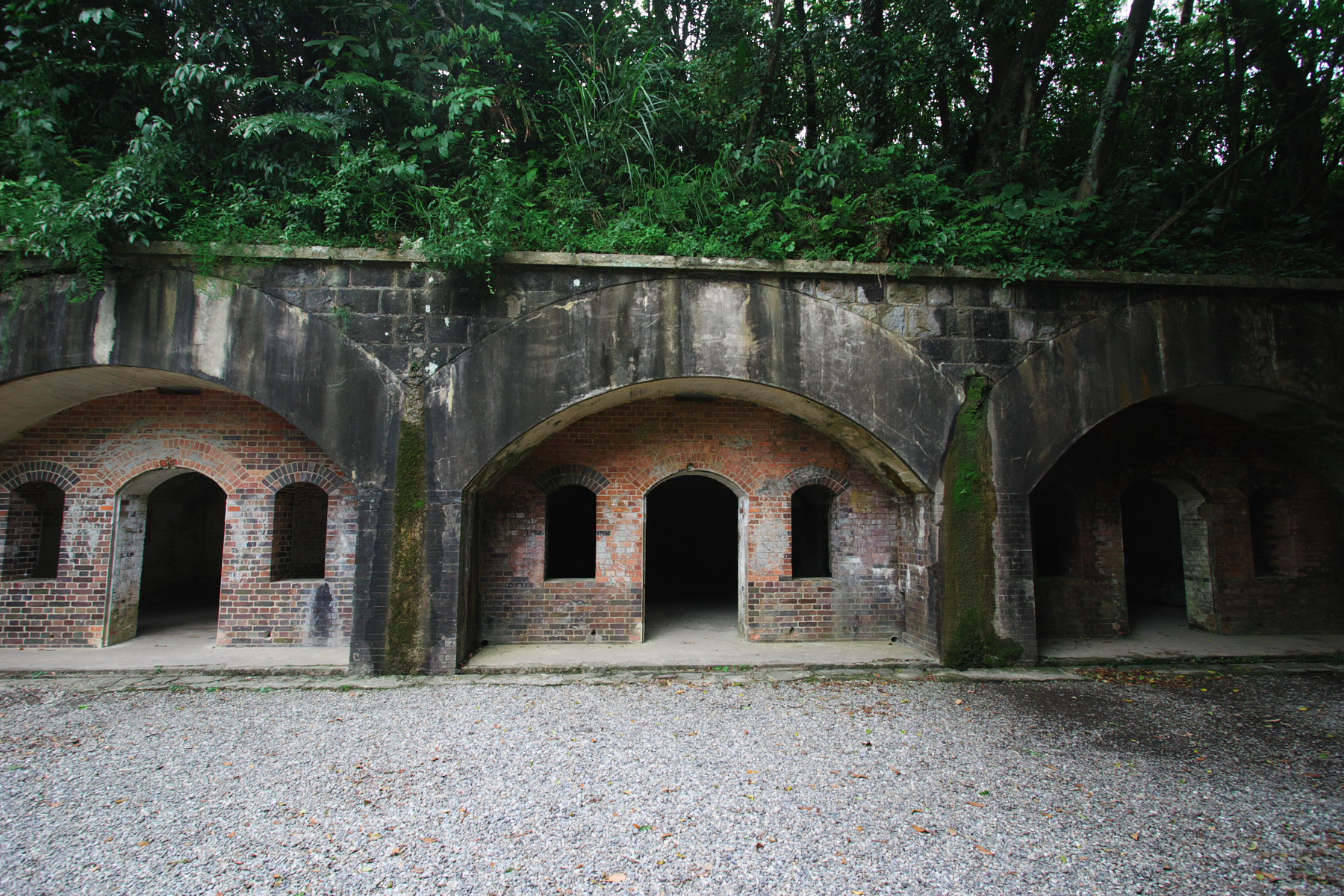

Site information
- Type: fort

Location
- Taiwan
- Coordinates: 25°09′31.2″N 121°42′32.2″E

Site history
- Built: 1820

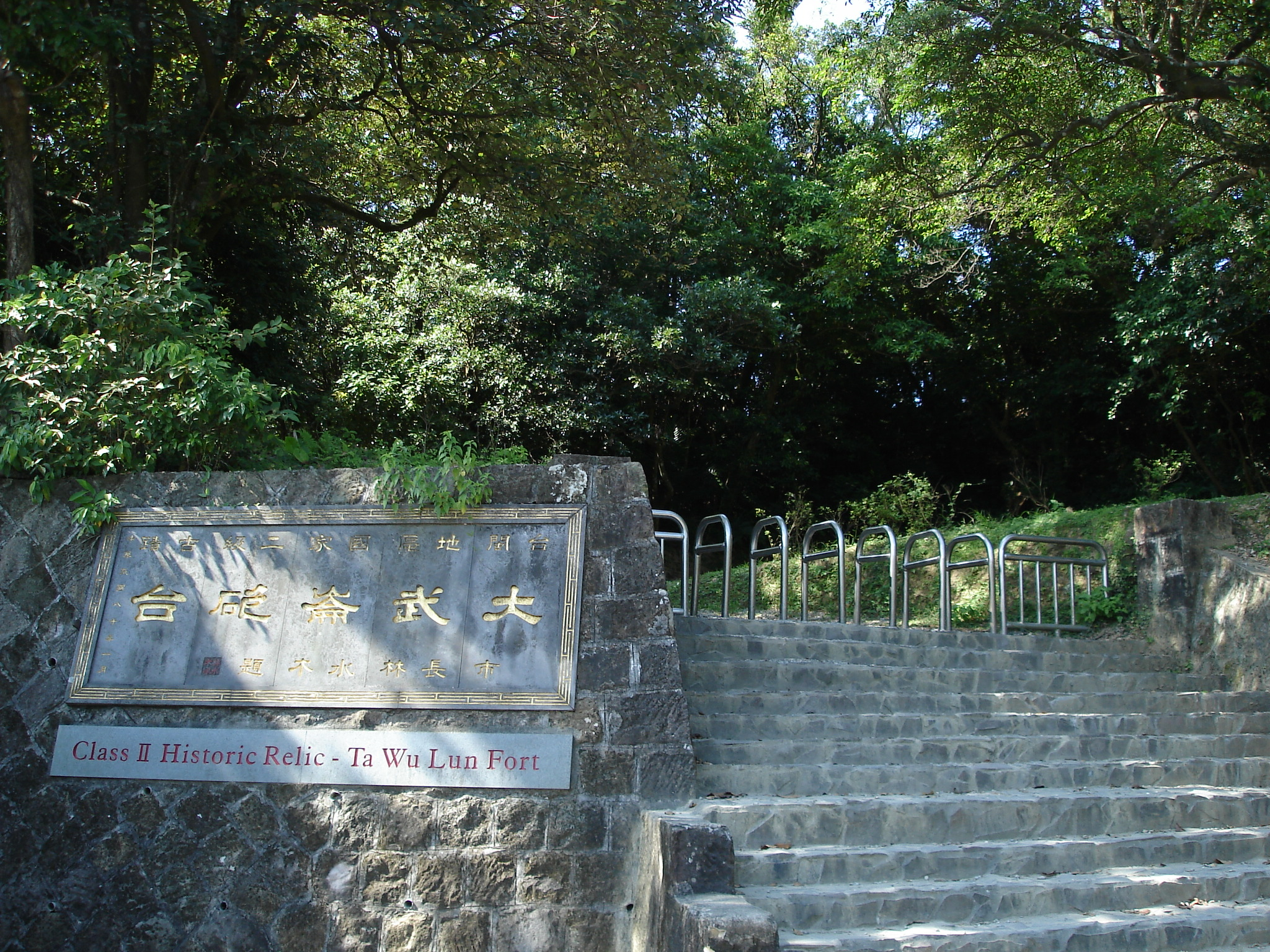
The fort entrance

The Dawulun Fort, also Ta Wu Lun Fort, (traditional Chinese: 大武崙砲台, 大武崙礮臺; simplified Chinese: 大武仑炮台, 大武仑礮台; pinyin: Dàwǔlún Pàotái; Wade–Giles: Ta^{4}-wu^{3}-lun^{2} P'ao^{4}-t'ai^{2}) is a former fort on Mount Dawulun (Ta-wu-lun, Dia buron), Anle District, Keelung, Taiwan.

== History ==
The fort was built in 1820 and it used to be a very important military base to safeguard the west side of Keelung Harbor. During the First Opium War in 1840 and Sino-French War in 1884, the court of Qing Dynasty sent military forces to guard the place.

== Architecture ==
The area consists of fort, chassis, mechanical belt, tunnels, barracks, trenches and storage room. Walls are made of stones with arched windows. It is located at 231 meters above sea level.

== Transportation ==
The fort is accessible by bus from Keelung Station of Taiwan Railway.

== Gallery ==
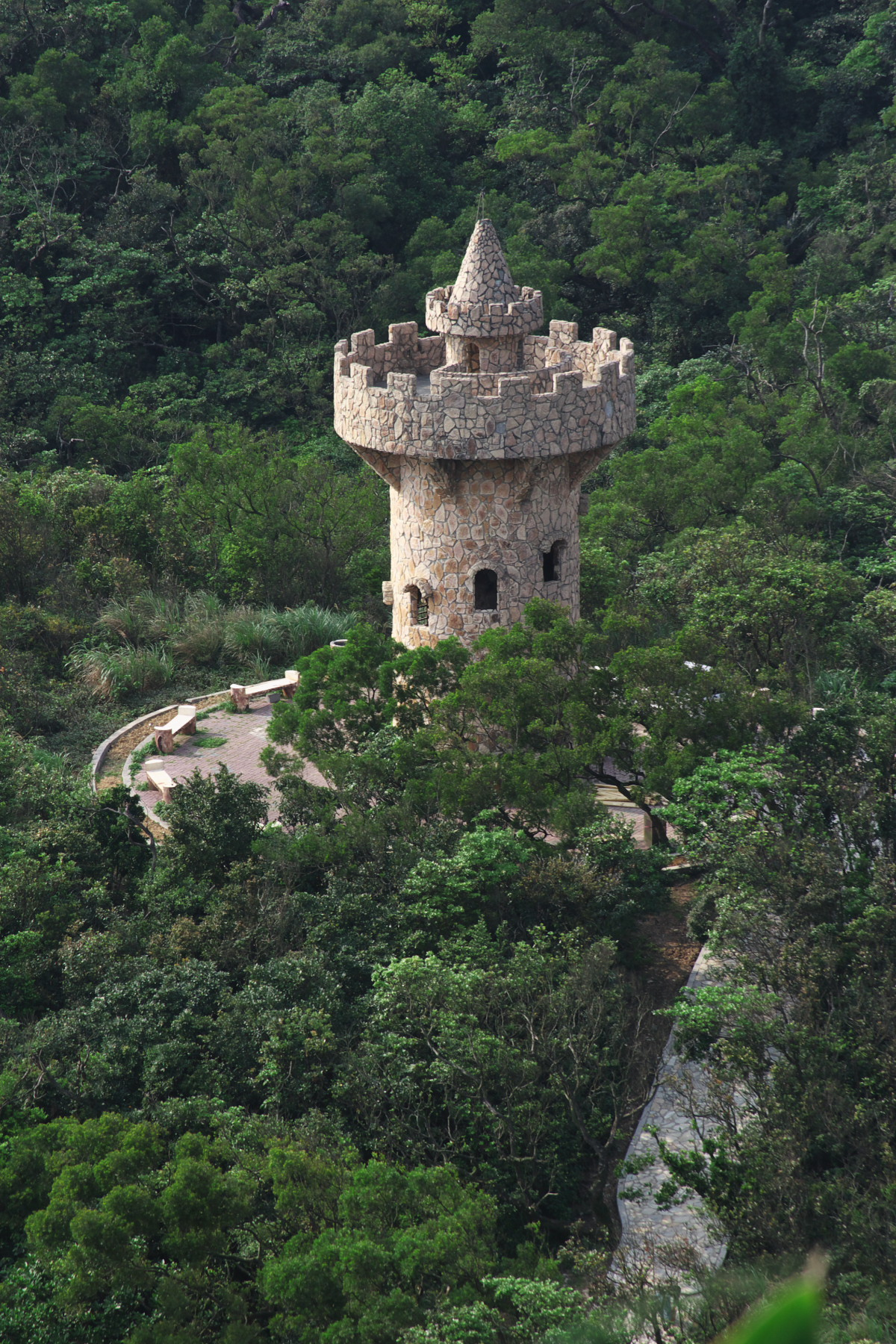

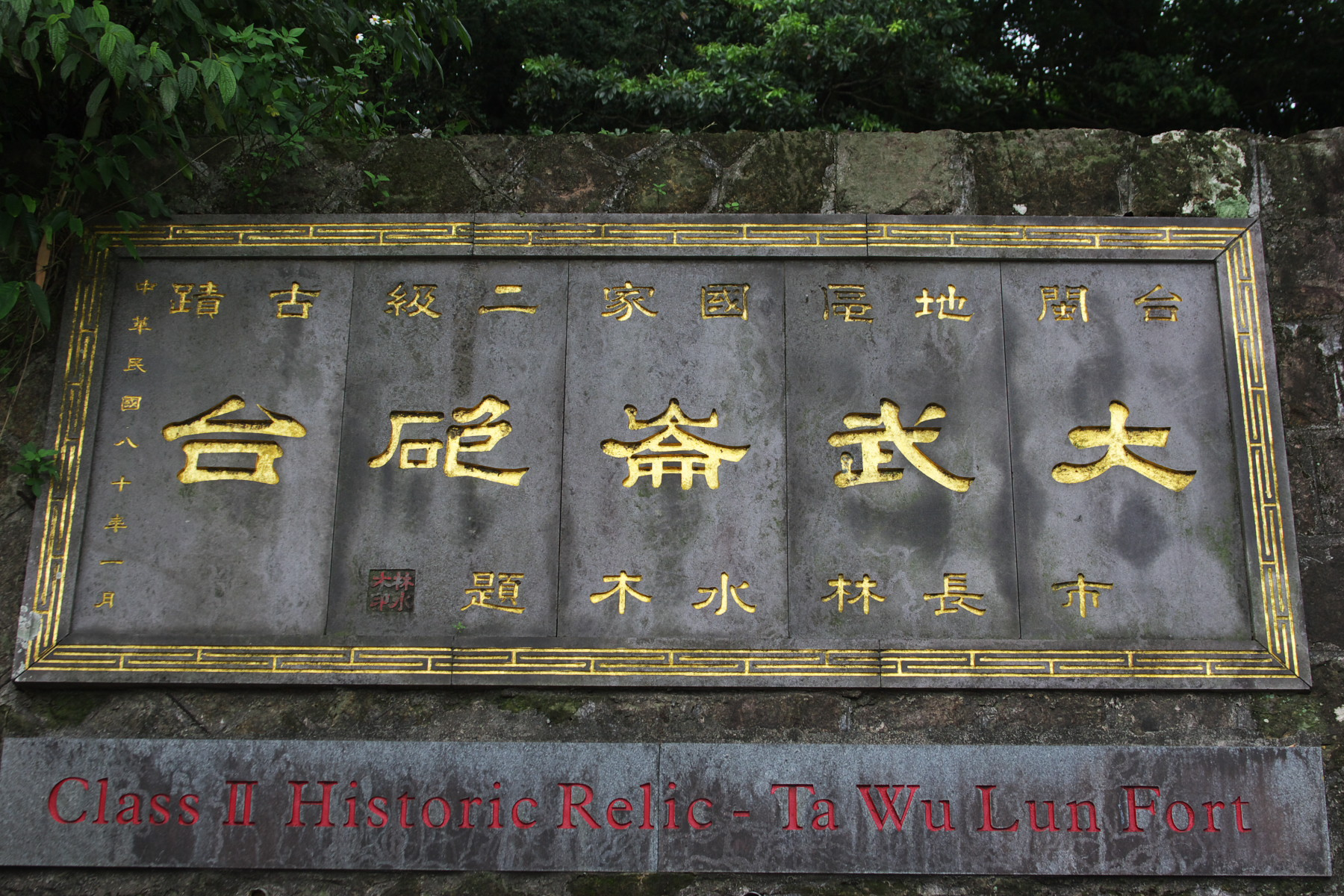

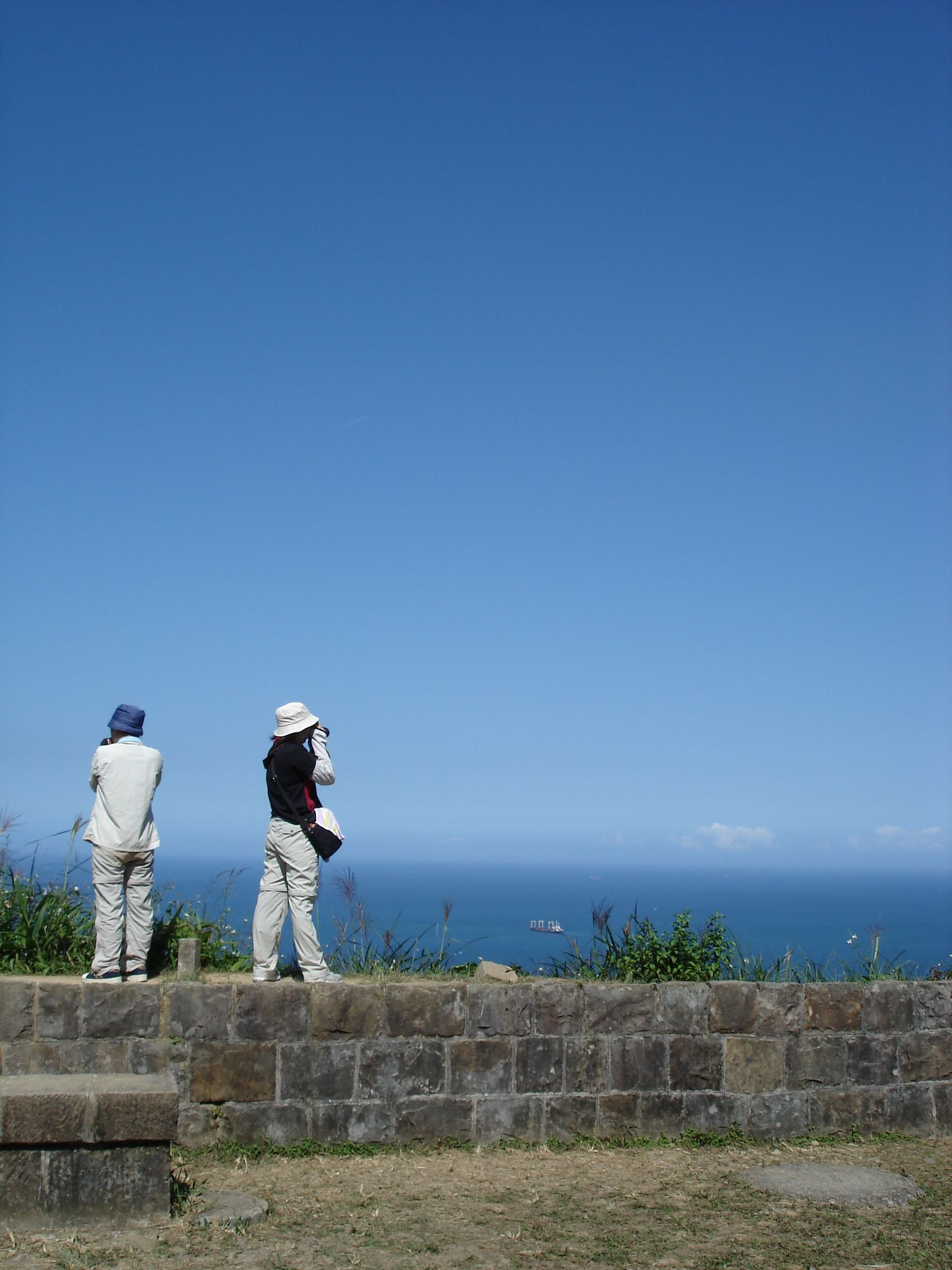

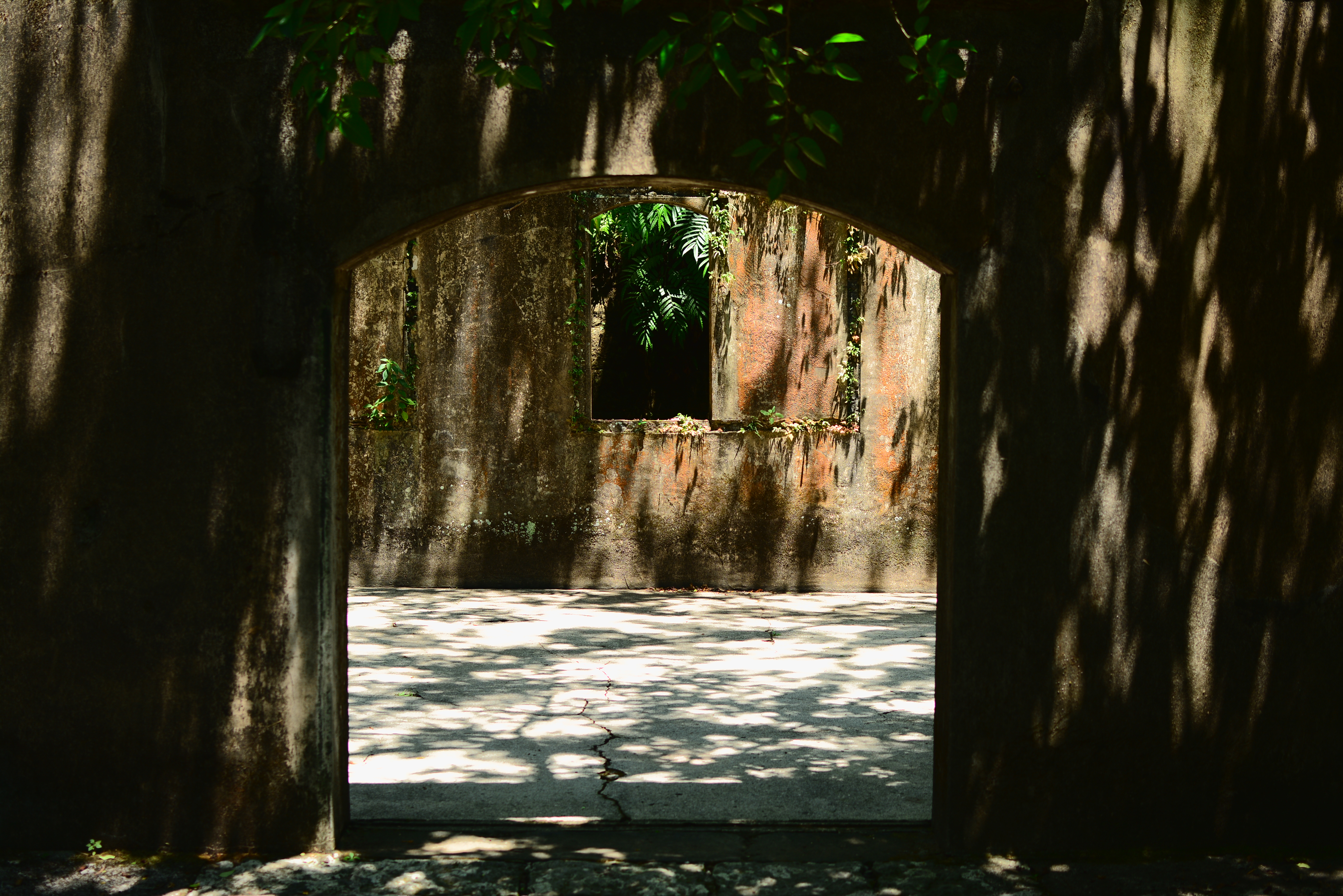

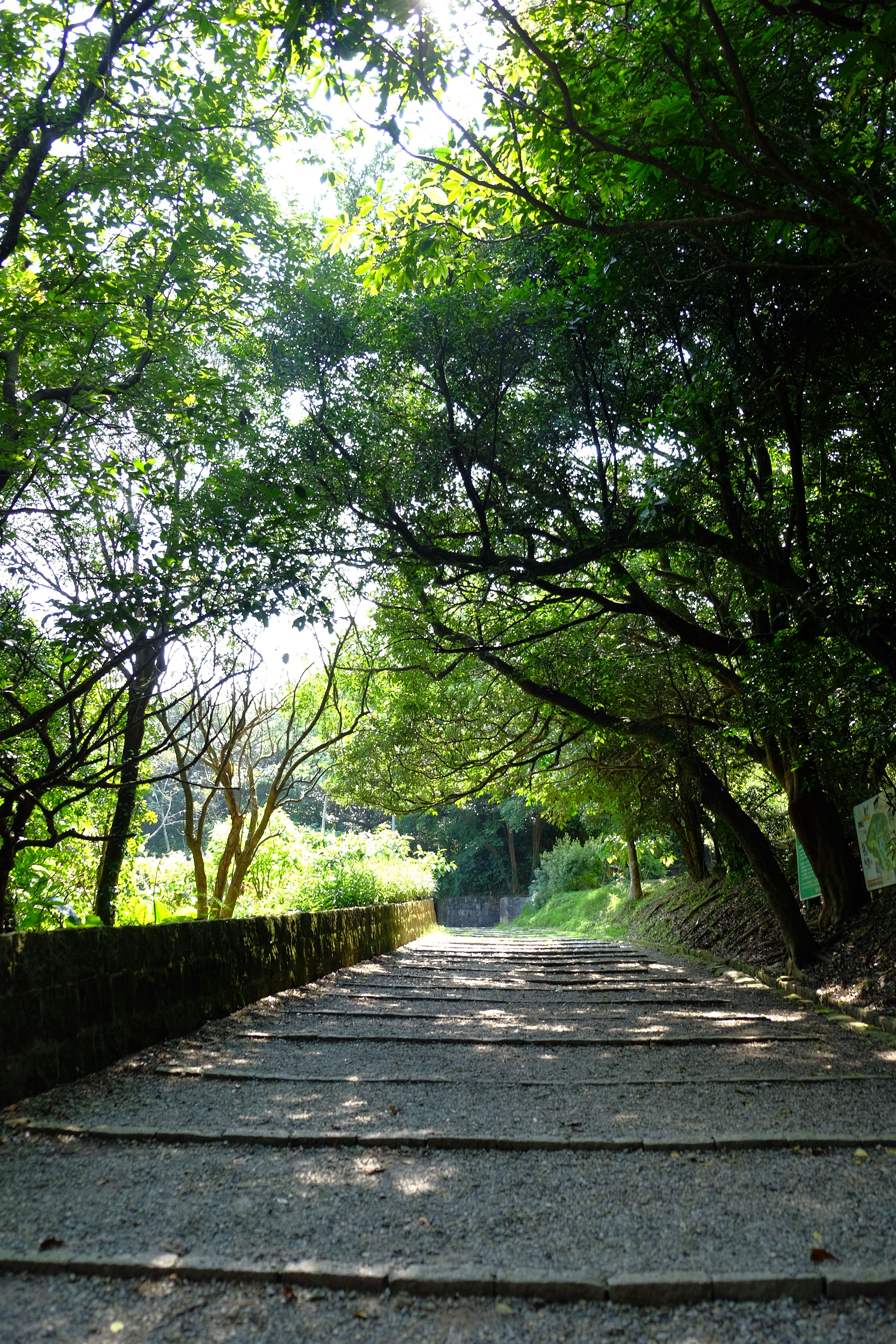

== See also ==
- List of tourist attractions in Taiwan
