= Keelung City Constituency =

Constituency of the Legislative Yuan of Taiwan

Keelung City
- Single-member constituency for the Legislative Yuan
- District: Keelung City
- Electorate: 309,428

Current constituency
- Created: 2008
- Number of members: 1

Keelung City is represented in the Legislative Yuan since 2008 by one at-large single-member constituency (Keelung City Constituency, Chinese: 基隆市選舉區; pinyin: Jīlóng Shì Xuǎnjǔ Qū).

== Current district ==
- Keelung

== Legislators ==
Kuomintang Democratic Progressive Party People First Party

Election	Taiwan Province 17th constituency		
1989	Chang Chien-hua		
	Keelung City		
1992	Chang Chien-hua	Lee Chin-yung	
1995	Hsu Shao-ping	Lee Chin-yung	
	Keelung City		
1998	Hsu Shao-ping	Liu Wen-hsiung (KMT →PFP)	Wang Tuoh
2001	Hsu Shao-ping	Liu Wen-hsiung (KMT →PFP)	Wang Tuoh
2004	Hsu Shao-ping	George Hsieh (PFP →KMT)	Wang Tuoh
	Keelung City		
2008 7th	George Hsieh		
2012 8th	George Hsieh		
2016 9th	Tsai Shih-ying		
2020 10th	Tsai Shih-ying		
2024 11th	Jonathan Lin		

== Election results ==
=== 2024 ===
Legislative Election 2024: Keelung City Constituency
Party	Candidate	Votes	%	±%
Kuomintang	Jonathan Lin	91,986	43.62	+5.59
DPP	Cheng Wen-Ting	69,741	33.07	−14.22
Independent	Wang Hsing-Chi	37,260	17.67	
Taiwan Obasang Political Equality Party	Xie Hai-Jing	8,192	3.88	
Family Basic Income	Qiu Shao-Yu	2,361	1.12	
Independent	Huang Chieh-Yang	1,331	0.63	
Majority		22,245	10.55	
Total valid votes		210,871		
Kuomintang gain from DPP		Swing		

=== 2020 ===
2020 Legislative election
	Elected			Runner-up		
Incumbent	Candidate	Party	Votes (%)	Candidate	Party	Votes (%)
DPP Tsai Shih-ying	Tsai Shih-ying	DPP	47.29%	Song Wei-li	Kuomintang	38.03%

=== 2016 ===
2016 Legislative election
	Elected			Runner-up		
Incumbent	Candidate	Party	Votes (%)	Candidate	Party	Votes (%)
Kuomintang; George Hsieh	Tsai Shih-ying	DPP	41.45%	Hau Lung-pin	Kuomintang	36.15%
