= Hua Ching-chun =

Taiwanese policy analyst

- 花敬群
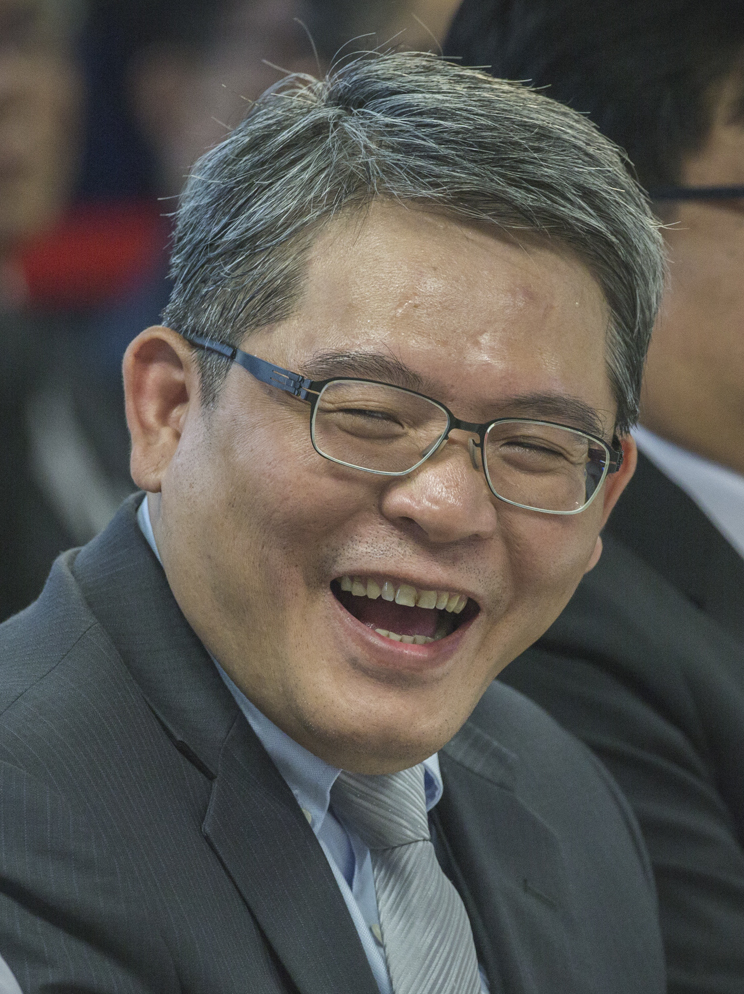
- Hua in 2018

1st Chairman of the National Housing and Urban Regeneration Center
- Incumbent
- Assumed office 1 August 2018 (Note: Acting from 1 August 2018 to 20 May 2024)
- Prime Minister: William Lai; Su Tseng-chang; Chen Chien-jen; Cho Jung-tai
- Preceded by: Position established

33rd Minister of the Interior
- Acting; 7 December 2022 – 31 January 2023
- Prime Minister: Su Tseng-chang
- Preceded by: Hsu Kuo-yung
- Succeeded by: Lin Yu-chang

Deputy Minister of the Interior
- In office 20 May 2016 – 20 May 2024 Serving with Wu Rong-hui
- Minister: Yeh Jiunn-rong; Hsu Kuo-yung; Himself (acting); Lin Yu-chang
- Preceded by: Chen Chwen-jing

Personal details
- Party: Democratic Progressive Party
- Education: National Chengchi University (BS, MS, PhD)

Hua Ching-chun (Chinese: 花敬群) is a Taiwanese policy analyst who has served as the chairman of National Housing and Urban Regeneration Center since 2018. He was formerly the political deputy minister of the interior from 2016 to 2024, and shortly acted as the 33rd minister from December 2022 to January 2023.

== Education ==
Hua earned a bachelor's degree in geography, a master's degree in land administration, and, in 1999, his Ph.D. in public administration, all from National Chengchi University. His doctoral dissertation, completed under economics professor Chin-Oh Chang, was titled, "The Price-Volume Relationship in the Housing Market" (Chinese: 住宅市場價格與數量之關係).

== Political career ==
Hua was appointed political deputy minister of the interior since 20 May 2016 with the inauguration of the Lin cabinet until the end of Tsai government in 2024.

In August 2018, Hua was appointed acting chairman of the newly established National Housing and Urban Regeneration Center.

In December 2022, then-minister of the interior, Hsu Kuo-yung, resigned as minister due to the health issue. Hua briefly acted as the caretaker minister until the dissolution of the Second Su cabinet in January 2023.

In May 2024, as Hua stepped down from deputy minister, he was formally appointed as the chairman of the National Housing and Urban Regeneration Center in the new cabinet.
