= Lin Yu-chang =

Taiwanese politician

- 林右昌
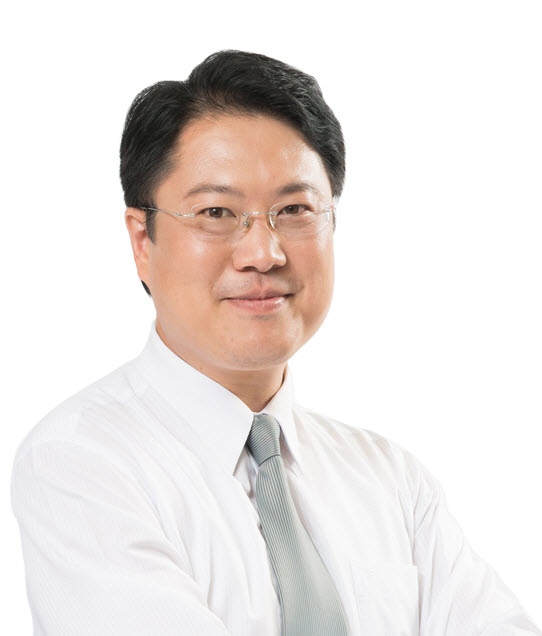
- Official portrait, 2014

25th Secretary-General of the Democratic Progressive Party
- In office 5 June 2024 – 28 July 2025
- Chairman: William Lai
- Preceded by: Yang Yi-shan (acting); Hsu Li-ming
- Succeeded by: Ho Po-wen (acting); Hsu Kuo-yung

34th Minister of the Interior
- In office 31 January 2023 – 20 May 2024
- Prime Minister: Chen Chien-jen
- Deputy: See List: Hua Ching-chun Wu Jong-hui Wu Tang-an
- Preceded by: Hua Ching-chun (acting)
- Succeeded by: Liu Shyh-fang

10th Mayor of Keelung
- In office 25 December 2014 – 25 December 2022
- Deputy: Lin Yong-fa
- Preceded by: Chang Tong-rong
- Succeeded by: George Hsieh

Chair of the Democratic Progressive Party
- Acting; 28 November 2018 – 9 January 2019
- Secretary General: Hsu Chia-ching
- Preceded by: Tsai Ing-wen
- Succeeded by: Cho Jung-tai

Personal details
- Born: 10 March 1971 (age 55) Ren'ai, Keelung, Taiwan
- Party: Democratic Progressive Party
- Education: Chinese Culture University (BS); National Taiwan University (MS)

Lin Yu-chang (Chinese: 林右昌; pinyin: Lín Yòuchāng; born 10 March 1971) is a Taiwanese politician who served as the Secretary-General of the Democratic Progressive Party from June 2024 until his resignation in July 2025. Previously, he served as the Minister of the Interior from January 2023 to May 2024, Mayor of Keelung City from December 2014 to December 2022, and he also shortly served as the acting Chairman of the Democratic Progressive Party from November 2018 to January 2019.

== Education ==
Lin graduated from Chinese Culture University with a bachelor's degree in landscape architecture. He then earned a master's degree in architecture and urban planning from National Taiwan University in 1996. His master's thesis was titled, "Urban development under economic globalization: The case of Singapore" (Chinese: 經濟全球化下的城市發展：新加坡案例分析).

== Mayor of Keelung City ==
=== 2014 Keelung mayoral election ===
Lin was elected as the Mayor of Keelung City after winning the 2014 Keelung City mayoral election held on 29 November 2014.

2014 Keelung City Mayoralty Election Result
No.	Candidate	Party	Votes	Percentage
1	Hsieh Li-kung (謝立功)	KMT	52,198	27.47%
2	Huang Ching-tai (黃景泰)	Independent	30,914	16.27%
3	Lin Yu-chang	DPP	101,010	53.15%
4	Ho Yen-tang (何燕堂)	People's Democratic Front	1,376	0.72%
5	Wu Woo-min (吳武明)	Independent	2,023	1.06%
6	Jiang Jian-yu (江鑒育)	Independent	2,517	1.32%

=== 2018 Keelung mayoral election ===
2018 Democratic Progressive Party Keelung City mayoral primary results
Candidates	Place	Result
Lin Yu-chang	Nominated	Walkover

2018 Keelung City mayoral results
No.	Candidate	Party	Votes	Percentage
1	Hsieh Li-kung (謝立功)	Kuomintang	86,529	45.86%
2	Lin Yu-chang	Democratic Progressive Party	102,167	54.14%
Total voters			309,428	
Valid votes			188,696	
Invalid votes				
Voter turnout			60.98%	

== See also ==
- Mayor of Keelung

Political offices
Preceded by Hua Ching-chun	Minister of Interior; 2023–present	Incumbent
Preceded by Chang Tong-rong	Mayor of Keelung; 2014–2022	Succeeded by Hsieh Kuo-liang
Party political offices
Preceded by Tsai Ing-wen	Chairman of the Democratic Progressive Party; Acting; 2018–2019	Succeeded by Cho Jung-tai
