= National Keelung Maritime Vocational High School =

The Affiliated Keelung Maritime Senior High School of National Taiwan Ocean University 國立臺灣海洋大學附屬基隆海事高級中等學校

Location
- 祥豐街, 246, Keelung; Taiwan
- Coordinates: 25°8′50″N 121°46′19″E

Information
- Website: https://www.klms.ntou.edu.tw/

The Affiliated Keelung Maritime Senior High School of National Taiwan Ocean University (Chinese: 國立臺灣海洋大學附屬基隆海事高級中等學校) is a high school in Keelung, Taiwan, affiliated with National Taiwan Ocean University.

== See also ==
- Education in Taiwan
- National Taiwan Ocean University
