= China University of Science and Technology =

University in Nangang, Taipei, Taiwan

- 中華科技大學
- Motto: 誠實、公正、守法、創新
- Motto in English: Integrity, Justice, Rule of Law, Innovation
- Type: Private university
- Established: 1968
- Location: Nangang, Taipei, Taiwan; 25.0345°N 121.6096°E
- Website: cust.edu.tw

Chinese name
- Simplified Chinese: 中华科技大学
- Traditional Chinese: 中華科技大學
Transcriptions
Standard Mandarin
- Hanyu Pinyin: Zhōnghuá Kējì Dàxué
Southern Min
- Hokkien POJ: Tiong-hôa Kho-ki Tāi-ha̍k

The China University of Science and Technology (CUST; Chinese: 中華科技大學; pinyin: Zhōnghuá Kējì Dàxué) is a private university located in Nangang District, Taipei, Taiwan.

USTC offers a wide range of undergraduate and graduate programs across various disciplines, including science, engineering, management, humanities, and social sciences. It has 15 schools and departments, including the School of Physics, the School of Chemistry and Materials Science, the School of Computer Science and Technology, and the School of Life Sciences.

== History ==
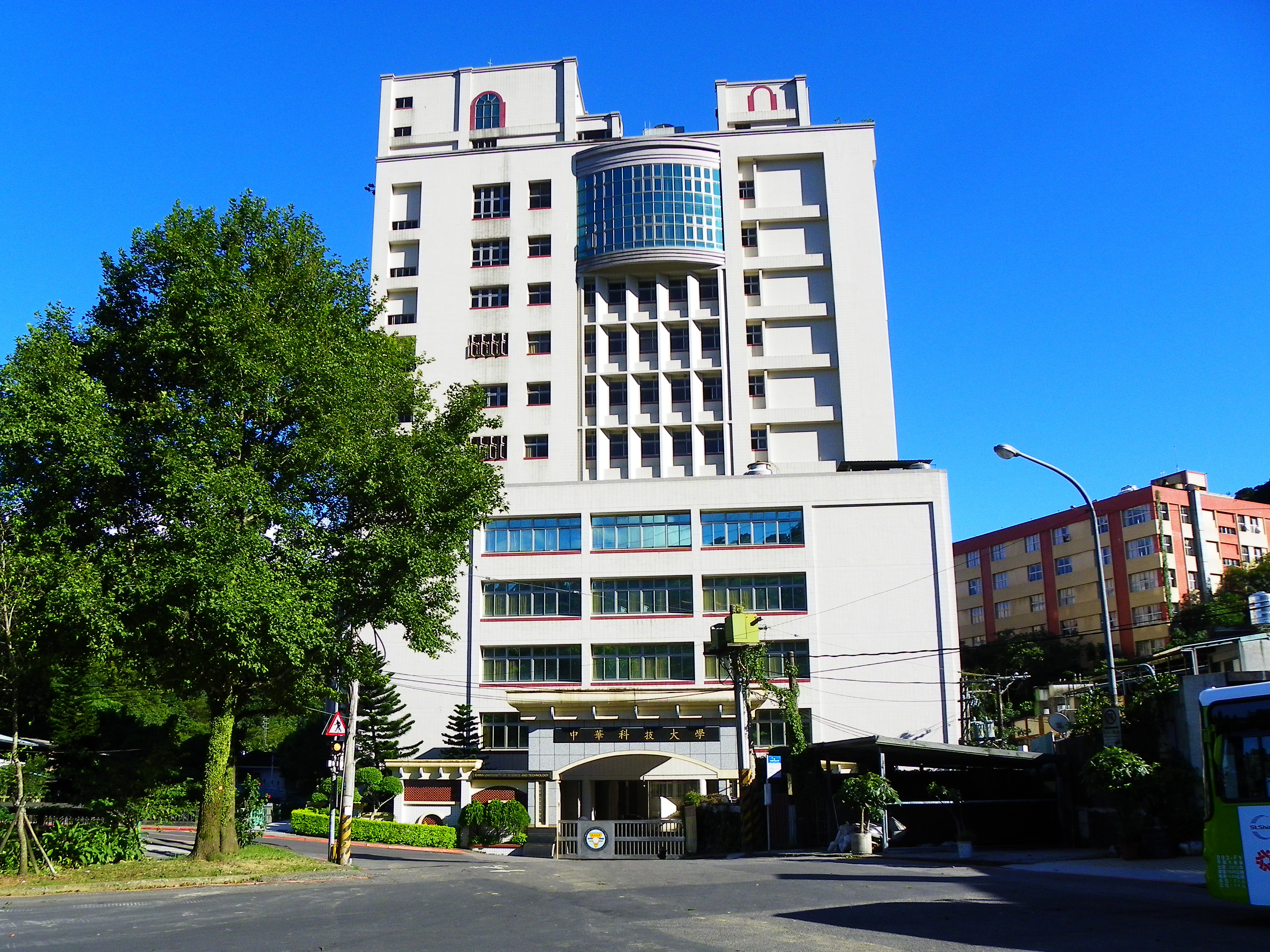

CUST was originally established in 1968 as China Junior College of Technology. In 1994, it was renamed to China Junior College of Technology and Commerce. In 1999, the college was upgraded to China Institute of Technology. In 2009, the institute was finally renamed the China University of Science and Technology.

== Faculties ==
- College of Engineering
- College of Commerce and Management
- College of Health Science and Technology
- College of Aviation

== Notable alumni ==
- Chang Tong-rong, Mayor of Keelung City (2007-2014)
- Lin Ming-chen, Magistrate of Nantou County

== Transportation ==
The university is accessible South of Taipei Nangang Exhibition Center Station of the Taipei Metro.

== See also ==
- List of universities in Taiwan
