= Chang Tong-rong =

Mayor of Keelung City in Taiwan

- 張通榮
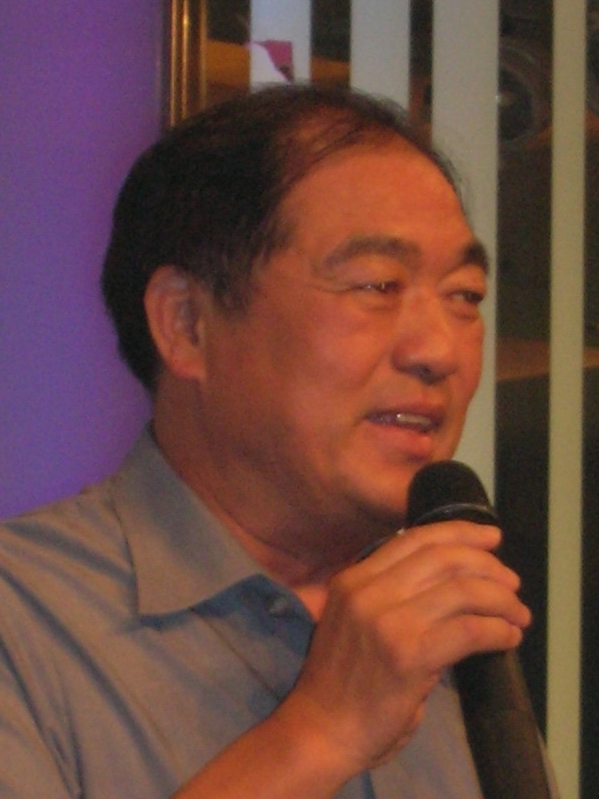

Mayor of Keelung City
- In office 22 May 2007 – 25 December 2014
- Deputy: Ke Shuei-yuan
- Preceded by: Hsu Tsai-li
- Succeeded by: Lin Yu-chang

Personal details
- Born: 4 February 1949 (age 77) Zhongzheng, Keelung, Taiwan
- Party: Kuomintang
- Education: China University of Science and Technology (BS); National Taiwan Ocean University (MS)

Chang Tong-rong (Chinese: 張通榮; pinyin: Zhāng Tōngróng; born 4 February 1949) was the mayor of Keelung City in Taiwan. He previously also served as a legislator in the Legislative Yuan of the Republic of China.

== Education ==
Chang received his bachelor's degree in electrical engineering from China University of Science and Technology and master's degree in shipping and transportation management from National Taiwan Ocean University.

== Keelung City Mayoralty ==
Chang was elected as the Mayor of Keelung City after winning the 2007 Keelung City Mayoralty by-election under Kuomintang on 12 May 2007 and took office on 22 May 2007 due to the death of then-incumbent Mayor Hsu Tsai-li which was elected as mayor since the 2001 Keelung City mayoralty election on 1 December 2001 and took office on 20 December 2001. He was reelected for the second term of mayor after winning the 2009 Keelung City mayoralty election on 5 December 2009 and took office on 20 December 2009.
