= FTV News =

Television channel of Taiwan

- Country: Taiwan
- Broadcast area: Taiwan; Indonesia; Philippines (G Sat)
- Network: Formosa Television

Ownership
- Sister channels: FTV HD, FTV One, FTV Taiwan

History
- Launched: 11 June 1997

Links
- Website: http://ftvnews.com.tw/

Availability

Terrestrial
- Digital: DVB-T

FTV News (Chinese: 民視新聞台; pinyin: Mín shì xīnwén tái) is a digital television news channel operated by Formosa Television (FTV) in Taiwan, launched on 11 June 1997.

== See also ==
- Media of Taiwan
