= Hsu Tsai-li =

Taiwanese politician (1947–2007)

- 許財利
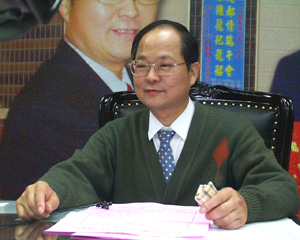

Mayor of Keelung City
- In office 20 December 2001 – 19 February 2007
- Preceded by: Lee Chin-yung
- Succeeded by: Chang Tong-rong

Personal details
- Born: 5 November 1947 Qidu, Keelung, Taiwan
- Died: 19 February 2007 (aged 59) Keelung, Taiwan
- Party: Kuomintang
- Education: National Chung Hsing University (BS); National Taipei University (MPA); Chinese Culture University (MA)

Hsu Tsai-li (Chinese: 許財利; pinyin: Xǔ Cáilì; 5 November 1947 – 19 February 2007) was a Taiwanese politician. He was the Mayor of Keelung City from 2001 to 2007.

== Political career ==
Hsu started his political career as a local borough chief. He served as a councilor at the Keelung City Council in 1982 and became the speaker of the council in 1990, serving for 12 years.

== Keelung City Mayoralty ==
=== 2001 Keelung City mayoralty election ===
Hsu was elected as the Mayor of Keelung City after winning the 2001 Republic of China local election as the Kuomintang candidate on 1 December 2001 and took office on 20 December 2001.

2001 Keelung City Mayoralty Election Result
No.	Candidate	Party	Votes
1	Hsu Tsai-li	KMT	100,070
2	Lee Chin-yung	DPP	72,212

=== Amputation ===
Because of his long-term illness with diabetes mellitus, three toes of his left foot had to be amputated after being infected while he was inspecting a flooded area in Keelung City in 2002.

=== 2005 Keelung City mayor election ===
During his reelection bid for a second term as Keelung City Mayor, Hsu was accused of involvement in a land procurement scandal. However, with support from Kuomintang Chairman Ma Ying-jeou, Hsu easily defeated his opponent. He won the 2005 Republic of China local election on 3 December 2005 and took office on 20 December 2005.

2005 Keelung City Mayoralty Election Results
No.	Candidate	Party	Votes
1	Chen Chien-ming	TSU	58,243
2	Hsu Tsai-li	KMT	76,162
3	Liu Wen-hsiung	PFP	47,932
4	Wang Tuoh	DPP	2,771

=== Corruption scandal ===
In September 2006, Hsu was expelled from the Kuomintang after he was sentenced to seven years in prison by Taiwan Keelung District Court, which found him guilty of corruption for trying to sell a piece of his own land to the bus department of the Keelung City Government at a large profit. However, he retained his mayoralty position. He then protested his innocence and said that he would appeal the ruling, a move which kept him out of prison under the Law of the Republic of China.

== Death ==
Hsu died on 19 February 2007 due to complications from chronic heart disease after suffering from diabetes mellitus for years.
