= National Taiwan Ocean University =

National university in Keelung, Taiwan

Coordinates: 25.150107°N 121.777702°E

- 國立臺灣海洋大學
- Motto: 誠樸博毅; Sêng Phok Phok Gē (Taiwanese Hokkien); Shîn Phok Pok Nyì (Hakka)
- Motto in English: Honesty, Simplicity, Fraternity, Perseverance
- Type: Public
- Established: 1953
- Affiliations: UST
- President: 許泰文 Tai-Wen Hsu
- Academic staff: 531
- Undergraduates: 5,800
- Postgraduates: 2,850
- Other students: 705 (international)
- Location: Zhongzheng, Keelung, Taiwan
- Website: www.ntou.edu.tw

National Taiwan Ocean University
- Traditional Chinese: 國立臺灣海洋大學
- Simplified Chinese: 国立台湾海洋大学
Transcriptions
Standard Mandarin
- Hanyu Pinyin: Guólì Táiwān Hǎiyáng Dàxué
Southern Min
- Hokkien POJ: Kok-li̍p Tâi-oân Hái-iûⁿ Tāi-ha̍k

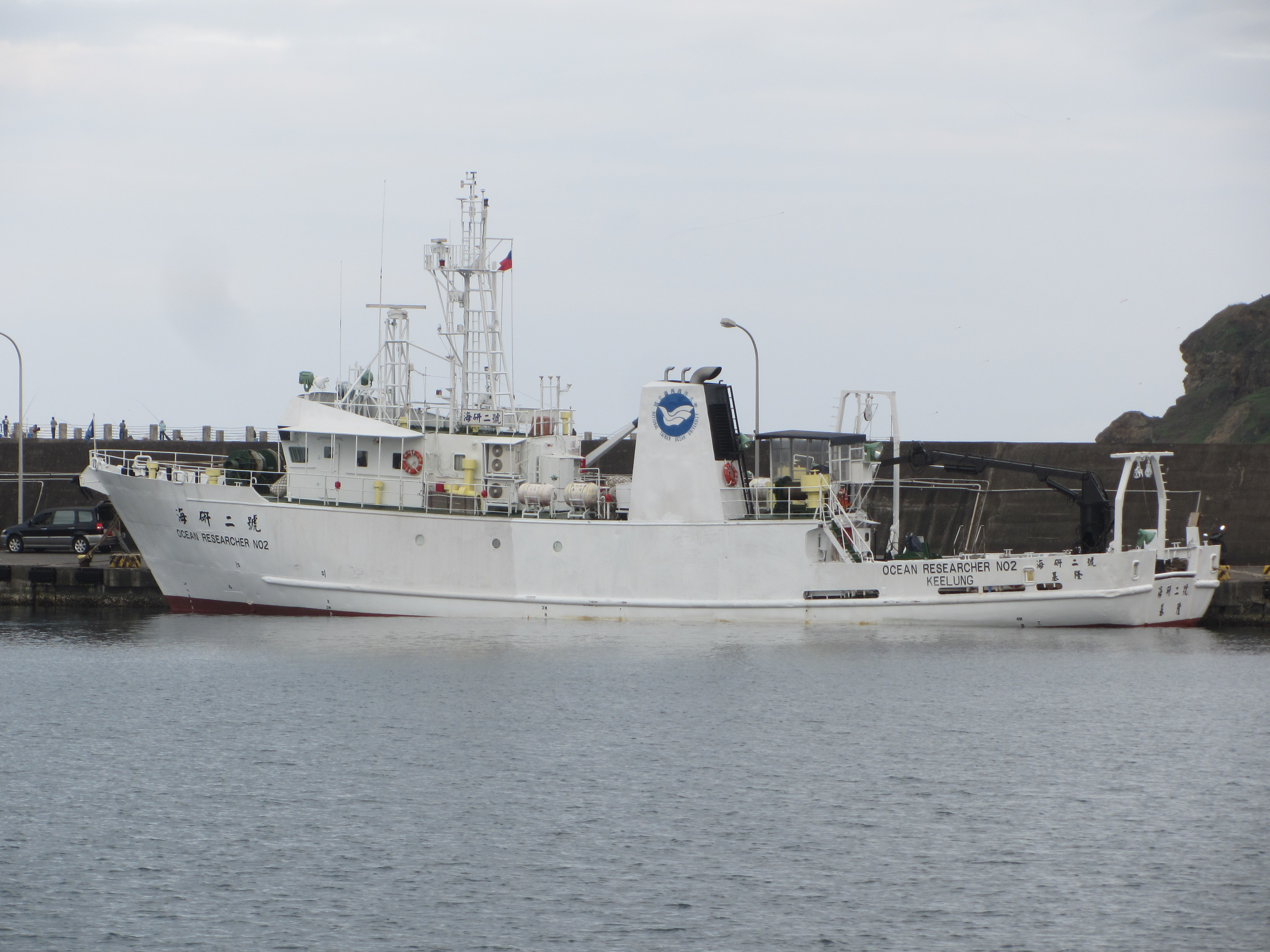
NTOU ocean research ship.

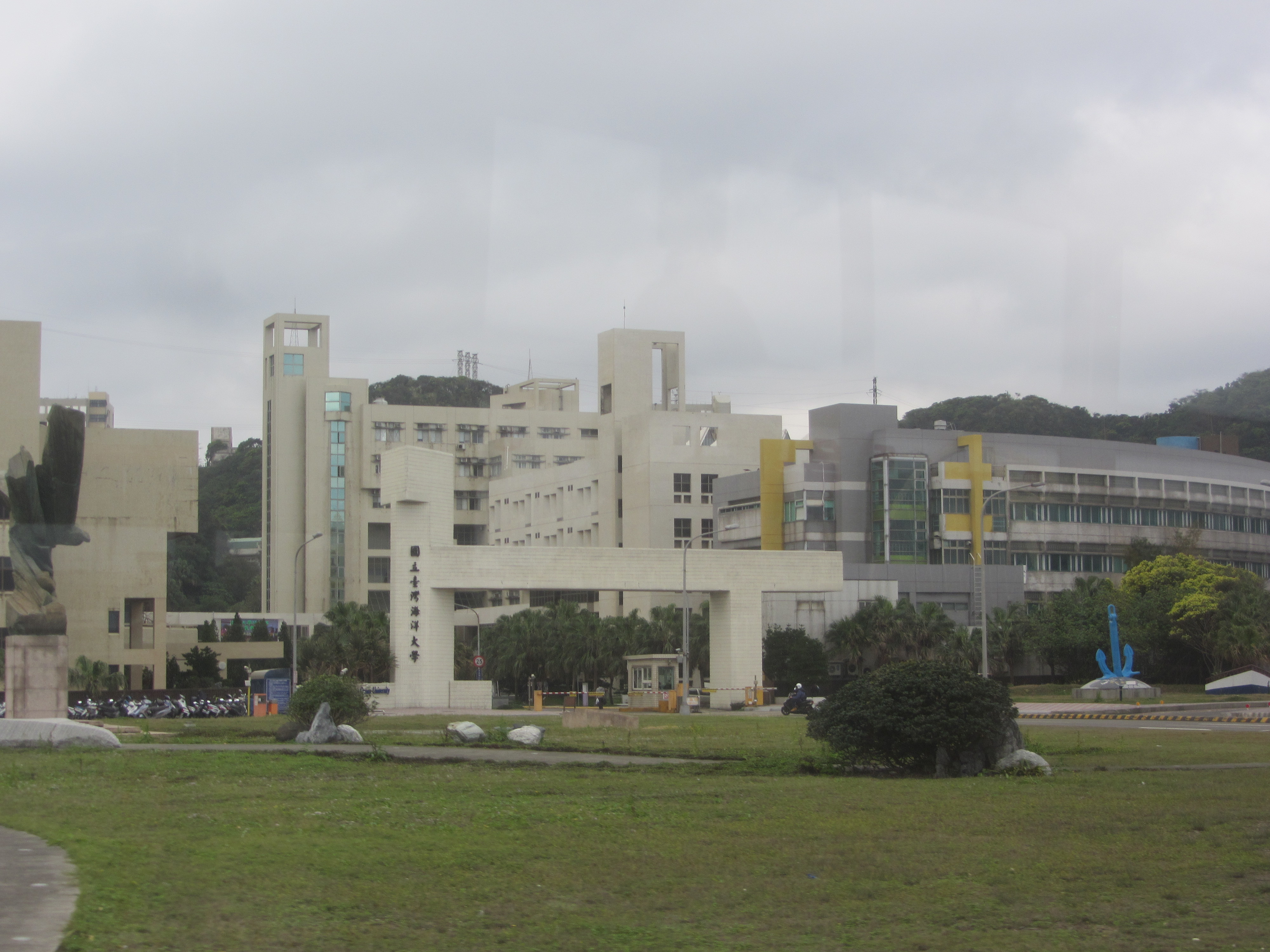
National Taiwan Ocean University

National Taiwan Ocean University (NTOU; Chinese: 國立臺灣海洋大學; Pe̍h-ōe-jī: Kok-li̍p Tâi-oân Hái-iûⁿ Tāi-ha̍k) is a public university in Zhongzheng District, Keelung, Taiwan, dedicated to ocean science.

== History ==
NTOU was originally established as the Provincial Taiwan Maritime Technology College in 1953. In 1979, it was renamed National Taiwan College of Marine Science and Technology. Ten years later, the institution underwent another name change, to National Taiwan Ocean University. A satellite opened on Beigan, Lienchiang in July 2019 as the first university campus on the Matsu Islands.

== Colleges, Departments, and Institutes ==
- College of Maritime Science and Management
  - Department of Merchant Marine
  - Department of Shipping and Transportation Management
  - Department of Transportation Science
  - Department of Marine Engineering
  - Bachelor Degree Program in Ocean Business Management
- College of Life Sciences
  - Department of Food Science
  - Department of Aquaculture
  - Department of Bioscience and Biotechnology
  - Institute of Marine Biology
  - Institute of Food Safety and Risk Management
  - Bachelor Degree Program in Marine Biotechnology
  - Doctoral Degree Program in Marine Biotechnology
- College of Ocean Science and Resource
  - Department of Environmental Biology and Fisheries Science
  - Department of Marine Environmental Informatics
  - Institute of Earth Sciences
  - Institute of Marine Affairs and Resource Management
  - Institute of Marine Environment and Ecology
  - Doctoral Degree Program in Ocean Resource and Environmental Changes
- College of Engineering
  - Department of Mechanical and Mechatronics Engineering
  - Department of Systems Engineering and Naval Architecture
  - Department of Harbor and River Engineering
  - Institute of Materials Engineering
  - Bachelor Degree Program in Ocean Engineering Technology
  - Doctoral Degree Program in Ocean Engineering Technology
- College of Electrical Engineering and Computer Science
  - Department of Electrical and Electronics Engineering
  - Department of Computer Science and Engineering
  - Department of Communications, Navigations, and Control Engineering
  - Department of Optoelectronics and Materials Technology
  - Institute of Optoelectronic Sciences
- College of Humanities and Social Sciences
  - Institute of Applied Economics
  - Institute of Education
  - Institute of Oceanic Culture
  - Institute of Applied English
  - Teacher Education Center
- College of Ocean Law and Policy
  - Bachelor Degree Program in Ocean Law and Policy
  - Institute of the Law of the Sea
  - Master Degree Program in Ocean Policy
- General Education Center
- Center of Excellence for the Oceans
- Taiwan Marine Education Center
- Maritime Development and Training Center

== Ranking ==
National Taiwan Ocean University rankings

Global – Overall
- QS World: 1201–1400 (2025)
- THE World: 1201–1500 (2024)

Regional – Overall
- QS Asia: =350 (2025)
- THE Asia: 351–400 (2023)

National – Overall
- THE National: 21–34 (2024)

The QS World University Rankings ranked the university 350th in Asia in 2025.

== Notable alumni ==
- Chang Tong-rong, Mayor of Keelung City (2007–2014)
- Fan Chen-tsung, Minister of Council of Agriculture (2002)
- Lee I-yang, Minister of the Interior (2006–2008)
- Liu Wen-hsiung, member of Legislative Yuan (1999–2008)
- Lu Tien-lin, Minister of Council of Labor Affairs (2007–2008)
- Wu Nai-ren, Secretary-General of Democratic Progressive Party (2000–2002, 2009, 2010)
- Su Jia-chyuan, politician
- Peter Chou, billionaire

== See also ==
- List of universities in Taiwan
- Maritime industries of Taiwan
- National Keelung Maritime Vocational High School
