= George Hsieh =

Taiwanese politician (born 1975)

Hsieh Kuo-liang
- 謝國樑
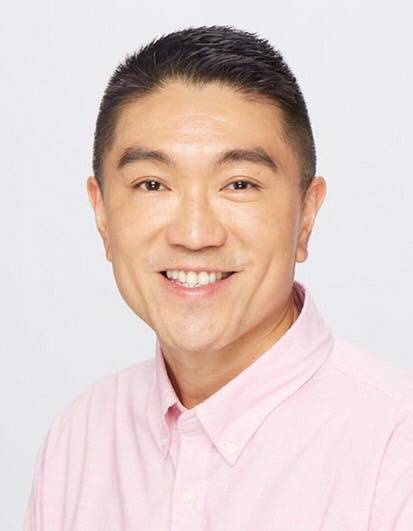
- Official portrait, 2022

11th Mayor of Keelung
- Incumbent
- Assumed office 25 December 2022
- Deputy: Chiu Pei-lin
- Preceded by: Lin Yu-chang

Member of the Legislative Yuan
- In office 1 February 2005 – 1 February 2016
- Succeeded by: Tsai Shih-ying
- Constituency: Keelung

Personal details
- Born: 5 October 1975 (age 50) Keelung, Taiwan
- Party: Kuomintang (since 2006); People First Party (until 2006)
- Education: University of Southern California (BA); Massachusetts Institute of Technology (MS); National Chengchi University (LLM)

George Hsieh
- Traditional Chinese: 謝國樑
- Simplified Chinese: 谢国梁
Transcriptions
Standard Mandarin
- Hanyu Pinyin: Xiè Guóliáng
- Wade–Giles: Hsieh4 Kuo2-liang2

Hsieh Kuo-liang (Chinese: 謝國樑; pinyin: Xiè Guóliáng; born 5 October 1975), also known by his English name George Hsieh, is a Taiwanese politician and media proprietor who has been the 11th mayor of Keelung since 2022. A member of the Kuomintang (KMT), he previously served in the Legislative Yuan from 2005 to 2016.

== Early life and education ==
Hsieh was born in Keelung, Taiwan, on October 5, 1975. His grandfather, Hsieh Ching-yun, was the owner of a prominent Keelung business cooperative, and his father, Hsieh Hsiu-ping, was a KMT legislator in the National Assembly who served as the speaker of the Keelung City Council. His mother, Lin Man-li, was an affiliate of the glass manufacturing company Taiwan Glass Group.

After attending Er-hsin High School, Hsieh graduated from the University of Southern California with a Bachelor of Arts (B.A.) in sociology in 2001. He then studied technology management at the Massachusetts Institute of Technology (MIT) and earned a Master of Science (M.S.) from the MIT Sloan School of Management in 2003. His master's thesis was titled, "VC's Decision Factor in Semiconductor Investment." He later earned a Master of Laws (LL.M.) from National Chengchi University in 2012. His LL.M. dissertation was titled, "A study of an extradition dilemma in the ROC" (引渡困境之檢討).

== Business career ==
After graduating from MIT, Hsieh worked for The China Post and founded Hualien Media International.

== Entry into politics ==
Hsieh renounced his U.S. citizenship to contest the 2004 legislative election as a member of the People First Party. He joined the Kuomintang in 2006, and represented Keelung in the Legislative Yuan until 2016. In 2009, he proposed an amendment to the Computer-Processed Personal Data Protection Act that would make it legal for elected officials to examine personal records without informing the individual subject to investigation. The next year, Hsieh was named the co-chair of the Judiciary and Organic Laws and Statutes Committee. In 2013, Next Magazine reported that he and a small group of legislators had been subject to wiretapping by the Ministry of Justice since 2011. Hsieh was the party's top choice to run for the mayoralty of Keelung City in 2014, after original candidate Huang Ching-tai's nomination had been withdrawn. He repeatedly refused the mayoral nomination and campaigned for Hsieh Li-kung instead. In February 2015, George Hsieh announced that he would not seek reelection, because his party had been soundly defeated in the November 2014 local elections.

== Keelung mayoralty ==
In May 2022, the Kuomintang nominated Hsieh as its candidate for the Keelung mayoralty in the local elections. Hsieh defeated Democratic Progressive Party (DPP) candidate and legislator Tsai Shih-ying.

A CommonWealth Magazine published survey results in September 2023 ranking Hsieh at No. 21 of 22 of major mayors and magistrates in terms of approval ratings. A DPP city councillor attributed Hsieh's low approval ratings to his breaking of campaign promises, including COVID-19 pandemic related subsidies.

In June 2024, a campaign to recall Hsieh garnered 36,000 signatures and exceeded the threshold needed to initiate a recall vote. The campaign organizers submitted the petition with 40,000 signatures on 5 July. The Central Election Commission certified 36,909 of 43,137 submitted signatures in August, and scheduled the recall election for 13 October. The Keelung City Election Commission later announced that 283 polling stations would be set up for the election. With all polling stations reporting, 86,014 voted for Hsieh to remain in office, and 69,934 for his recall. In all seven districts of Keelung, a majority of voters rejected the recall of Hsieh.

== Personal life ==
Hsieh is a Christian. He married Veronica Kuo Chung-wei, a former fashion model, in 2013. She was baptized a Christian in 2022. They have a daughter who was born in 2017 with congenital hearing loss.
