= Anle District =

District of Keelung, Taiwan

Anle 安樂區
- District
- Anle District
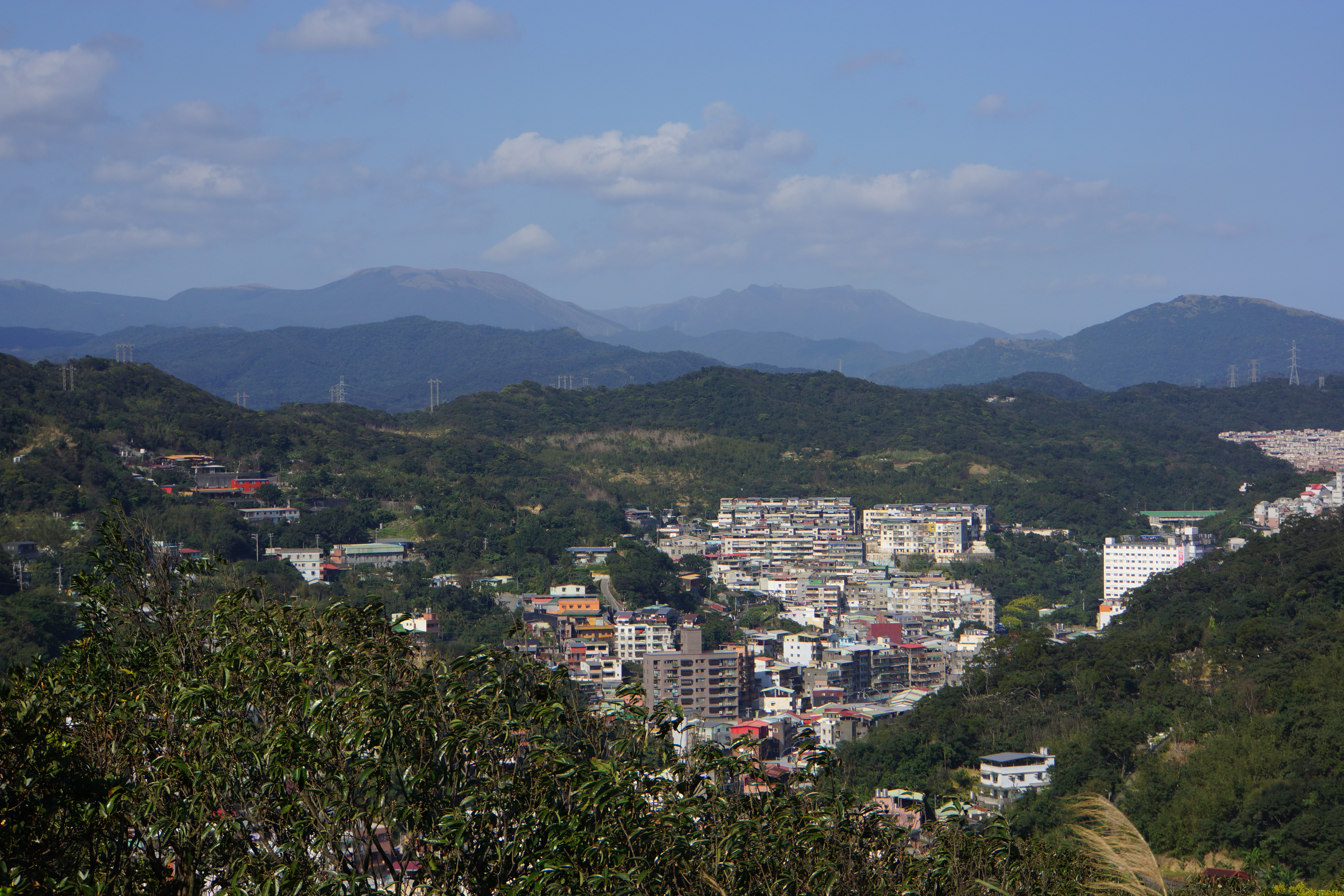

- Location in Taiwan
- Coordinates: 25.151345°N 121.702568°E
- Country: Republic of China
- Province: Taiwan Province (nominal)
- Provincial city: Keelung
- Urban villages: 25

Government
  - Leader (區長): Cheng Chin-Nong (鄭錦濃)

Area
  - Total: 18.0250 km^{2} (6.9595 sq mi)

Population (October 2023)
  - Total: 80,452
  - Density: 4,463.4/km^{2} (11,560/sq mi)
- Time zone: UTC+8 (National Standard Time)
- Postal code: 204
- Website: www.klal.klcg.gov.tw (in Chinese)

Anle District (traditional Chinese: 安樂區; simplified Chinese: 安乐区; pinyin: Ānlè Qū; Pe̍h-ōe-jī: An-lo̍k-khu) is a district of the city of Keelung, Taiwan. With 80,521 inhabitants, it is the largest settlement in Keelung.

== History ==
In March 1988, the Keelung city government reassigned administration of several urban villages between districts. Sih-wha, Sih-rong, Sih-ding, Sih-kong, Deh-ho, Deh-ann, and Chung-ho, originally part of Anle District, became part of Zhongshan District (Chung-shan). Ying-geh, Chi-sien, She-wei, San-min, Wu-fu and Liu-ho, originally part of Qidu District (Chi-du) became part of Anle District.

== Geography ==
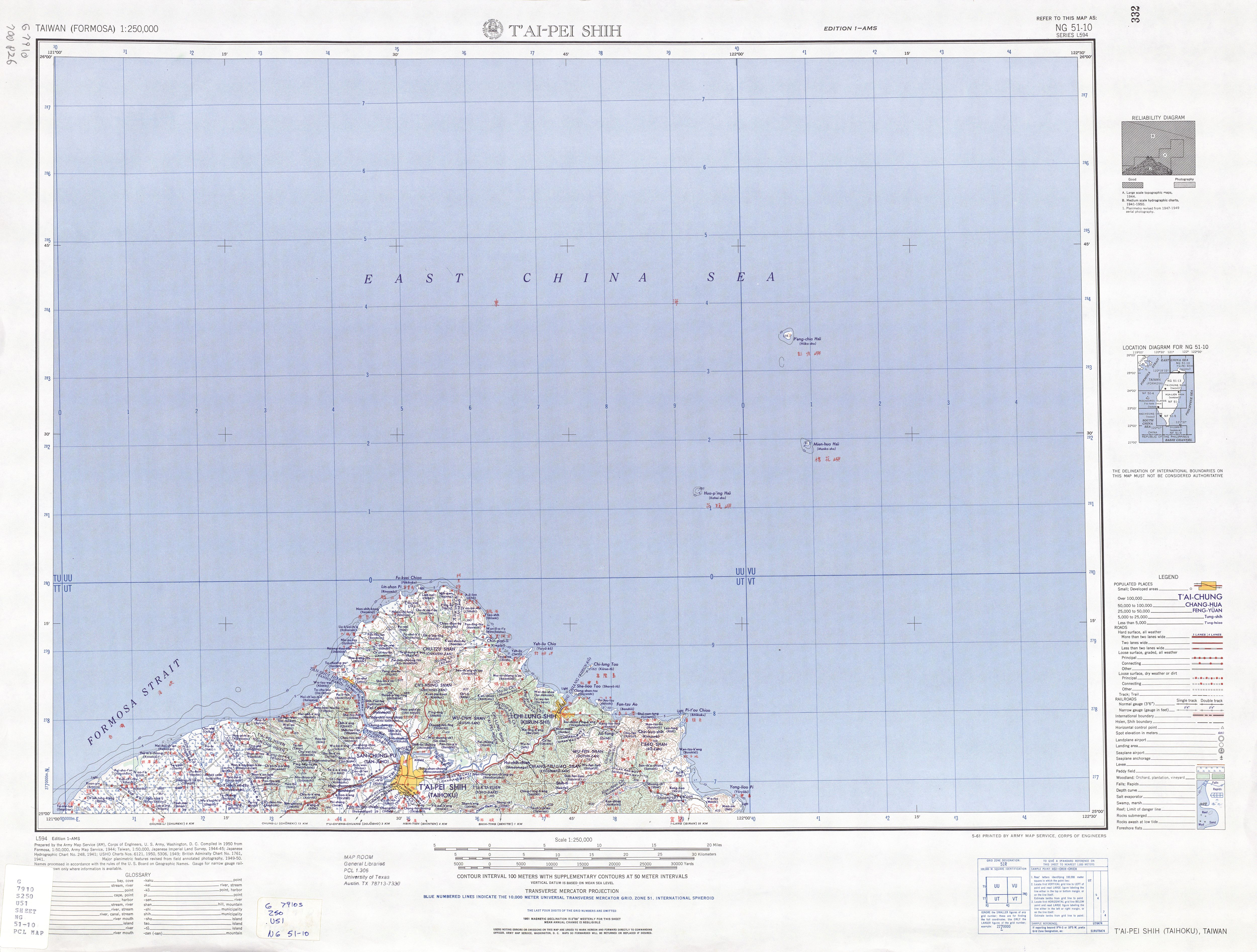
Map including Ying-ko-shih Ch'i (Ōkaseki-kei) (鶯歌石溪) (1950)

- Area: 18.025 km^{2}
- Population: 80,452 (October 2023)

== Administrative divisions ==
Anle District includes 25 urban villages: Siwei/Sihwei (四維里), Qixian/Cisian (七賢里), Jiaren (嘉仁里), Yongkang (永康里), Gancheng (干城里), Xinxi/Sinsi (新西里), Xichuan/Sichuan (西川里), Dingguo (定國里), Dingbang (定邦里), Leyi (樂一里), Anhe (安和里), Ciren/Cihren (慈仁里), Xinlun/Sinlun (新崙里), Neiliao (內寮里), Zhonglun/Jhonglun (中崙里), Wulun (武崙里), Wailiao (外寮里), Xingliao/Singliao (興寮里), Changle (長樂里), Wufu (五福里), Liuhe/Liouhe (六合里), Sanmin (三民里), Ying'an/Ying-an (鶯安里), Yingge (鶯歌里), Zhuangguan (壯觀里).

Formerly: Anguo, Baoding, Daitiansfu, Dawulun, Gangkou, Guanyin, Maijin, Qingrenhu, Siding, Sincheng, Sinhuei, Sinlun, Wuling, Yinggeshi.

== Tourist attractions ==
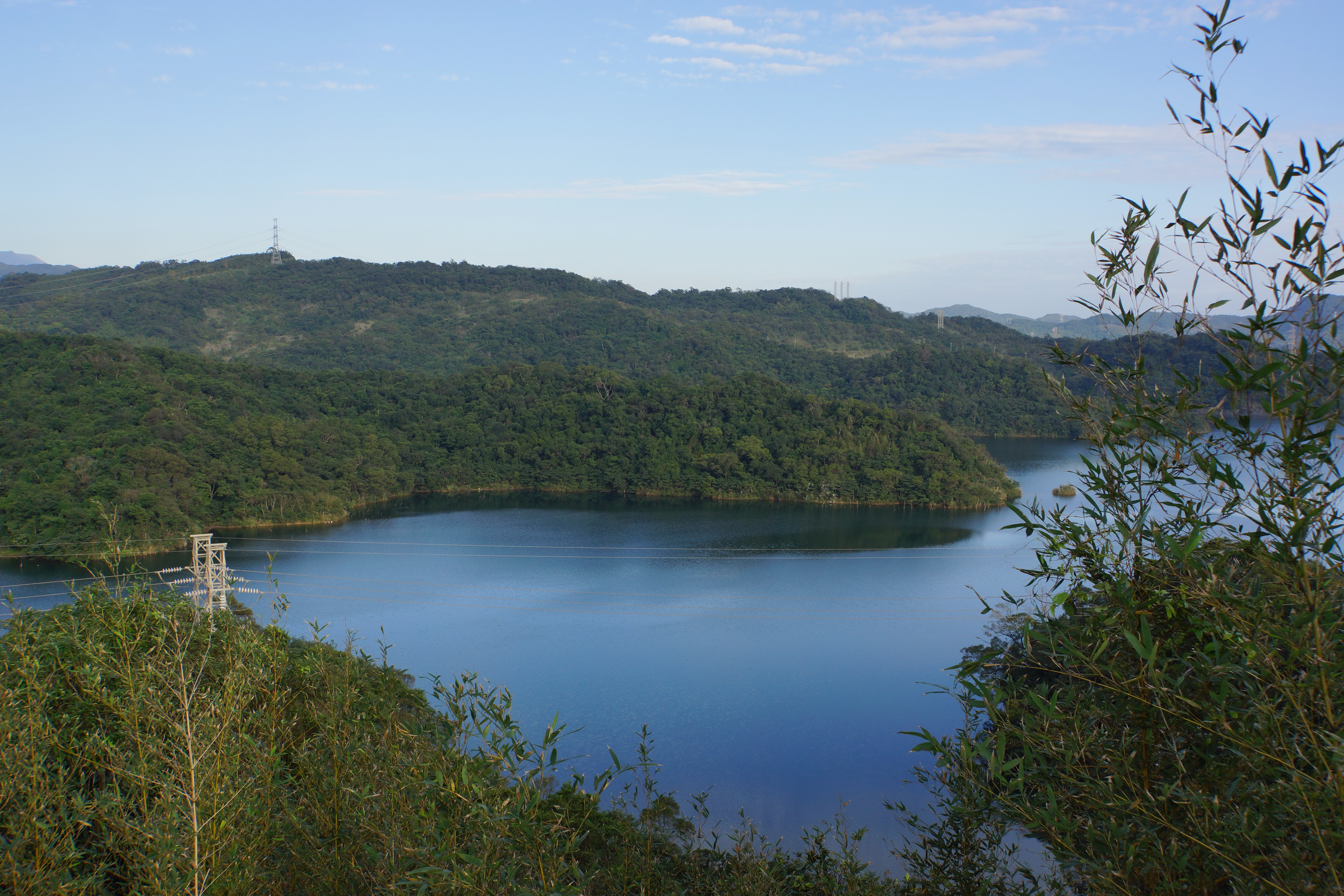
Xinshan Reservoir

- Dawulun Fort
- Xinshan Reservoir
- Au-de Fishing Port
- Lovers Lake
- Shi-fang-da-jyue Temple

== Notable natives ==
- Lu Shiow-yen, Mayor of Taichung

== See also ==
- Keelung
