= Mayor of Keelung =

Chief political executive in Keelung, Taiwan

Mayor of the City of Keelung
- Seal of Keelung City

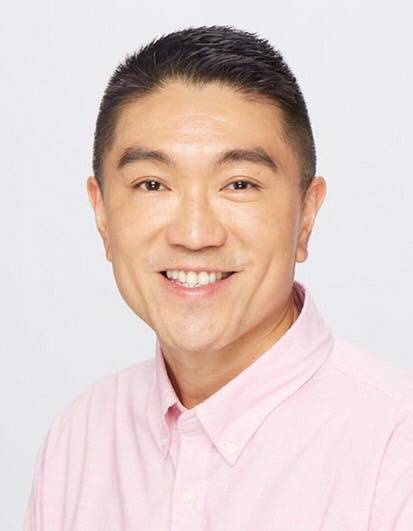
- Incumbent; George Hsieh since 25 December 2022
- Term length: 4 years; may serve 1 consecutive terms
- Inaugural holder: Hsieh Guan-i
- Formation: February 1, 1951
- Website: Office of the Mayor

The Mayor of Keelung is the chief political executive of the city of Keelung in Taiwan. The current mayor is George Hsieh.

== List of mayors ==
Kuomintang (KMT) China Democratic Socialist Party Dem. Progressive Party (DPP) Independent

No.	Portrait	Name (Birth–Death)	Term of office		Political party	Term
1		Hsieh Guan-i 謝貫一; Xiè Guànyī (1902–1967)	1 February 1951	2 June 1954	Kuomintang	1
1		Hsieh Guan-i 謝貫一; Xiè Guànyī (1902–1967)	2 June 1954	2 June 1957	Kuomintang	2
1		Hsieh Guan-i 謝貫一; Xiè Guànyī (1902–1967)	2 June 1957	2 June 1960	Kuomintang	3
2		Lin Fan-wang 林番王; Lín Fānwáng (1899–1965)	2 June 1960	2 June 1964	China Democratic Socialist Party	4
2		Lin Fan-wang 林番王; Lín Fānwáng (1899–1965)	2 June 1964	11 July 1965	China Democratic Socialist Party	5
—		Chiang Chi-wu 江繼五; Jiāng Jìwǔ (?-?)	11 July 1965	21 October 1965	Kuomintang	5
3		Su Te-liang 蘇德良; Sū Déliáng (1916–2006)	21 October 1965	2 June 1968	Kuomintang	5
3		Su Te-liang 蘇德良; Sū Déliáng (1916–2006)	2 June 1968	1 February 1973	Kuomintang	6
4		Chen Cheng-hsiung 陳正雄; Chén Zhèngxióng (1937–2008)	1 February 1973	20 December 1977	Kuomintang	7
4		Chen Cheng-hsiung 陳正雄; Chén Zhèngxióng (1937–2008)	20 December 1977	20 December 1981	Kuomintang	8
5		Chang Chun-hsi 張春熙; Zhāng Chūnxī (1932–2009)	20 December 1981	20 December 1985	Kuomintang	9
5		Chang Chun-hsi 張春熙; Zhāng Chūnxī (1932–2009)	20 December 1985	20 December 1989	Kuomintang	10
6		Lin Shui-mu 林水木; Lín Shuǐmù (1937-)	20 December 1989	20 December 1993	Kuomintang	11
6		Lin Shui-mu 林水木; Lín Shuǐmù (1937-)	20 December 1993	20 December 1997	Kuomintang	12
7		Lee Chin-yung 李進勇; Lĭ Jìnyǒng (1951-)	20 December 1997	20 December 2001	Democratic Progressive Party	13
8		Hsu Tsai-li 許財利; Xǔ Cáilì (1947–2007)	20 December 2001	20 December 2005	Kuomintang	14
8		Hsu Tsai-li 許財利; Xǔ Cáilì (1947–2007)	20 December 2005	19 February 2007	Kuomintang	15
		Hsu Tsai-li 許財利; Xǔ Cáilì (1947–2007)	20 December 2005	19 February 2007	Independent	15
—		Hsu Ching-kun 許清坤; Xŭ Qīngkūn (?-)	19 February 2007	1 March 2007	Independent	15
—		Chen Chong-guan 陳重光; Chén Chóngguāng (1945-)	1 March 2007	22 May 2007	Democratic Progressive Party	15
9		Chang Tong-rong 張通榮; Zhāng Tōngróng (1949-)	22 May 2007	20 December 2009	Kuomintang	15
9		Chang Tong-rong 張通榮; Zhāng Tōngróng (1949-)	20 December 2009	25 December 2014	Kuomintang	16
10		Lin Yu-chang 林右昌; Lín Yòuchāng (1971-)	25 December 2014	25 December 2018	Democratic Progressive Party	17
10		Lin Yu-chang 林右昌; Lín Yòuchāng (1971-)	25 December 2018	25 December 2022	Democratic Progressive Party	18
11		George Hsieh 謝國樑; Xiè Guóliáng (1975-)	25 December 2022	Incumbent	Kuomintang	19

== See also ==
- Keelung
