= 2016 Taiwanese legislative election =

- 16 January 2016

All 113 seats in the Legislative Yuan 57 seats needed for a majority
- Registered: 18,692,217 (Note: District and aboriginal electorate; party-list electorate size was 18,786,940)
- Turnout: 66.34% (▼8.13pp) (Note: District and aboriginal electorate; party-list voter turnout was 66.25%)
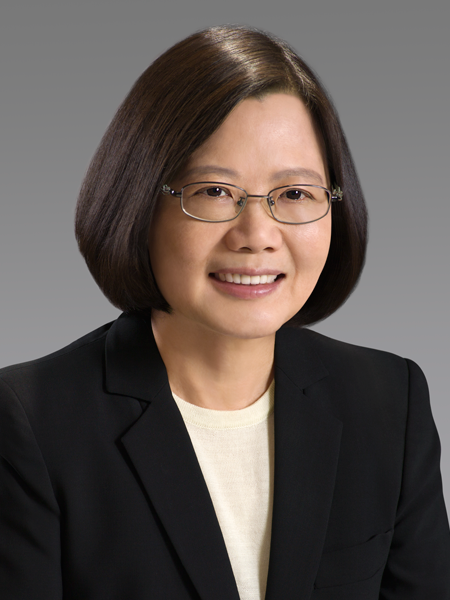

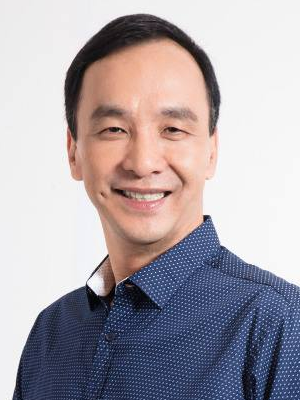

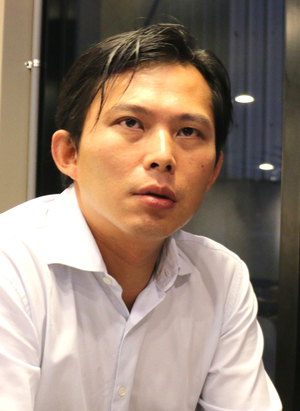

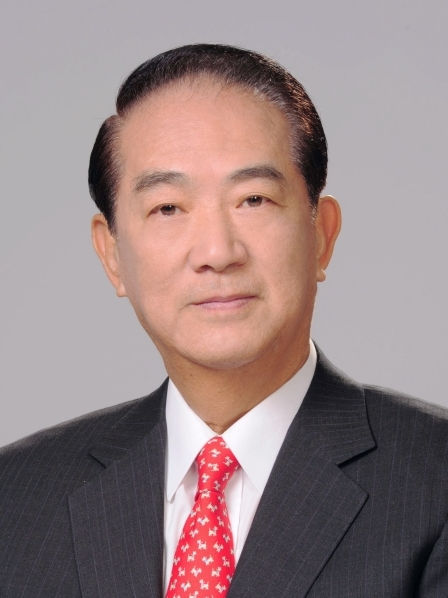
	Majority party	Minority party
Leader	Tsai Ing-wen	Eric Chu
Party	DPP	KMT
Last election	40 seats	65 seats
Seats won	68	35
Seat change	▲28	▼29
Constituency vote	5,416,683; 44.59% ▲0.79pp	4,724,394; 38.89% ▼9.29pp
Party vote	5,370,953; 44.06% ▲9.44pp	3,280,949; 26.91% ▼17.64pp
	Third party	Fourth party
Leader	Huang Kuo-chang	James Soong
Party	NPP	People First
Last election	Did not exist	3 seats
Seats won	5	3
Seat change	New	Steady
Constituency vote	351,244; 2.89% New	156,212; 1.29% ▼0.74pp
Party vote	744,315; 6.11% New	794,383; 6.52% ▲1.03pp

- Election cartogram
President before election
Wang Jin-pyng
Kuomintang
Elected President
Su Jia-chyuan
DPP

Legislative elections were held in Taiwan on 16 January 2016 to elect all 113 members in the Legislative Yuan, alongside presidential elections. The Democratic Progressive Party (DPP) led by Tsai Ing-wen, who also won the presidential election on the same day, secured a majority for the first time in history by winning 68 seats. The ruling Kuomintang (KMT) lost both the presidency and its legislative majority and returned to the opposition.

The DPP managed to unseat the KMT in its traditional blue strongholds across Taiwan, turning districts in Taipei, Taichung and Hualien green, while KMT Vice Chairman Hau Lung-bin conceded defeat to relatively unknown city councilor Tsai Shih-ying from the DPP, becoming one of the most notable upsets in the election. The year-old New Power Party (NPP), founded by young activists in the wake of the 2014 Sunflower Movement, entered the Legislative Yuan, winning five seats from KMT veterans.

== Electoral system ==
Members were elected by parallel voting.

== Contesting parties and candidates ==
The two major parties, the Kuomintang and the Democratic Progressive Party, used different strategies when nominating candidates for the Legislative Yuan elections. The Kuomintang nominated a candidate in all but one of the constituency seats. The sole exception was Taipei 2, where they instead supported the New Party candidate. The DPP, on the other hand, developed a cooperation strategy with several minor parties. The DPP agreed to support candidates from these parties in exchange for agreements not to stand in tight races where they might sap DPP votes. These included the New Power Party, the Taiwan Solidarity Union, and the Green-Social Democratic Coalition, as well as several independents. This strategy did not work in Hsinchu, where the NPP and DPP backed separate candidates. A total of 43 female candidates won election to the Legislative Yuan, the most ever to take office.

Party	General electorates	Aboriginal electorates	Party list	Total
Kuomintang	72	5	33	110
Democratic Progressive Party	60	2	34	96
Unionist Party	14	－	10	24
Minkuotang	13	1	10	24
People First Party	6	1	16	23
Constitutional Conventions of Taiwan	12	－	6	18
New Power Party	12	－	6	18
Free Taiwan Party	11	－	6	17
MCFAP	11	1	5	17
Green-Social Democratic Coalition	11	－	6	17
Taiwan Solidarity Union	2	－	15	17
Faith And Hope League	8	2	6	16
Trees Party	11	－	2	13
National Health Service Alliance	9	1	3	13
Peace Pigeon Union Party	10		3	13
New Party	2	－	10	12
Taiwan Independence Party	9	1	1	11
Non-Partisan Solidarity Union	－	1	7	8
Taiwan Labor Party	5	－	－	5
People's Democratic Front	2	－	－	2
Social Welfare Party	2	－	－	2
Pan-Pacific E.P. Union Party	2	－	－	2
The Motorists' Party of ROC	1	－	－	1
Taiwan Win Party	1	－	－	1
Labor Party	1	－	－	1
Zheng Party	1	－	－	1
Taiwan First Nations Party	1	－	－	1
China Production Party	1	－	－	1
Independents	66	6	－	72
Total	354	23	179	556

== Opinion polls ==
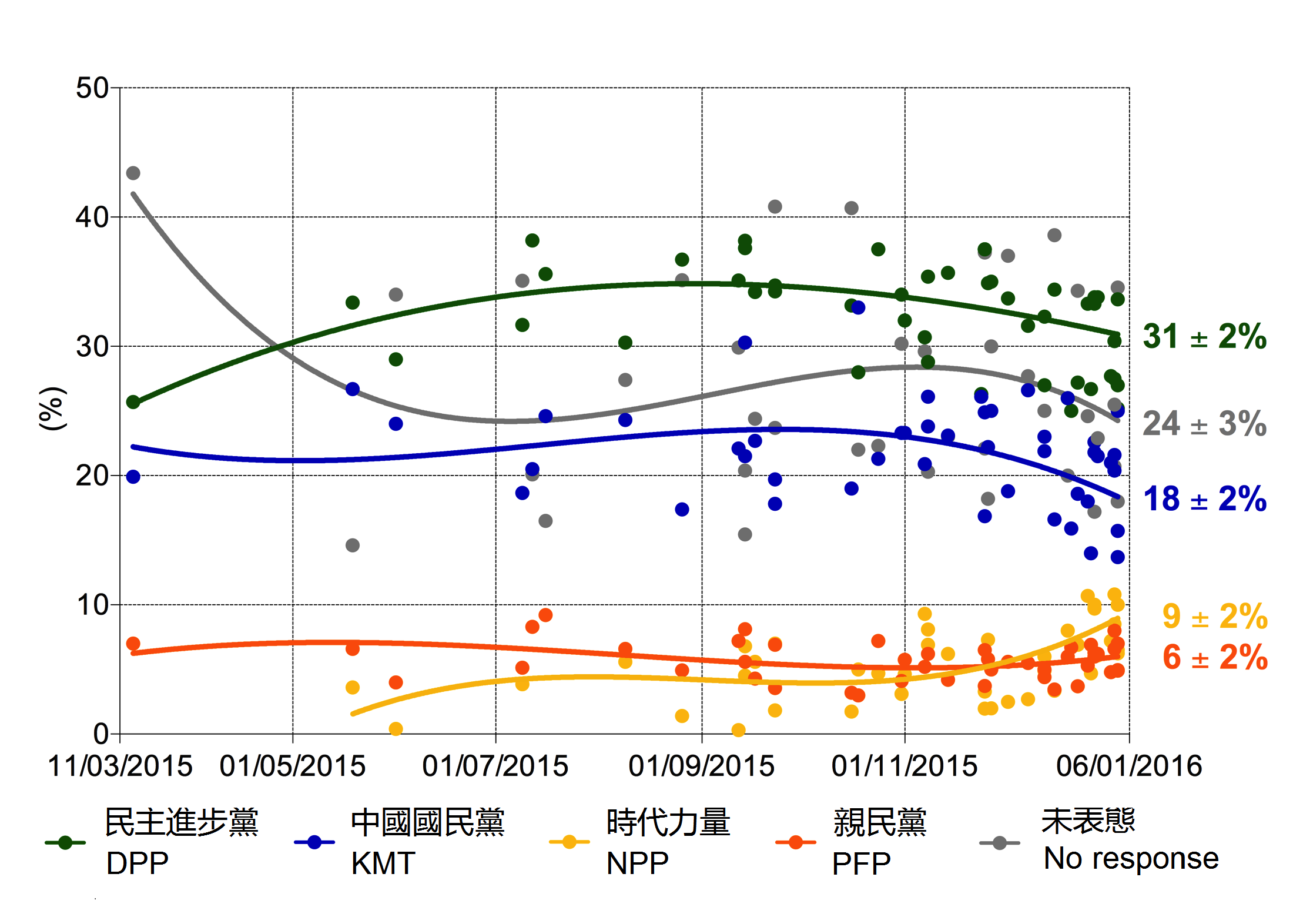
Nationwide polling for the Taiwan legislator-at-large election (party vote) of 2016.

=== Single and multi member districts ===
Source	Date	KMT	DPP	TSU	PFP	MKT	NPP	G–SD	NP	FTP	IND	Other	Undecided	Lead
Trend	9 February 2015	18.5%	31.2%	–	–	–	–	–	–	–	14.5%	1.4%	34.4%	12.7%
Trend	19 May 2015	19.1%	25.2%	2.6%	3.8%	0.4%	3.3%	2.4%	0.9%	–	13.4%	3.6%	25.2%	6.1%
Trend^{1}	12 July 2015	15.5%	30.7%	1.2%	3.4%	–	–	–	0.7%	–	14.0%	–	29.6%	15.2%
Trend^{2}	16 July 2015	20.3%	27.8%	0.6%	4.3%	–	–	–	0.8%	–	12.9%	1.2%	26.9%	7.5%
Trend^{3}	6 August 2015	19.9%	25.9%	0.9%	4.9%	–	–	–	1.2%	–	2.2%	–	36.7%	6.0%
Taiwan index	12 September 2015	21.4%	30.9%	0.1%	2.5%	–	0.7%	0.4%	0.0%	–	–	1.5%	42.3%	9.5%
Apple Daily	14 September 2015	30.29%	38.17%	2.11%	8.12%	1.33%	4.53%	–	–	–	–	15.45%		7.88%
Trend	14 September 2015	15.9%	31.2%	0.4%	2.1%	0.8%	5.9%	1.4%	–	0.5%	11.4%	2.5%	27.9%	15.3%
Trend	17 September 2015	18.3%	29.9%	1.2%	2.4%	0.5%	5.9%	1.5%	0.1%	0.3%	3.7%	1.1%	35.2%	11.6%
Trend	24 September 2015	18.3%	32.6%	1.6%	5.2%	0.5%	5.6%	2.0%	0.6%	–	0.4%	2.7%	30.5%	14.3%
Daily	16 October 2015	31.28%	38.11%	1.93%	4.75%	1.33%	5.94%	1.04%	1.49%	–	–	–	13.68%	6.83%
TVBS	19 October 2015	30%	30%	–	1%	–	1%	–	–	–	2%	1%	35%	Tied
Trend	24 October 2015	19.0%	35.0%	1.0%	2.4%	0.8%	4.0%	0.9%	0.1%	0.1%	2.0%	0.3%	34.4%	16.0%
Notice： Third party (politics)：^{1}4.5%, ^{2}5.2%, ^{3}8.1%.

=== Proportional representation ===
Source	Date	KMT	DPP	TSU	PFP	MKT	NPP	G–SD	NP*	FTP	Other	Undecided	Lead
Trend	14 March 2015	19.9%	25.7%	4.0%	7.0%	–	–	–	–	–	–	43.4%	5.8%
Trend	19 May 2015	26.7%	33.4%	4.4%	6.6%	0.4%	3.6%	4.2%	1.5%	–	4.6%	14.6%	6.7%
TVBS^{1}	1 June 2015	24%	29%	3%	4%	0.8%	0.4%	1.1%	0.8%	–	2%	34%	5.0%
New Realm	9 July 2015	18.67%	31.67%	1.61%	5.14%	–	3.86%	1.12%	1.29%	–	1.08%	35.08%	13.00%
Trend^{2}	12 July 2015	20.5%	38.2%	3.7%	8.3%	–	–	–	0.9%	–	–	20.1%	13.7%
Trend^{3}	16 July 2015	24.6%	35.6%	4.1%	9.2%	–	–	–	2.1%	–	0.4%	16.5%	11.0%
Decision	9 August 2015	24.3%	30.3%	1.8%	6.6%	–	5.6%	2.6%	1.4%	–	–	27.4%	6.0%
Freedom Journal	26 August 2015	17.38%	36.71%	1.39%	4.93%	0.28%	1.3%	0.46%	–	–	2.42%	35.13%	19.33%
Taiwan Index	12 September 2015	22.1%	35.1%	1.9%	7.2%	0.0%	0.3%	1.4%	0.1%	–	2.1%	29.9%	13.0%
Trend	14 September 2015	21.5%	37.6%	4.1%	5.6%	0.8%	6.8%	1.8%	–	0.5%	0.9%	20.4%	16.0%
Trend	17 September 2015	22.7%	34.2%	3.7%	4.3%	0.7%	5.6%	2.3%	–	1.6%	0.5%	24.4%	11.5%
Freedom journal	23 September 2015	17.81%	34.26%	1.54%	3.56%	–	1.83%	0.19%	–	–	40.82%		16.45%
Trend	23 September 2015	19.7%	34.7%	3.4%	6.9%	0.5%	7.0%	1.7%	–	–	2.4%	23.7%	15.0%
Freedom Journal	16 October 2015	19.01%	33.17%	1.65%	3.2%	0.39%	1.75%	0.10%	–	–	–	40.71%	14.16%
TVBS	18 October 2015	33%	28%	3%	3%	2%	5%	2%	–	–	2%	22%	5.0%
Trend	24 October 2015	21.3%	37.5%	3.0%	7.2%	0.6%	4.7%	2.4%	0.2%	0.5%	0.3%	22.3%	16.2%
Shih Hsin University^{4}	31 October 2015	23.3%	34%	2.3%	4.1%	0.5%	3.1%	–	0.7%	–	–	30.2%	11.7%
TVBS	13 December 2015	23%	27%	2%	5%	2%	6%	3%	–	–	3%	25%	4%
Notice:：: New Party (Taiwan)：[*] New Party decided to fully support Kuomintang and withdrew all their candidates on proportional representation, but eventually still announced their own proportional candidates in November.; Home Party：^{1}0.5%; Non-Partisan Solidarity Union：^{4}1.8%; Third party (politics)：^{2}8.3%,^{3}7.5%.

== Results ==
Party	Party-list				Constituency/Aboriginal				Total seats	+/–
Party	Votes	%	+/–	Seats	Votes	%	+/–	Seats	Total seats	+/–
Democratic Progressive Party	5,370,953	44.06	+9.44	18	5,416,683	44.59	+0.79	50	68	+28
Kuomintang	3,280,949	26.91	–17.64	11	4,724,394	38.89	–9.29	24	35	–29
People First Party	794,838	6.52	+1.03	3	156,212	1.29	–0.04	0	3	0
New Power Party	744,315	6.11	New	2	351,244	2.89	New	3	5	New
New Party	510,074	4.18	+2.69	0	75,372	0.62	+0.54	0	0	0
Green–Social Democratic Coalition	308,106	2.53	+0.79	0	203,658	1.68	+1.07	0	0	0
Taiwan Solidarity Union	305,675	2.51	–6.45	0	97,765	0.80	New	0	0	–3
Faith And Hope League	206,629	1.70	New	0	71,101	0.59	New	0	0	New
Minkuotang	197,627	1.62	New	0	195,140	1.61	New	0	0	New
Military, Civil and Faculty Alliance Party	87,213	0.72	New	0	17,718	0.15	New	0	0	New
Non-Partisan Solidarity Union	77,672	0.64	New	0	27,690	0.23	–1.05	1	1	–1
Trees Party	77,174	0.63	New	0	30,224	0.25	New	0	0	New
Chinese Unification Promotion Party	56,347	0.46	New	0	18,812	0.15	New	0	0	New
National Health Service Alliance	51,024	0.42	–0.82	0	12,429	0.10	–0.05	0	0	0
Free Taiwan Party	47,988	0.39	New	0	18,495	0.15	New	0	0	New
Peace Dove Alliance Party	30,617	0.25	New	0	10,318	0.08	New	0	0	New
Taiwan Independence Party	27,496	0.23	New	0	7,809	0.06	New	0	0	New
Constitutional Conventions of Taiwan	15,442	0.13	New	0	13,518	0.11	New	0	0	New
People's Democratic Front					7,403	0.06	New	0	0	New
Taiwan Labor Party					6,098	0.05	New	0	0	New
Labor Party					5,773	0.05	New	0	0	New
The Motorists' Party of ROC					3,040	0.03	New	0	0	New
Social Welfare Party					2,751	0.02	New	0	0	New
Taiwan Win Party					2,700	0.02	New	0	0	New
Pan-Pacific E.P. Union Party					1,946	0.02	New	0	0	New
Righteous Party					847	0.01	–0.00	0	0	0
Taiwan First Party					567	0.00	New	0	0	New
Chinese Production Party					568	0.00	New	0	0	New
Independents					668,446	5.50	+1.45	1	1	0
Total	12,190,139	100.00	–	34	12,148,721	100.00	–	79	113	0
Valid votes	12,190,139	97.94			12,148,721	97.97				
Invalid/blank votes	256,897	2.06			251,308	2.03				
Total votes	12,447,036	100.00			12,400,029	100.00				
Registered voters/turnout	18,786,940	66.25			18,692,217	66.34				
Source: CEC, Election Study Center, Election Study Center

=== By constituency ===
Constituency		Incumbent	Candidates		Results
Constituency		Incumbent	Winner	First runner-up	Results
New Taipei City	I	Wu Yu-sheng (KMT)	Lu Sun-ling (DPP) 53.28%	Wu Yu-sheng (KMT) 40.88%	DPP gain.
New Taipei City	II	Lin Shu-fen (DPP)	Lin Shu-fen (DPP) 68.75%	Chen Ming-yi (KMT) 31.25%	Incumbent re-elected.
New Taipei City	III	Gao Jyh-peng (DPP)	Gao Jyh-peng (DPP) 54.54%	Lee Chien-lung (KMT) 35.43%	Incumbent re-elected.
New Taipei City	IV	Lee Hung-chun (KMT)	Wu Ping-jui (DPP) 62.99%	Lee Hung-chun (KMT) 29.40%	DPP gain.
New Taipei City	V	Huang Chih-hsiung (KMT)	Su Chiao-hui (DPP) 56.11%	Huang Chih-hsiung (KMT) 40.77%	DPP gain.
New Taipei City	VI	Lin Hung-chih (KMT)	Chang Hung-lu (DPP) 52.61%	Lin Kuo-chun (KMT) 39.55%	DPP gain.
New Taipei City	VII	Chiang Huei-chen (KMT)	Lo Chih-cheng (DPP) 53.61%	Chiang Huei-chen (KMT) 39.84%	DPP gain.
New Taipei City	VIII	Chang Ching-chung (KMT)	Chiang Yung-chang (DPP) 53.67%	Chang Ching-chung (KMT) 40.43%	DPP gain.
New Taipei City	IX	Lin Te-fu (KMT)	Lin Te-fu (KMT) 52.44%	Lee Hsin-chang (Nonpartisan) 29.57%	Incumbent re-elected.
New Taipei City	X	Lu Chia-chen (KMT)	Wu Chi-ming (DPP) 58.50%	Lu Chia-chen (KMT) 38.46%	DPP gain.
New Taipei City	XI	Lo Ming-tsai (KMT)	Lo Ming-tsai (KMT) 51.00%	Chen Yung-fu (DPP) 51.00%	Incumbent re-elected.
New Taipei City	XII	Lee Ching-hua (KMT)	Huang Kuo-chang (NPP) 51.52%	Lee Ching-hua (KMT) 43.72%	NPP gain.
Taipei City	I	Ting Shou-chung (KMT)	Rosalia Wu (DPP) 50.82%	Ting Shou-chung (KMT) 43.77%	DPP gain.
Taipei City	II	Pasuya Yao (DPP)	Pasuya Yao (DPP) 59.29%	Wynn H.T. Pan (NP) 36.43%	Incumbent re-elected.
Taipei City	III	Lo Shu-lei (KMT)	Chiang Wan-an (KMT) 46.68%	Billy Pan (Nonpartisan) 38.42%	KMT hold.
Taipei City	IV	Tsai Cheng-yuan (KMT)	Lee Yen-hsiu (KMT) 41.74%	Huang Shan-shan (PFP) 38.42%	KMT hold.
Taipei City	V	Lin Yu-fang (KMT)	Freddy Lim (NPP) 49.52%	Lin Yu-fang (KMT) 45.58%	NPP gain.
Taipei City	VI	Chiang Nai-shin (KMT)	Chiang Nai-shin (KMT) 46.10%	Fan Yun (Green & SD) 35.36%	Incumbent re-elected.
Taipei City	VII	Fai Hrong-tai (KMT)	Fai Hrong-tai (KMT) 45.05%	Yang Shih-chiu (Nonpartisan) 42.28%	Incumbent re-elected.
Taipei City	VIII	Lai Shyh-bao (KMT)	Lai Shyh-bao (KMT) 45.05%	Lee Ching-yuan (Nonpartisan) 42.28%	Incumbent re-elected.
Taoyuan City	I	Chen Ken-te (KMT)	Cheng Yun-peng (DPP) 47.25%	Chen Ken-te (KMT) 44.06%	DPP gain.
Taoyuan City	II	Liao Cheng-ching (KMT)	Chen Lai Su-mei (DPP) 50.17%	Liao Cheng-ching (KMT) 44.06%	DPP gain.
Taoyuan City	III	Chen Shei-saint (KMT)	Chen Shei-saint (KMT) 44.71%	Hsu Ching-wen (DPP) 44.49%	Incumbent re-elected.
Taoyuan City	IV	Yang Li-huan (KMT)	Cheng Pao-ching (DPP) 50.05%	Yang Li-huan (KMT) 49.95%	DPP gain.
Taoyuan City	V	Lu Yu-ling (KMT)	Lu Yu-ling (KMT) 43.86%	Chao Liang-chang (DPP) 42.20%	Incumbent re-elected.
Taoyuan City	VI	Sun Ta-chien (KMT)	Chao Cheng-yu (Nonpartisan) 46.53%	Sun Ta-chien (KMT) 46.06%	Nonpartisan gain.
Taichung City	I	Tsai Chi-chang (DPP)	Tsai Chi-chang (DPP) 60.14%	Yen chiou-yue (KMT) 37.99%	Incumbent re-elected.
Taichung City	II	Yen Chin-piao (KMT)	Yen Chin-piao (KMT) 46.65%	Chen Shih-kai (DPP) 37.99%	Incumbent re-elected.
Taichung City	III	Yang Chiung-ying (KMT)	Hung Tzu-yung (NPP) 53.87%	Yang Chiung-ying (KMT) 45.16%	NPP gain.
Taichung City	IV	Tsai Chin-lung (KMT)	Chang Liao Wan-chien (DPP) 52.77%	Tsai Chin-lung (KMT) 36.77%	DPP gain.
Taichung City	V	Lu Shiow-yen (KMT)	Lu Shiow-yen (KMT) 51.52%	Liu Kuo-lung (TSU) 39.96%	Incumbent re-elected.
Taichung City	VI	Lin Chia-lung (DPP)	Huang Kuo-shu (DPP) 55.74%	Shen Chih-hwei (KMT) 40.53%	DPP hold.
Taichung City	VII	Ho Hsin-chun (DPP)	Ho Hsin-chun (DPP) 63.07%	Lai Yi-huang (KMT) 35.05%	Incumbent re-elected.
Taichung City	VIII	Johnny Chiang (KMT)	Johnny Chiang (KMT) 49.62%	Hsieh Chih-chung (DPP) 48.60%	Incumbent re-elected.
Tainan City	I	Yeh Yi-jin (DPP)	Yeh Yi-jin (DPP) 71.22%	Huang Rui-kun (KMT) 22.17%	Incumbent re-elected.
Tainan City	II	Huang Wei-cher (DPP)	Huang Wei-cher (DPP) 76.47%	Huang Yao-sheng (KMT) 18.67%	Incumbent re-elected.
Tainan City	III	Chen Ting-fei (DPP)	Chen Ting-fei (DPP) 71.38%	Xie Long-jie (KMT) 25.73%	Incumbent re-elected.
Tainan City	IV	Hsu Tain-tsair (DPP)	Lin Jun-xian (DPP) 58.90%	Chen Shu-hui (KMT) 32.46%	DPP hold.
Tainan City	V	Mark Chen Tan-sun (DPP)	Wang Ting-yu (DPP) 72.05%	Lin Yi-huang (KMT) 24.28%	DPP hold.
Kaohsiung City	I	Chiu Yi-ying (DPP)	Chiu Yi-ying (DPP) 59.02%	Chung Yi-chung (KMT) 39.62%	Incumbent re-elected.
Kaohsiung City	II	Chiu Chih-wei (DPP)	Chiu Chih-wei (DPP) 63.24%	Huang Yun-han (KMT) 34.91%	Incumbent re-elected.
Kaohsiung City	III	Huang Chao-shun (KMT)	Liu Shyh-fang (DPP) 53.51%	Chang Hsien-yao (KMT) 38.61%	DPP gain.
Kaohsiung City	IV	Lin Tai-hua (DPP)	Lin Tai-hua (DPP) 75.53%	Lucas Kuo (KMT) 23.21%	Incumbent re-elected.
Kaohsiung City	V	Kuan Bi-ling (DPP)	Kuan Bi-ling (DPP) 59.44%	Tsai Chin-yen (KMT) 38.60%	Incumbent re-elected.
Kaohsiung City	VI	Lee Kun-tse (DPP)	Lee Kun-tse (DPP) 58.94%	Huang Po-lin (KMT) 39.78%	Incumbent re-elected.
Kaohsiung City	VII	Chao Tien-lin (DPP)	Chao Tien-lin (DPP) 60.50%	Zhuang Qi-wang (KMT) 34.08%	Incumbent re-elected.
Kaohsiung City	VIII	Hsu Chih-chieh (DPP)	Hsu Chih-chieh (DPP) 59.13%	Huang Hsi-wen (KMT) 31.62%	Incumbent re-elected.
Kaohsiung City	IX	Lin Kuo-cheng (KMT)	Lai Jui-lung (DPP) 60.57%	Lin Kuo-cheng (KMT) 34.44%	DPP gain.
Yilan County		Chen Ou-po (DPP)	Chen Ou-po (DPP) 53.68%	Lee Chih-yung (KMT) 28.25%	Incumbent re-elected.
Hsinchu County		Hsu Hsin-ying (KMT)	Lin Wei-chou (KMT) 36.75%	Cheng Yung-chin (Non) 33.48%	KMT hold.
Miaoli County	I	Chen Chao-ming (KMT)	Chen Chao-ming (KMT) 42.26%	Tu Wen-ching (DPP) 33.48%	Incumbent re-elected.
Miaoli County	II	Hsu Yao-chang (KMT)	Hsu Chih-jung (KMT) 49.90%	Wu Yi-chen (DPP) 44.61%	KMT hold.
Changhua County	I	Wang Huei-mei (KMT)	Wang Huei-mei (KMT) 56.20%	Chen Wen-pin (DPP) 43.80%	Incumbent re-elected.
Changhua County	II	Lin Tsang-min (KMT)	Huang Hsiu-fang (DPP) 45.07%	Lin Tsang-min (KMT) 40.02%	DPP gain.
Changhua County	III	Cheng Ru-fen (KMT)	Hung Chun-yi (DPP) 44.58%	Cheng Ru-fen (KMT) 40.95%	DPP gain.
Changhua County	IV	Wei Ming-ku (DPP)	Chen Su-yueh (DPP) 57.24%	Chang Chin-kun (KMT) 42.76%	DPP hold.
Nantou County	I	Ma Wen-chun (KMT)	Ma Wen-chun (KMT) 54.77%	Kuor Hsin-chang (DPP) 45.23%	Incumbent re-elected.
Nantou County	II	Lin Ming-chen (KMT)	Hsu Shu-hua (KMT) 56.65%	Tsai Huang-liang (DPP) 43.35%	KMT hold.
Yunlin County	I	Chang Chia-chun (KMT)	Su Chin-feng (DPP) 53.73%	Chang Jung-chi (KMT) 42.80%	DPP gain.
Yunlin County	II	Liu Chien-kuo (DPP)	Liu Chien-kuo (DPP) 68.17%	Wu Wei-chih (KMT) 26.17%	Incumbent re-elected.
Chiayi County	I	Wong Chung-chun (KMT)	Tsai Yi-yu (DPP) 52.96%	Lin Chiang-chuan (KMT) 45.44%	DPP gain.
Chiayi County	II	Chen Ming-wen (DPP)	Chen Ming-wen (DPP) 65.18%	Lin Yu-ling (KMT) 31.86%	Incumbent re-elected.
Pingtung County	I	Su Chen-ching (DPP)	Su Chen-ching (DPP) 70.00%	Liao Wan-ju (KMT) 30.00%	Incumbent re-elected.
Pingtung County	II	Wang Chin-shih (KMT)	Chung Chia-pin (DPP) 52.55%	Wang Chin-shih (KMT) 47.45%	DPP gain.
Pingtung County	III	Pan Men-an (DPP)	Chuang Jui-hsiung (DPP) 53.53%	Huang Chao-chang (Non) 47.45%	DPP hold.
Hualien County		Wang Ting-son (KMT)	Hsiao Bi-khim (DPP) 53.77%	Wang Ting-son (KMT) 43.58%	DPP gain.
Taitung County		Liu Chao-how (DPP)	Liu Chao-how (DPP) 64.18%	Chen Chien-ke (KMT) 35.81%	Incumbent re-elected.
Penghu County		Yang Yao (DPP)	Yang Yao (DPP) 55.40%	Cheng Shuang-chuan (KMT) 39.99%	Incumbent re-elected.
Keelung City		Hsieh Kuo-liang (KMT)	Cai Shi-ying (DPP) 41.45%	Hau Lung-bin (KMT) 36.14%	DPP gain.
Hsinchu City		Lu Hsueh-chang (KMT)	Ker Chien-ming (DPP) 41.33%	Cheng Cheng-chien (KMT) 36.46%	DPP gain.
Chiayi City		Lee Chun-yi (DPP)	Lee Chun-yi (DPP) 53.95%	Wu Yu-jen (KMT) 35.66%	Incumbent re-elected.
Kinmen County		Yang Ying-hsiung (KMT)	Yang Ying-hsiung (KMT) 45.08%	Wu Cherng-dean (NP) 25.93%	Incumbent re-elected.
Lienchiang County		Cheng Hsueh-sheng (KMT)	Cheng Hsueh-sheng (KMT) 68.07%	Lin Chin-kuan (Nonpartisan) 17.67%	Incumbent re-elected.
Lowland Aborigine		Sra Kacaw (KMT)	Sra Kacaw (KMT) 28.51%		Incumbent re-elected.
Lowland Aborigine		Liao Kuo-tung (KMT)	Liao Kuo-tung (KMT) 20.57%		Incumbent re-elected.
Lowland Aborigine		Lin Cheng-er (PFP)	Chen Ying (DPP) 18.02%		DPP gain.
Highland Aborigine		Kao Chin Su-mei (NPSU)	Kao Chin Su-mei (NPSU) 24.51%		Incumbent re-elected.
Highland Aborigine		Chien Tung-ming (KMT)	Chien Tung-ming (KMT) 22.96%		Incumbent re-elected.
Highland Aborigine		Kung Wen-chi (KMT)	Kung Wen-chi (KMT) 17.80%		Incumbent re-elected.

Source: Central Election Commission

=== Results by party-list ===
Party	Elected members
Democratic Progressive	Wu Kuen-yuh, Wu Yu-chin, Chen Man-li, Wellington Koo, Frida Tsai, Wang Jung-chang, Kolas Yotaka, Karen Yu, Su Jia-chyuan, Tuan Yi-kang, Cheng Li-chun, Chen Chi-mai, Yu Mei-nu, Lee Ying-yuan, Chung Kung-chao, Lin Ching-yi, Hsu Kuo-yung, Chou Chun-mi
Kuomintang	Wang Jin-pyng, Ko Chih-en, Arthur Chen, Lin Li-chan, Jason Hsu, Tseng Ming-chung, Huang Chao-shun, John Wu, Chang Li-shan, Hsu Chen-wei, Alicia Wang
People First	Lee Hung-chun, Chen Yi-chieh, Chou Chen Hsiu-hsia
New Power	Kawlo Iyun Pacidal, Hsu Yung-ming

== Aftermath ==
Kuomintang Vice Chairman Hau Lung-bin announced he was stepping down after his surprising defeat in the Keelung City Constituency by relatively unknown city councillor Tsai Shih-ying from the DPP, following the Party Chairman Eric Chu, who also resigned from the leadership after his defeat in the presidential election.

== By-elections ==
A total of five legislative seats are scheduled to be contested in by-elections, as both the Kuomintang and Democratic Progressive Party drew candidates for local office from sitting legislators during the 2018 local elections. The first two by-elections are scheduled for 26 January 2019.

== See also ==
- 2016 Kuomintang chairmanship election
- 2017 Kuomintang chairmanship election
