= Yang Chih-yuan =

Yang Chih-yuan may refer to:

- Jerry Yang (born 1968), Chinese name Yang Chih-yuan, Taiwanese-American entrepreneur and the co-founder of Yahoo! Inc
- Yang Chih-yuan (politician) (born 1990), Taiwanese nationalist politician
- Yang Chih-yuan, a Taiwanese student involved in a controversy about stamps designed for the International Day of Peace in 2004
