= Penghu County Constituency =

Constituency of the Legislative Yuan of Taiwan

- Single-member constituency for the Legislative Yuan
- District(s): Penghu
- Electorate: 91,352 (2024 election)

Current constituency
- Created: 1989
- Party: DPP
- Member: Yang Yao

Penghu County Constituency (Chinese: 澎湖縣選舉區; pinyin: Pénghú Xiàn Xuǎnjǔ Qū) is one of the 73 regional constituencies represented in the Legislative Yuan, the national legislature of Taiwan. It was created in 1989 following democratisation, and elects one legislator, through first-past-the-post voting, to the Legislative Yuan. It has been represented by Yang Yao of the Democratic Progressive Party since 2012.

== Legislators ==
Election	Legislator	Party
1989 - 1992	Chen Kuei-miao	Kuomintang
1992 - 1995	Chen Kuei-miao	New Party
1995 - 2001	Lin Pin-kuan	Kuomintang
2001 - 2004	Lin Pin-kuan	Independent
2004 - 2012	Lin Pin-kuan	Non-Partisan Solidarity Union
2012	Yang Yao	Democratic Progressive Party

== Election results ==

=== 1995 ===
1995 Taiwanese legislative election: Penghu
Candidate	Party	Votes	%	+/–
Lin Pin-kuan	Kuomintang	26,055	65.85	▼23.69
Chen Shao-liang	Democratic Progressive Party	10,942	27.66	▲17.20
Hsiao Ting-yuan	New Party	2,052	5.19	NEW
Kao Yeh-chen	National Democratic Non-Partisan Alliance	517	1.31	NEW
Total		39,566	100.00	–
Valid votes		39,566	98.80	
Invalid/blank votes		482	1.20	
Total votes		40,048	100.00	
Registered voters/turnout		63,605	62.96	
Majority		15,113	38.19	
Kuomintang gain from New Party				

=== 1998 ===
* denotes the incumbent legislator

1998 Taiwanese legislative election: Penghu
Candidate	Party	Votes	%	+/–
Lin Pin-kuan*	Kuomintang	22,342	62.78	▼3.07
Hsu Pi-lung	Democratic Progressive Party	11,079	31.13	▲3.47
Chen Cheng-chia	Independent	2,169	6.09	NEW
Total		35,590	100.00	–
Valid votes		35,590	98.64	
Invalid/blank votes		491	1.36	
Total votes		36,081	100.00	
Registered voters/turnout		64,104	56.29	
Majority		11,263	31.65	
Kuomintang hold				

=== 2001 ===
* denotes the incumbent legislator

2001 Taiwanese legislative election: Penghu
Candidate	Party	Votes	%	+/–
Lin Pin-kuan*	Independent	21,534	53.81	NEW
Yang Yao	Democratic Progressive Party	11,617	29.03	▼2.10
Lu Wen-i	People First Party	5,519	13.79	NEW
Lin Su-mei	Independent	1,022	2.55	NEW
Chang Ying-chung	New Party	330	0.82	NEW
Total		40,022	100.00	–
Valid votes		40,022	98.44	
Invalid/blank votes		636	1.56	
Total votes		40,658	100.00	
Registered voters/turnout		67,168	60.53	
Majority		9,917	24.78	
Independent gain from Kuomintang				

=== 2004 ===
* denotes the incumbent legislator

2004 Taiwanese legislative election: Penghu
Candidate	Party	Votes	%	+/–
Lin Pin-kuan*	Non-Partisan Solidarity Union	22,650	59.87	NEW
Kao Chih-peng	Democratic Progressive Party	14,933	39.47	▲10.44
Hsu Ching-min	Independent	250	0.66	NEW
Total		37,833	100.00	–
Valid votes		37,833	99.13	
Invalid/blank votes		332	0.87	
Total votes		38,165	100.00	
Registered voters/turnout		69,339	55.04	
Majority		7,717	20.4	
Non-Partisan Solidarity Union gain from Independent				

=== 2008 ===
* denotes the incumbent legislator

2008 Taiwanese legislative election: Penghu
Candidate	Party	Votes	%	+/–
Lin Pin-kuan*	Non-Partisan Solidarity Union	19,584	50.72	▼9.15
Chen Kuang-fu	Democratic Progressive Party	15,356	39.77	▲0.30
Ou Chung-kai	Independent	3,373	8.74	NEW
Huang Chung-yang	Great Compassionate Salvation Party	300	0.78	NEW
Total		38,613	100.00	–
Valid votes		38,613	98.55	
Invalid/blank votes		568	1.45	
Total votes		39,181	100.00	
Registered voters/turnout		71,368	54.90	
Majority		4,228	10.95	
Non-Partisan Solidarity Union hold				

=== 2012 ===
* denotes the incumbent legislator

2012 Taiwanese legislative election: Penghu
Candidate	Party	Votes	%	+/–
Yang Yao	Democratic Progressive Party	23,823	53.44	▲13.67
Lin Pin-kuan*	Non-Partisan Solidarity Union	20,756	46.56	▼4.16
Total		44,579	100.00	–
Valid votes		44,579	97.80	
Invalid/blank votes		1,003	2.20	
Total votes		45,582	100.00	
Registered voters/turnout		76,972	59.22	
Majority		3,067	6.88	
Democratic Progressive Party gain from Non-Partisan Solidarity Union				

=== 2016 ===
* denotes the incumbent legislator

2016 Taiwanese legislative election: Penghu
Candidate	Party	Votes	%	+/–
Yang Yao*	Democratic Progressive Party	23,107	55.40	▲1.96
Chen Shuang-chuan	Kuomintang	16,680	39.99	NEW
Hsien I-che	Trees Party	1,523	3.65	NEW
Huang Han-tung	Taiwan Labour Party (Note: Not affiliated with Labor Party (Taiwan))	399	0.96	NEW
Total		41,709	100.00	–
Valid votes		41,709	97.19	
Invalid/blank votes		1,208	2.81	
Total votes		42,917	100.00	
Registered voters/turnout		83,154	51.61	
Majority		6,427	15.41	
Democratic Progressive Party hold				

=== 2020 ===
* denotes the incumbent legislator

2020 Taiwanese legislative election: Penghu
Candidate	Party	Votes	%	+/–
Yang Yao*	Democratic Progressive Party	26,737	53.77	▼1.63
Ou Chung-kai	Kuomintang	22,332	44.91	▲4.92
Lu Ying-hung	Formosa Alliance	653	1.31	NEW
Total		49,722	100.00	–
Valid votes		49,722	97.47	
Invalid/blank votes		1,291	2.53	
Total votes		51,013	100.00	
Registered voters/turnout		87,287	58.44	
Majority		4,405	8.86	
Democratic Progressive Party hold				

=== 2024 ===
* denotes the incumbent legislator

2024 Taiwanese legislative election: Penghu
Candidate	Party	Votes	%	+/–
Yang Yao*	Democratic Progressive Party	24,669	50.95	▼2.82
Wu Cheng-chieh	Kuomintang	20,226	41.77	▼3.14
Chen Hui-chuan	Independent	3,525	7.28	NEW
Total		48,420	100.00	–
Valid votes		48,420	98.36	
Invalid/blank votes		809	1.64	
Total votes		49,229	100.00	
Registered voters/turnout		91,352	53.89	
Majority		4,443	9.18	
Democratic Progressive Party hold				
