= Lin Kuo-cheng =

Lin Kuo-cheng may refer to:

- Lin Kuo-cheng (born 1957) (Chinese: 林國成), Taiwanese politician, elected to the Legislative Yuan in 2024
- Lin Kuo-cheng (born 1966) (Chinese: 林國正), Taiwanese politician, served on the Legislative Yuan from 2012 to 2016
