= Chou Wu-liu =

Taiwanese politician

Chiu Wu-liu MLY
- 周五六

Member of the Legislative Yuan
- In office 1 February 1999 – 31 January 2002
- Constituency: Tainan County

Personal details
- Born: 8 August 1950 (age 75)
- Party: People First Party (since 2015)
- Other political affiliations: Kuomintang (until 2015)

Chou Wu-liu (Chinese: 周五六; pinyin: Zhōu Wǔliù; born 8 August 1950) is a Taiwanese politician.

== Career ==
Chou attended the National Tseng-Wen Senior Agricultural and Industrial Vocational School.

Chou was elected to four consecutive terms on the Tainan County Council. During his third term, he was elected deputy speaker, and served as speaker in his fourth term. Chou was elected to the Legislative Yuan in 1998 as a representative of Tainan County. In 2000, Chou, Lo Fu-chu, and Lin Ming-yi were charged with assaulting their legislative colleague Yu Jane-daw in a meeting on 15 July 1999. The Taipei District Court ruled in March 2001 that the three legislators were to serve 59 days in prison. Upon appeal to the Taiwan High Court, the trio's sentence was increased to five months imprisonment or a NT$135,000 fine. The verdict was delivered a day after Chou completed his term in the legislature, which ended his legislative immunity, and declared final. During Chou's legislative tenure, his friend Lo assaulted another lawmaker, Diane Lee. When the Legislative Yuan's Discipline Committee was convened to vote on an appropriate response, Chou avoided attending the proceedings. After the committee suggested a six-month suspension for Lu, and forwarded the proposal for a vote by the full legislature, Chou attended the session to vote against it.

In 2006, judge Hsu Hung-chi of the Taiwan High Court was arrested for taking bribes from Chou. Hsu had reportedly accepted NT$10 million from Chou, and subsequently ruled in a 2001 court case that Chou was not guilty of electoral fraud during his tenure as vice speaker of the Tainan County Council. Hsu was impeached by the Control Yuan in November 2008, and removed from office in June 2009.

Chou is married to Chen Hsiu-hsia. He switched party affiliations from the Kuomintang to the People First Party (PFP) on 14 August 2015. Chou resigned as secretary-general of the Tainan City Council in September 2015 to take a position on James Soong's 2016 presidential campaign. After Chou refused a nomination from the PFP, the party chose to nominate his wife as a candidate in the 2016 legislative election.
