= New Taipei City Constituency 9 =

Constituency of the Legislative Yuan of Taiwan

- Single-member constituency for the Legislative Yuan
- District(s): Yonghe, Zhonghe (17 villages)
- Electorate: 238,299 (2024 election)

Current constituency
- Created: 2008 (as Taipei County Constituency 9); 2010 (current name)
- Party: KMT
- Member: Lin Te-fu

New Taipei City Constituency 9 (Chinese: 新北市第九選舉區; pinyin: Xīnběi Shì Dìjiǔ Xuǎnjǔ Qū) is one of the 73 regional constituencies represented in the Legislative Yuan, the national legislature of Taiwan. It was created in 2008 (as Taipei County Constituency 9) following a series of constitutional reforms, and elects one legislator, through first-past-the-post voting, to the Legislative Yuan. It has been represented by Lin Te-fu of the Kuomintang since 2008.

== Legislators ==
Election	Legislator	Party
2008	Lin Te-fu	Kuomintang

== Election results ==
=== 2008 (Note: Named Taipei County Constituency 9, boundaries unchanged.) ===
2008 Taiwanese legislative election: Taipei County 9
Candidate	Party	Votes	%
Lin Te-fu	Kuomintang	98,634	69.61
Hung I-ping	Independent	27,044	19.09
Chou Ni-an	Taiwan Solidarity Union	15,669	11.06
Yang Hsi-chou	Taiwan Constitution Association	338	0.24
Total		141,685	100.00
Valid votes		141,685	97.54
Invalid/blank votes		3,569	2.46
Total votes		145,254	100.00
Registered voters/turnout		236,458	61.43
Majority		71,590	50.52
Kuomintang win (new seat)			

=== 2012 ===
* denotes the incumbent legislator

2012 Taiwanese legislative election: New Taipei 9
Candidate	Party	Votes	%	+/–
Lin Te-fu*	Kuomintang	89,767	48.84	▼20.77
Hsu Yu-ming	Democratic Progressive Party	50,656	27.56	NEW
Joanna Lei	Independent	42,832	23.30	NEW
Tsang Wen-sheng	Institutional Island of Saving the World	561	0.31	NEW
Total		183,816	100.00	–
Valid votes		183,816	98.60	
Invalid/blank votes		2,605	1.40	
Total votes		186,421	100.00	
Registered voters/turnout		239,622	77.80	
Majority		39,111	21.28	
Kuomintang hold				

=== 2016 ===
* denotes the incumbent legislator

2016 Taiwanese legislative election: New Taipei 9
Candidate	Party	Votes	%	+/–
Lin Te-fu*	Kuomintang	82,761	52.44	▲3.60
Li Hsing-chang	Independent	46,660	29.56	NEW
Chang Ching-fang	Minkuotang	23,767	15.06	NEW
Tung Chien-i	The Motorists' Party of ROC	3,040	1.93	NEW
Tseng Wen-sheng	National Health Service Alliance	1,594	1.01	NEW
Total		157,822	100.00	–
Valid votes		157,822	96.33	
Invalid/blank votes		6,018	3.67	
Total votes		163,840	100.00	
Registered voters/turnout		239,962	68.28	
Majority		36,101	22.88	
Kuomintang hold				

=== 2020 ===
* denotes the incumbent legislator

2020 Taiwanese legislative election: New Taipei 9
Candidate	Party	Votes	%	+/–
Lin Te-fu*	Kuomintang	102,108	56.41	▲3.97
Tsai Mu-lin	Democratic Progressive Party	68,206	37.68	NEW
Chen Kai-ning	Taiwan Renewal Party	4,881	2.70	NEW
Chan Yu-hsien	Taiwan Statebuilding Party	3,053	1.69	NEW
Lin Sheng-chou	Labor Party	1,850	1.02	NEW
Yang Chih-yuan	Taiwan Action Party Alliance	900	0.50	NEW
Total		180,998	100.00	–
Valid votes		180,998	97.73	
Invalid/blank votes		4,203	2.27	
Total votes		185,201	100.00	
Registered voters/turnout		241,303	76.75	
Majority		33,902	18.73	
Kuomintang hold				

=== 2024 ===
* denotes the incumbent legislator

2024 Taiwanese legislative election: New Taipei 9
Candidate	Party	Votes	%	+/–
Lin Te-fu*	Kuomintang	98,260	57.73	▲1.32
Chuang Ming-yuan	Democratic Progressive Party	50,613	29.73	▼7.95
Chen Kai-ning	Taiwan Renewal Party	21,345	12.54	▲9.84
Total		170,218	100.00	–
Valid votes		170,218	96.19	
Invalid/blank votes		6,740	3.81	
Total votes		176,958	100.00	
Registered voters/turnout		238,299	74.26	
Majority		47,647	28	
Kuomintang hold				
