= Motorists Party =

Motorists Party may refer to:

- The Motorists Party (Queensland), known as "Civil Liberties, Consumer Rights, No-Tolls" until March 2020
- The national Australian Motoring Enthusiast Party
- The former Australian Motorist Party, based in the Australian Capital Territory
- The Motorists' Party of ROC, a minor political party in Taiwan
- Motorists for Themselves, a Czech political party
