= Chiang Yung-chang =

Taiwanese politician (born 1969)

- 江永昌
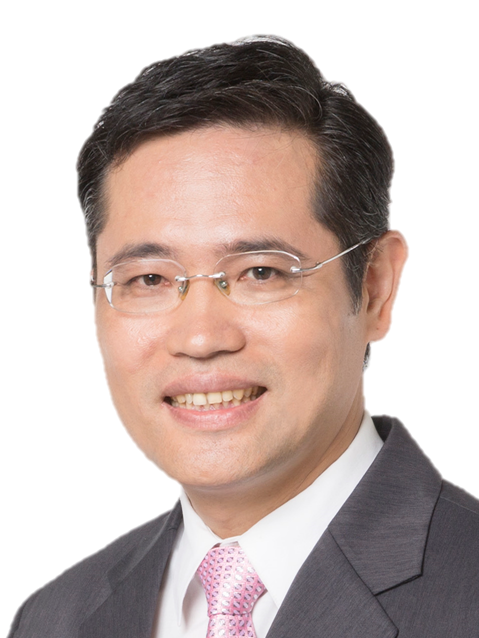

Member of the Legislative Yuan
- In office 1 February 2016 – 31 January 2024
- Preceded by: Chang Ching-chung
- Succeeded by: Chang Chih-lun
- Constituency: New Taipei 8

Member of the New Taipei City Council
- In office 25 December 2010 – 31 January 2016
- Constituency: District 5 (Zhonghe)

Member of the Taipei County Council
- In office 1 March 2006 – 25 December 2010
- Constituency: District 2 (Zhonghe)

Personal details
- Born: 22 October 1969 (age 57) Taipei County, Taiwan
- Party: Democratic Progressive Party
- Education: National Chung Hsing University (BS); National Taiwan Normal University (MA); National Taiwan University (ME); National Taiwan University of Science and Technology (MA)

Chiang Yung-chang (Chinese: 江永昌; born 22 October 1969) is a Taiwanese politician. He was a member of the Taipei County Council from 2006 to 2010, and served on the succeeding body, known as the New Taipei City Council, until his election to the Legislative Yuan in 2016.

== Education ==
Chiang attended Zhonghe Elementary School, Taipei County Hai-Shan Junior High School, and graduated from Taipei Municipal Chien Kuo High School. He then earned a B.S. in physics from National Chung Hsing University, a master's degree in political science from National Taiwan Normal University, a Master of Engineering (M.E.) in industrial engineering from National Taiwan University, and a master's degree in finance from the National Taiwan University of Science and Technology. Chiang has also taken master's-level coursework in law at National Taipei University.

== Political career ==
=== Early and municipal political career ===
Chiang began his political career as a legislative aide to Eugene Jao. He was elected to the final term of the Taipei County Council in 2005, and twice to the succeeding New Taipei City Council in 2010 and 2014. As a city councillor, Chiang commented on the population density of his Zhonghe District.

=== Legislative Yuan ===
Chiang first ran for the Legislative Yuan in 2012 as a Democratic Progressive Party candidate for the New Taipei 8 seat. While formally completing his election registration, Chiang and a group of DPP candidates based in New Taipei dressed in Robin Hood costumes. During his 2012 campaign, Chiang ran on the slogan "Taiwan hearts, Myanmar sentiments", in recognition of the large population of Sino-Burmese living in the area. Chiang lost to incumbent Chang Ching-chung. Chiang defeated Chang in 2016, and vacated his New Taipei City council seat. Chiang won a second term on the Legislative Yuan in 2020, and did not contest the 2024 election.

During his first term in office, Chiang proposed amendments to the Civil Servants Retirement Act, the Statute Governing the Retirement of School Faculty and Staff, the Narcotics Hazard Prevention Act, and the Money Laundering Control Act. In 2018, Chiang participated in the Legislative Yuan's internship program, providing experience to those who were interested in pursuing a political career.

He supported the William Lai-led Executive Yuan's decision to raise wages for military personnel, civil servants and teachers, but criticized the same body for proposing amendments to the Labor Standards Act that would reduce workers' rights and working conditions. Despite his criticisms of the proposed amendments, Chiang voted to advance them to committee review. In his second term, Chiang expressed support for revising the Insurance Act to ensure that the labor rights of insurance agents were more protected.

From his first term as a Legislative Yuan member, Chiang was active in discussions shaping the Taiwanese banking and related industries. To this end, he drafted a bill mandating that a person employed by a financial institution could not lead their company's compliance and legal departments simultaneously, and that the top compliance officer should report directly to a board of directors instead of the company president. Separately from the bill, he called for the financial sector as a whole to maintain a consistent information security standard. This interest continued into his second term in office. He also supported lowering taxes for young workers, providing a tax exemption to small business, and decreasing the consumption tax threshold for foreign visitors to Taiwan.

Regarding public health and safety in Taiwan, Chiang advocated for third parties as well as drunk drivers to be held liable, offering an example of companies who encourage employees to drink at company-sanctioned events, but do not offer to pay for transportation services, instead allowing inebriated workers to drive themselves home. During the COVID-19 pandemic, he urged the Ministry of Health and Welfare to issue cash subsidies to clinics that closed due to delays in the distribution of government funding, and asked the Ministry of Economic Affairs to exempt hospitals from electricity rate hikes. Additionally, Chiang called for laws against revenge pornography to be strengthened, and proposed a bill to amend the Criminal Code of the Republic of China to combat deepfaked media.

Throughout his legislative tenure, Chiang maintained an interest in housing-related issues.

A vote on lifting import restrictions on livestock treated with ractopamine was held in December 2020, during Chiang's second term in office. Chiang abstained from the vote, instead of voting in support, and the Democratic Progressive Party caucus fined him NT$30,000 and prohibited him from running for committee membership or party leadership positions for three years. In February 2021, the DPP suspended Chiang's party membership for one year. Also during his second term, Chiang supported harsher punishments for violations of the National Security Act and opposed the proposed reactivation of the Cross-Strait Service Trade Agreement and the Nanshi River-to-Shihmen Reservoir water diversion project.

== Personal life ==
Chiang Yung-chang is married to Wu Shu-ching. Wu is a middle school teacher.
