= Chang Chih-lun =

Taiwanese politician (born 1983)

- 張智倫
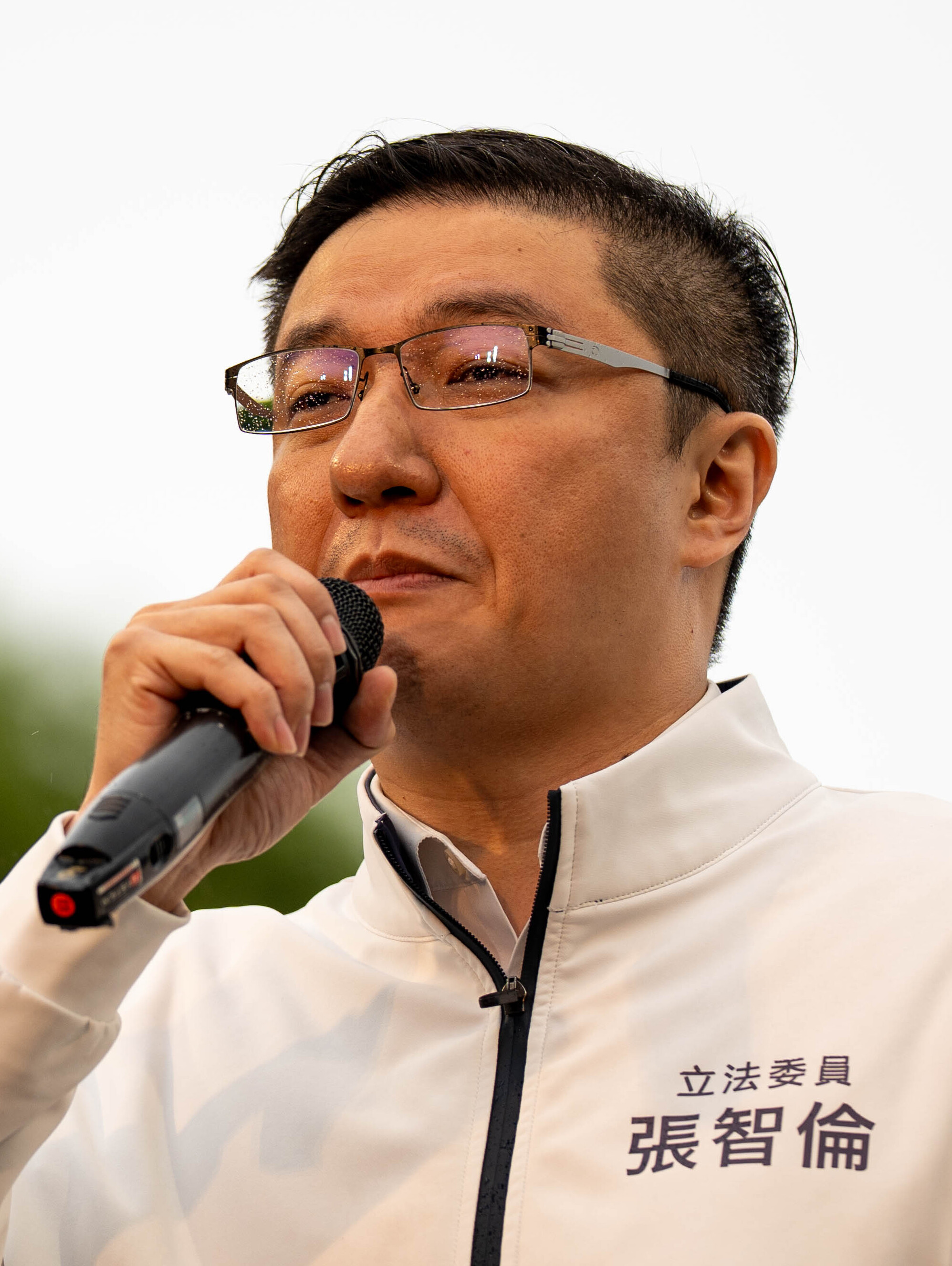
- Chang in 2025

Member of the Legislative Yuan
- Incumbent
- Assumed office 1 February 2024
- Preceded by: Chiang Yung-chang
- Constituency: New Taipei 8

Personal details
- Born: 24 November 1983 (age 42)
- Party: Kuomintang
- Parents: Chang Ching-chung (father); Chen Ching-ting (mother)
- Education: Ming Chuan University (BAcc); Fairleigh Dickinson University (MS)

Chang Chih-lun (Chinese: 張智倫; born 24 November 1983) is a Taiwanese politician and accountant who has served as a member of the Legislative Yuan since 2024.

== Early life and education ==
Chang was born on November 21, 1983. He is one of three sons of politician Chang Ching-chung, who formerly served in the Legislative Yuan, and his wife, Chen Ching-ting, a member of the New Taipei City Council.

After high school, Chang graduated from Ming Chuan University with a bachelor's degree in accounting. He then earned a Master of Science (M.S.) in accounting from Fairleigh Dickinson University in the United States in 2008.

== Political career ==
In April 2019, Chang Chih-lun contested the Kuomintang party primary for the 2020 legislative election. He was seeking the New Taipei 8 seat in the Legislative Yuan once held by his father. He lost that contest, and was placed on the proportional party list instead. When the list was first announced, Chang was ranked in the 27th position. When the list was finalized, Chang was listed 26th. The Kuomintang won 33.36% of the party list vote, enabling thirteen legislators to take office; Chang was not seated to the Legislative Yuan. In March 2020, Chang was elected head of the Kuomintang branch office in Zhonghe. Chang received KMT support to run in the 2024 election and faced Democratic Progressive Party candidate Justin Wu and Taiwan People's Party candidate Andy Chiu. Chang was elected to the Legislative Yuan in his second bid for the office.
