= National Socialism Association =

Neo-Nazi organization in Taiwan

National Socialism Association 國家社會主義學會
- Abbreviation: NSA
- Chairperson: Joshua Yue Shu-ya
- Spokesperson: Hsu Na-chi
- Founded: c. August 2005
- Headquarters: Taipei
- Newspaper: National Socialism Biweekly
- Membership (2007): 20
- Ideology: Neo-Nazism; Chiangism; Chinese ultranationalism; Chinese unification
- Political position: Far-right
- Religion: Confucianism

National Socialism Association
- Traditional Chinese: 國家社會主義學會
- Simplified Chinese: 国家社会主义学会
Transcriptions
Standard Mandarin
- Hanyu Pinyin: Guójiā Shèhuì Zhǔyì Xuéhuì
Hakka
- Romanization: Koet-kâ Sa-fi Chú-ngi Ho̍k-fi
Southern Min
- Hokkien POJ: Kok-ka Siā-hōe Chú-gī Ha̍k-hōe

The National Socialism Association (NSA) (Note: In local languages: Traditional Chinese script: 國家社會主義學會; Mandarin Pinyin: Guójiā Shèhuì Zhǔyì Xuéhuì; Hokkien: Kok-ka Siā-hōe Chú-gī Ha̍k-hōe; Sixian Hakka: Koet-kâ Sa-fi Chú-ngi Ho̍k-fi) is a neo-Nazi and Chinese nationalist political organization in Taiwan, founded in August 2005 by participants of the online forum Taiwan Nazi. It received international attention in March 2007, following reports of its inaugural in-person meeting that month.

Despite its use of Nazi iconography and praise of Nazi leader Adolf Hitler, the NSA claims that it is not a neo-Nazi organization. The group's activities and practices have been condemned by a number of prominent Jewish organizations and individuals. Several domestic and international political commentators have also criticized the NSA's leadership for their lack of knowledge regarding the Holocaust and Nazism in general.

== History ==
NSA chair Joshua Yue Shu-ya stated that the organization was founded some time in August 2005 by participants of the online forum Taiwan Nazi. The forum was later transformed into the NSA's website.

The NSA was registered as a public organization under Taiwanese law in September 2006. Its registerers were two political science graduates: Hsu Na-chi, (Note: In local languages: Traditional Chinese script: 許娜綺; Mandarin Pinyin: Xǔ Nàqǐ) at the time a 22-year-old who had recently completed her bachelor's at Soochow University; and Lahn Chao Wei, (Note: In local languages: Traditional Chinese script: 趙威; Mandarin Pinyin: Zhào Wēi) a 24-year-old postgraduate who was pursuing his master's degree in political science at National Chengchi University. The registration was met with backlash both domestically and abroad, with critics calling for the registration's reversal. The Taiwanese government, however, responded that the establishment and existence of the NSA were protected by the country's constitution, which guarantees freedom of speech and organization.

The NSA's inaugural in-person meeting was held on 17 March 2007 in Taichung. It was reportedly attended by ten people. The NSA issued a public apology the day after the meeting, saying it "rejects violence and illegality, and is not based on the ideas of Hitler." Taiwan's Ministry of Foreign Affairs responded that the NSA had already damaged the country's reputation abroad.

== Ideology ==
The NSA follows a mixture of the political philosophies of Adolf Hitler and Chiang Kai-shek. Chiang led the government of the Republic of China (ROC), which retreated to Taiwan in 1949, from 1928 until his death in 1975. The NSA argues that Chiang's goal of Chinese unification under the ROC government can be achieved by establishing a fascist dictatorship, which would cultivate a Taiwanese military capable of retaking the mainland by force. In an interview with Apple Daily on 10 March 2007, Hsu argued that the constant political struggle between the Kuomintang and the Democratic Progressive Party had hampered Taiwan's ability to nation-build, and so the establishment of a fascist state was needed to end the conflict and bring stability. Chao meanwhile wrote a public statement on the NSA's website on 13 March 2007, saying that he was not a racist or a neo-Nazi, but he nonetheless "identifies with Nazi ideology".

== Criticisms and condemnations ==
Various prominent Jewish organizations and individuals around the world have condemned the NSA. The Simon Wiesenthal Center condemned the NSA on 13 March 2007 for championing Hitler and blaming democracy for Taiwan's "social unrest". Raphael Gamzou, Israel's representative in Taiwan at the time, described the group as "ignorant and stupid".

Chao responded to accusations of racism and antisemitism by asserting that the NSA merely aimed to "develop Taiwan's strength, foster national unity, and restore traditional Chinese values like Confucianism". Chao stated that the group was rooted in the ideas of Sun Yat-sen, not Adolf Hitler. Yue similarly claimed that the NSA had "nothing to do with Nazism" and its members wanted to "study Hitler's good points, not his massacres". The German public broadcaster Deutsche Welle pushed back against the NSA's assertions of moderateness, saying:

All members of the NSA admire Hitler and Nazi Germany. However, on the surface, they only say that Taiwan should be strong. On the surface, they do not engage in racism or antisemitism. But in fact, they do hold these ideas. It is very dangerous to choose this political path.

Angelica Oung of the Taipei Times noted that Chao had regularly posted photos of himself in Nazi cosplay on the NSA's website when it was still online, while Yue had made several posts reminiscent of Nazi rhetoric. For example, Yue called for harsher immigration restrictions, the criminalization of interracial marriage, and the killing of infants born to migrant workers. Emile Sheng, a municipal official in Taipei, commented on the NSA's backtracking, saying: "People here do not really understand what Nazism is. They are not really racist or antisemitic. They do not even know what it means."

== Membership ==
The NSA had 20 dues-paying members in March 2007, when it attempted to register as a non-governmental organization. The registration was denied because the NSA did not have enough adult members. In this regard, Chao commented, "We have too many high school and middle school students and not enough adults."

Its website, which functioned primarily as an online forum, had more than 760 registered accounts prior to its exposure in major media; the NSA claimed that the number rose to over 1,400 afterwards. Taiwanese politician Yang Chih-yuan registered an account on the forum in late 2006, when he was in middle school.
