= Yang Yao =

Taiwanese politician

Yang Yao MLY
- 楊曜
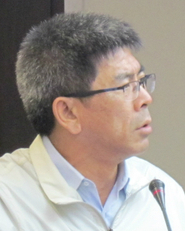
- Yang in 2015

Member of the Legislative Yuan
- Incumbent
- Assumed office 1 February 2012
- Preceded by: Lin Pin-kuan
- Constituency: Penghu County

Member of the Penghu County Council
- In office 1 March 2006 – 31 January 2012

Personal details
- Born: 6 December 1966 (age 59) Penghu County, Taiwan
- Party: Democratic Progressive Party
- Education: Tunghai University (LLB)
- Profession: Lawyer

Yang Yao (Chinese: 楊曜; born 6 December 1966) is a Taiwanese politician.

== Education ==
He attended National Magong High School in Magong, and studied law at Tunghai University.

== Political career ==
Yang was a member of the Penghu County Council from 2006 to 2012, when he was first elected to the Legislative Yuan. While serving on the county council, Yang opposed mobilizing Penghu residents to support the building of a casino in the area. The proposal was put to a referendum in September, and did not pass. In December 2010, Yang attended a protest while President Ma Ying-jeou visited Penghu. Yang stated of the central government, "We are taking to the streets because county commissioners, legislators and the president have turned a blind eye to our problems. We are not asking much. We just want fair treatment." In 2012, Yang succeeded Lin Pin-kuan as legislative representative for the Penghu County district. Yang was reelected in 2016, and formed the Renewable Power Promotion Alliance alongside fellow legislators Chen Man-li, Su Chih-fen, and Chung Chia-pin in May 2017.
