= Lin Tai-hua =

Taiwanese politician

- 林岱樺
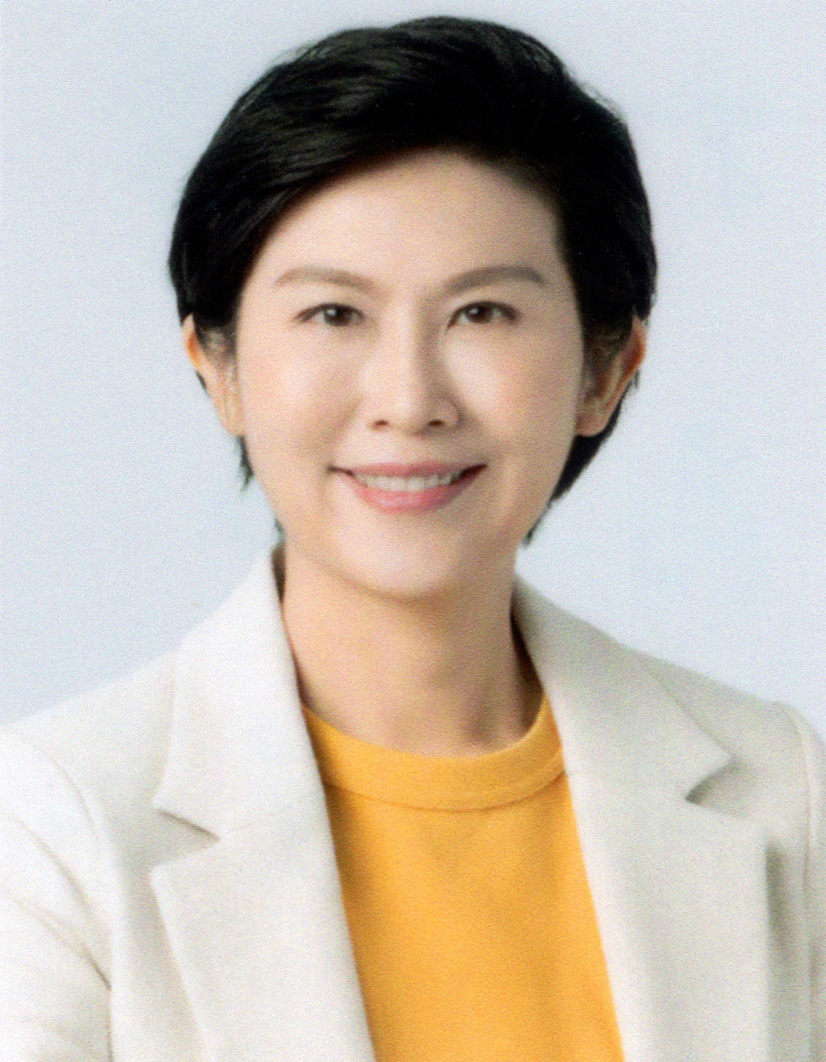
- Official portrait, 2024

Member of the Legislative Yuan
- Incumbent
- Assumed office 11 March 2011
- Preceded by: Chen Chi-yu
- Constituency: Kaohsiung 4 (Renwu, Niaosong, Daliao and Linyuan)
- In office 1 February 2002 – 31 January 2008
- Constituency: Kaohsiung County

15th Minister of the National Youth Commission
- In office 3 March 2008 – 20 May 2008
- Prime Minister: Chang Chun-hsiung
- Preceded by: Chen Tsung-shen (acting); Cheng Li-chun
- Succeeded by: Wang Yu-ting

Personal details
- Born: August 4, 1972 (age 54) Niaosong District, Kaohsiung County, Taiwan
- Party: Democratic Progressive Party
- Education: Fu Jen Catholic University (BA); University of Wisconsin–Madison (MA); University of Kassel (MA); National Taipei University (PhD)

Lin Tai-hua (Chinese: 林岱樺; pinyin: Lín Dàihuà; born August 4, 1972) is a Taiwanese politician. She is a member of the Democratic Progressive Party (DPP). After losing the election in 2008, she briefly served as the chairman of the Youth Counseling Committee of the Executive Yuan. She first was elected to the Legislative Yuan in 2002. In 2012 and 2016, she was re-elected with the highest number of votes in Kaohsiung City.

== Education ==
Lin was born in Niaosong District, Kaohsiung, in 1972. She is the daughter of Lin Sanlang, the former mayor of Fengshan City, Kaohsiung County.

After high school, Lin graduated from Fu Jen Catholic University with a bachelor's degree in German language and culture. She then earned a Master of Arts (M.A.) in journalism and mass communications from the University of Wisconsin–Madison in the United States and a master's degree in German from the University of Kassel in Germany. Later, she earned a Ph.D. in business administration at National Taipei University.

== Politics ==
In the 2001 Taiwanese legislative election, she represented the Democratic Progressive Party in the Kaohsiung County Legislative Council for the first time. She was elected with the second-highest number of votes in the constituency. The number of votes was even higher than that of Wang Jin-pyng, the former president of the Legislative Yuan in the same constituency. She was known as the fresh image because of her fresh image. In the 2004 Taiwanese legislative election, she was re-elected with a high vote.

In the 2008 Taiwanese legislative election, she represented the DPP in the Kaohsiung County Fourth Electoral District (Fengshan City) Legislator, and lost by more than 2,000 votes to the Chinese Kuomintang Legislative Candidate Jiang Lingjun, who had been reelected as a Kaohsiung County Councilor for two terms; After leaving office, she briefly took over as chairman of the Youth Development Administration of the Executive Yuan until the handover of the government on May 20, 2008.

On September 4, 2008, Lin announced her candidacy for the list of county magistrates of Kaohsiung. At the same time, Chen Chi-yu, Yu Jane-daw, Cho Chun-ying and others also expressed their intention to compete for the nomination of County Magistrate. Lin ranked first in the party's primary voter survey.

On January 21, 2009, the DPP nominated Lin to run for the Kaohsiung County magistrate election. However, at the end of June 2009, after the Ministry of the Interior (Taiwan) approved the merger of Kaohsiung County and City, the Kaohsiung County Magistrate election was cancelled, originally scheduled to be held on December 5, 2009.

In 2011, Chen Qiyu was transferred to the first deputy mayor of Kaohsiung City and participated in the seventh legislative by-election. His opponent was Hsu Ching-huang, the son of former DPP legislator Hsu Chih-ming (formerly a member of the DPP).

On March 5, 2011, she was elected as the legislator of the 2012 Taiwanese legislative election of Kaohsiung City.

In the 2012 Taiwanese legislative election, Lin was re-elected in Kaohsiung City with 64.82% of the vote.

In the 2016 Taiwanese legislative election, Lin was re-elected in the Fourth Electoral District of Kaohsiung City with 75.53% of the vote.

At the end of 2016, she expressed her intention to seek the DPP's primary nomination for mayor of Kaohsiung City.

In the 2020 Taiwanese legislative election, Lin was re-elected in Kaohsiung City with a vote rate of 60.03%.

In the 2024 Taiwanese legislative election, Lin was re-elected in Kaohsiung City with 65.31% of the city's second-highest votes.

In 2025, Lin was detained on corruption charges involving misuse of her position as a politician and a senior board member in a Kaohsiung temple to seek sponsorship from around 20 companies operating in the Linyuan Industrial Park. She was later released after posting NT$1 million (US$30,526) in bail.

== Election record ==
Year	Number of election terms	Electoral district	Political party to which	Number of votes	Vote rate	selected mark	Remark
2001	2001 Taiwanese legislative election	Kaohsiung County electoral district	DPP	72,609	12.55%		
2004	2004 Taiwanese legislative election	Kaohsiung County electoral district	DPP	51,083	9.37%		
2008	2008 Taiwanese legislative election	Kaohsiung City Fourth Electoral District	DPP	71,450	48.45%		Changes to the current selection system
2011	2011 Taiwanese legislative election	Kaohsiung City Fourth Electoral District	DPP	53,833	69.69%		
2012	2012 Taiwanese legislative election	Kaohsiung City Fourth Electoral District	DPP	111,188	64.82%		
2016	2016 Taiwanese legislative election	Kaohsiung City Fourth Electoral District	DPP	122,722	75.53%		
2020	2020 Taiwanese legislative election	Kaohsiung City Fourth Electoral District	DPP	118,219	60.03%		
2024	2024 Taiwanese legislative election	Kaohsiung City Fourth Electoral District	DPP	121,011	65.31%		
