= New Taipei City Constituency 8 =

Constituency of the Legislative Yuan of Taiwan

- Single-member constituency for the Legislative Yuan
- District(s): Zhonghe (76 villages)
- Electorate: 287,651 (2024 election)

Current constituency
- Created: 2008 (as Taipei County Constituency 8); 2010 (current name)
- Party: KMT
- Member: Chang Chih-lun

New Taipei City Constituency 8 (Chinese: 新北市第八選舉區; pinyin: Xīnběi Shì Dìbā Xuǎnjǔ Qū) is one of the 73 regional constituencies represented in the Legislative Yuan, the national legislature of Taiwan. It was created in 2008 (as Taipei County Constituency 8) following a series of constitutional reforms, and elects one legislator, through first-past-the-post voting, to the Legislative Yuan. It has been represented by Chang Chih-lun of the Kuomintang since 2024.

== Legislators ==
Election	Legislator	Party
2008 - 2016	Chang Ching-chung	Kuomintang
2016 - 2024	Chiang Yung-chang	Democratic Progressive Party
2024	Chang Chih-lun	Kuomintang

== Election results ==

=== 2008 (Note: Named Taipei County Constituency 8, boundaries unchanged.) ===
2008 Taiwanese legislative election: Taipei County 8
Candidate	Party	Votes	%
Chang Ching-chung	Kuomintang	94,785	59.55
Eugene Jao	Democratic Progressive Party	63,123	39.66
Kan Chun-jung	Independent	1,255	0.79
Total		159,163	100.00
Valid votes		159,163	98.40
Invalid/blank votes		2,585	1.60
Total votes		161,748	100.00
Registered voters/turnout		263,804	61.31
Majority		31,662	19.89
Kuomintang win (new seat)			

=== 2012 ===
* denotes the incumbent legislator

2012 Taiwanese legislative election: New Taipei 8
Candidate	Party	Votes	%	+/–
Chang Ching-chung*	Kuomintang	101,161	48.22	▼11.33
Chiang Yung-chang	Democratic Progressive Party	83,468	39.78	▲0.12
Chiu Pei-lin	Independent	23,023	10.97	NEW
Chen Kuan-teng	Independent	2,147	1.02	NEW
Total		209,799	100.00	–
Valid votes		209,799	98.04	
Invalid/blank votes		4,201	1.96	
Total votes		214,000	100.00	
Registered voters/turnout		276,684	77.34	
Majority		17,693	8.44	
Kuomintang hold				

=== 2016 ===
* denotes the incumbent legislator

2016 Taiwanese legislative election: New Taipei 8
Candidate	Party	Votes	%	+/–
Chiang Yung-chang	Democratic Progressive Party	100,543	53.67	▲13.89
Chang Ching-chung*	Kuomintang	75,738	40.43	▼7.79
Tung Cheng-i	Independent	7,335	3.92	NEW
Wu Chin-kuei	Military, Civil and Faculty Alliance Party	1,596	0.85	NEW
Lin Chien-chih	National Health Service Alliance	1,316	0.70	NEW
Shao Po-hsiang	Taiwan Constitution Association	817	0.44	NEW
Total		187,345	100.00	–
Valid votes		187,345	96.78	
Invalid/blank votes		6,241	3.22	
Total votes		193,586	100.00	
Registered voters/turnout		282,028	68.64	
Majority		24,805	13.24	
Democratic Progressive Party gain from Kuomintang				

=== 2020 ===
* denotes the incumbent legislator

2020 Taiwanese legislative election: New Taipei 8
Candidate	Party	Votes	%	+/–
Chiang Yung-chang*	Democratic Progressive Party	101,068	47.22	▼6.45
Chiu Feng-yao	Kuomintang	95,471	44.60	▲4.17
Li Cheng-hao	People First Party	13,226	6.18	NEW
Li Kuo-hsien	Stabilizing Force Party	2,977	1.39	NEW
Tsai Tsung-lin	Taiwan Action Party Alliance	739	0.35	NEW
Hsu Hui-chen	Tianzhou Peaceful Unity Family Party	574	0.27	NEW
Total		214,055	100.00	–
Valid votes		214,055	98.02	
Invalid/blank votes		4,328	1.98	
Total votes		218,383	100.00	
Registered voters/turnout		285,606	76.46	
Majority		5,597	2.62	
Democratic Progressive Party hold				

=== 2024 ===
2024 Taiwanese legislative election: New Taipei 8
Candidate	Party	Votes	%	+/–
Chang Chih-lun	Kuomintang	89,808	42.70	▼1.90
Wu Cheng	Democratic Progressive Party	77,763	36.97	▼10.25
Andy Chiu	Taiwan People's Party	42,759	20.33	NEW
Total		210,330	100.00	–
Valid votes		210,330	98.45	
Invalid/blank votes		3,314	1.55	
Total votes		213,644	100.00	
Registered voters/turnout		287,651	74.27	
Majority		12,045	5.73	
Kuomintang gain Democratic Progressive Party				
