= Lin Pin-kuan =

Taiwanese politician

Lin Pin-kuan MLY
- 林炳坤
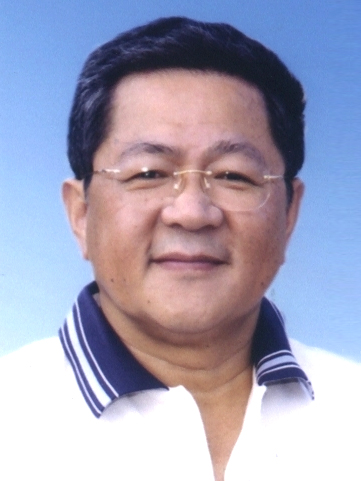

Chairman of the Non-Partisan Solidarity Union
- Incumbent
- Assumed office 15 June 2007
- Preceded by: Chang Po-ya

Member of the Legislative Yuan
- In office 1 February 1996 – 31 January 2012
- Succeeded by: Yang Yao
- Constituency: Penghu County

Personal details
- Born: 15 August 1948 (age 77) Kaohsiung County, Taiwan
- Party: Non-Partisan Solidarity Union (since 2004)
- Other political affiliations: Kuomintang (until 2001); Independent (2001–04)
- Education: National Taiwan University (BS)

Lin Pin-kuan or Peter Lin (Chinese: 林炳坤; born 15 August 1948) is a Taiwanese politician. First elected to the Legislative Yuan as a member of the Kuomintang in 1995, he continued serving until 2012. In 2004, Lin switched affiliations to the Non-Partisan Solidarity Union, and became chairman of the NPSU in 2007.

== Education and early career ==
Lin graduated from National Taiwan University with a Bachelor of Science in library science. Prior to running for office, he worked in the construction industry.

== Political career ==
Lin served his first two full terms in the Legislative Yuan, representing Penghu County, as a member of the Kuomintang. Lin left the Kuomintang in 2001, and in December, won reelection as an independent. He joined the Kuomintang caucus upon taking office for his third term in 2002. Later that year, Lin voted to confirm Yao Chia-wen as President of the Examination Yuan. Shortly after his vote was cast in opposition to KMT caucus wishes, Lin defected to a caucus convened by independents. In June 2004, Lin joined the Non-Partisan Solidarity Union. Lin won reelection twice thereafter running under the NPSU banner. In November 2010, Lin succeeded Kao Chin Su-mei as convenor of the legislature's Internal Administration Committee. His 2012 legislative bid was unsuccessful.

== Political stances ==
Lin has long supported the establishment of casinos in Penghu County. He stated in 2008 that the intention was not "to attract hardcore gamblers, but to develop casino resorts that will bring families." In 2009, Lin said that his constituents had never discussed opposition to the building of casinos with him, blaming disapproval of the initiative on the Democratic Progressive Party and people from the main island of Taiwan. The proposal was rejected by Penghu County residents via referendum in 2009. In December 2010, Lin proposed an amendment to the Offshore Islands Development Act mandating that the government should provide a living stipend, along with funds for transportation so that students native to Taiwan's outlying islands could return home at the end of the school year. To further ease travel for residents of the outlying islands, Lin moved to amend the Civil Aviation Act, so that travel via certain airports and islands received a larger subsidy.
