= Lo Ming-tsai =

Taiwanese politician (born 1967)

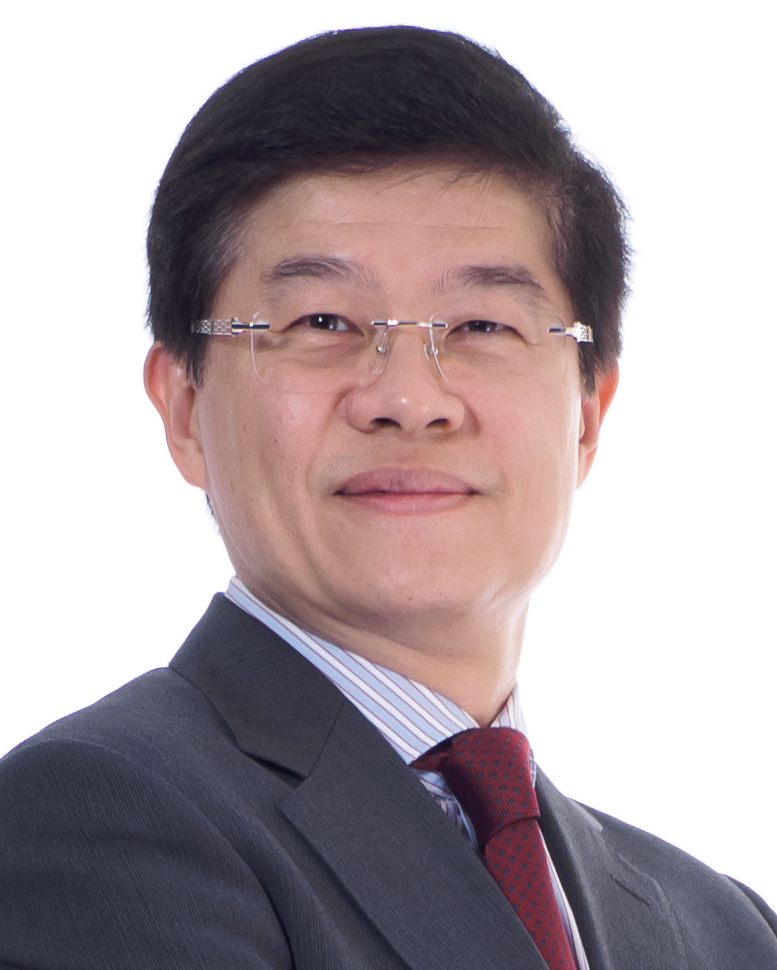
Lo Ming-Tsai in 2016.

Lo Ming-tsai (Chinese: 羅明才; born 15 January 1967) is a Taiwanese politician. He is a member of Kuomintang and represents New Taipei City Constituency XI in the Legislative Yuan.

== Early life and education ==
Lo was born on January 15, 1967, in Changhua. His father, Lo Fu-chu, was a crime boss who also served in the Legislative Yuan.

After high school, Lo graduated from Chihlee University of Technology with an associate degree in business administration. He then earned a Master of Business Administration (M.B.A.) from the City University of Seattle and a Ph.D. in economics from Sichuan University.
