= Mary Chen =

Taiwanese politician

Chen Man-li MLY
- 陳曼麗
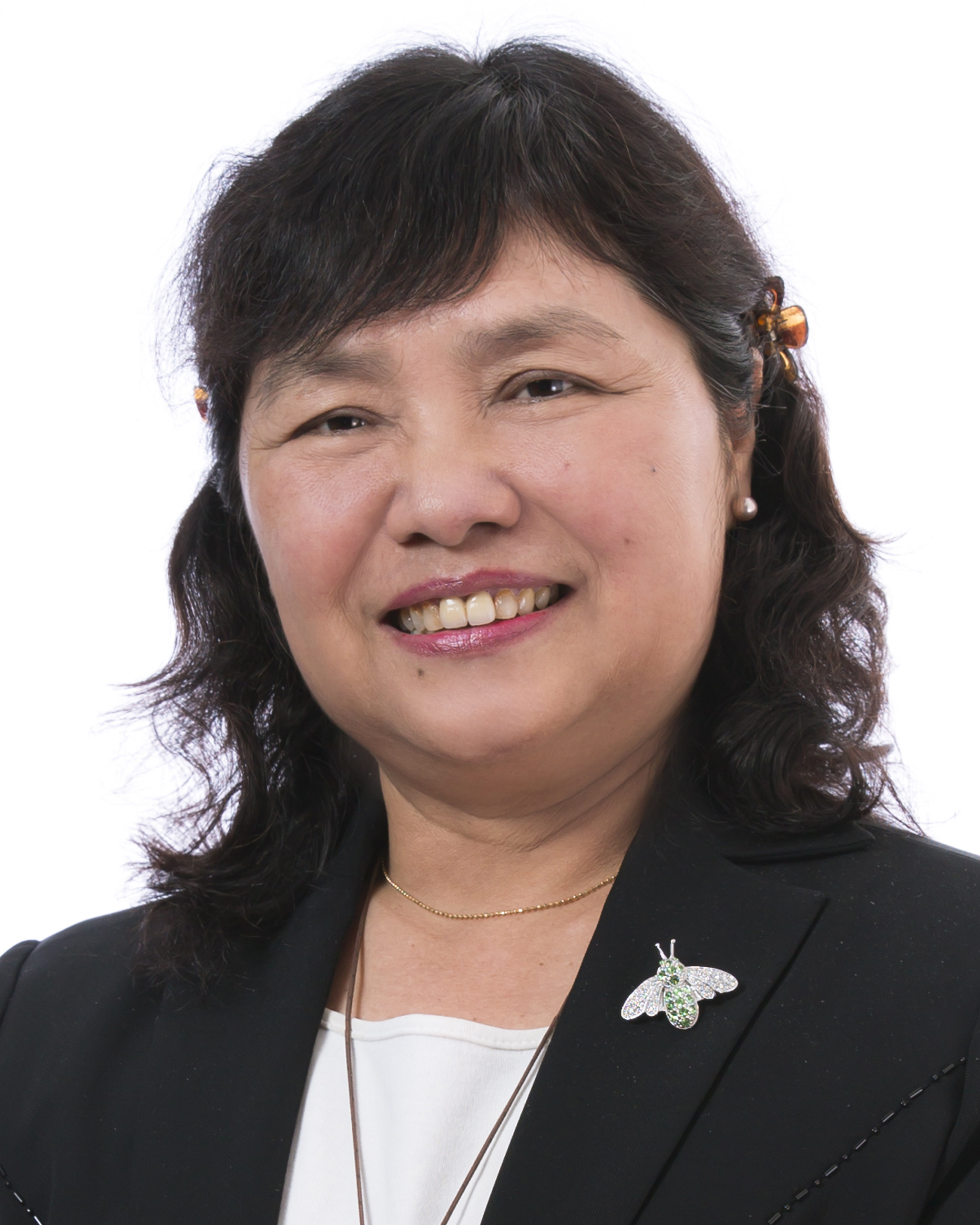
- Chen in 2016

Member of the Legislative Yuan
- In office 1 February 2016 – 31 January 2020
- Constituency: National At-Large

Personal details
- Born: 5 February 1955 (age 71) Taipei, Taiwan
- Party: Democratic Progressive Party (since 2015)
- Other political affiliations: Green Party Taiwan (until 2015)
- Education: Ming Chuan University (BS); San Diego State University (MBA)

Chen Man-li (Chinese: 陳曼麗; born 5 February 1955), also known by her English name Mary Chen, is a Taiwanese environmentalist and politician. A longtime leader of the Homemakers' Union and Foundation and the National Union of Taiwan Women’s Associations, she was an active member of Green Party Taiwan before joining the Democratic Progressive Party in 2015. She represented the DPP in the 2016 legislative elections, and won a seat via party list proportional representation.

== Education ==
Chen graduated from Ming Chuan University and earned a Master of Business Administration (M.B.A.) from San Diego State University in the United States.

== Political stances and activism ==
In a 2001 open letter co-written with nine others, Chen rejected the One China principle and advocated Taiwanese independence. In the early 2000s, she was the leader of the Homemakers' Union and Foundation. From this position, Chen advocated for a centralized collection effort regarding organic kitchen waste. She also denounced the Chinese fur trade. She has called upon governmental and private efforts to cut down on carbon dioxide emissions. By 2009, Chen had stepped down as chair of the Homemaker Union and Foundation, but later resumed the post and remained on its board of directors. She has described nuclear power as "something that can cause immense destruction when something goes wrong" in spite of increasing public support for the technology due to climate change. Chen advocated that construction of the Lungmen Nuclear Power Plant be stopped, and plans were eventually put on hold in 2014.

Chen believes that the use of ractopamine and other additives is questionable and not fully endorsed by scientific research, and that US beef imports to Taiwan found to include ractopamine should not be accepted. She is active in raising awareness for other food safety concerns, among them nitrate and radiation contamination. Chen has warned against cigarette consumption on public health and environmental grounds. She opposed the reclassification of scrap metal as non-hazardous material proposed in 2013, citing a health scare similar to food scandal that received widespread attention that year.

Chen has also led the National Union of Taiwan Women’s Associations. In this capacity, Chen opposed the appropriation of public land for government-sanctioned private and business use. In 2009, she led a protest against legislator Tsai Chin-lung, who charged public oversight organization Citizen Congress Watch with slander over an unfavorable ranking of him. Chen also participated in a campaign to bar the construction of a casino on Penghu later that year. A referendum was held in September to consider its establishment, but it failed.

As a legislator, Chen has been frequently critical of Taipower, Taiwan's state-owned electric utility. In addition to Taipower, Formosa Petrochemical and Formosa Plastics Group have also drawn her attention for subpar environmental protection efforts. Chen has pushed for the government to revise standards and clearly differentiate between types of industrial waste. With regards to animal rights, Chen supports a ban on the use of steel traps and backs government attempts to cut down on animal euthanasia.

== Career ==
Green Party Taiwan supported Chen's 2006 campaign for a seat on Taipei City Council. She later became a party convenor. Chen received Green Party Taiwan support for a legislative run in Taipei County 9th district during the 2008 election. In 2015, Chen was named to the Democratic Progressive Party proportional representation party list ballot and subsequently elected to the Legislative Yuan. In 2016, Penghu County considered a second referendum on casinos, which Chen also opposed. Like the first vote, the second referendum did not pass. She supported an amendment to the Act of Gender Equality in Employment proposed in May, which aimed to lengthen maternity leave for partners of unmarried women. Chen also backed calls to establish a government ministry leading marine conservation efforts.

Chen sat on a total of four committees, including the Social Welfare and Environmental Hygiene Committee, the Procedure Committee, the Expenditure Examination Committee, and the Foreign Affairs and National Defense Committee.
