= Lo Fu-chu =

Taiwanese crime boss

Lo Fu-chu MLY
- 羅福助
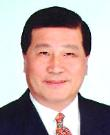

Member of the Legislative Yuan
- In office 1 February 1996 – 31 January 2002
- Constituency: Taipei County 2

Personal details
- Born: 2 July 1943 (age 83) Tao Village, Hokuto District, Taichū Prefecture, Japanese Taiwan (Today Tianwei, Changhua County, Taiwan)
- Party: Independent
- Children: Lo Ming-tsai
- Occupation: politician

Lo Fu-chu
- Traditional Chinese: 羅福助
- Simplified Chinese: 罗福助
Transcriptions
Standard Mandarin
- Hanyu Pinyin: Luó Fúzhù
Hakka
- Romanization: Lò Fuk-chhu
Southern Min
- Hokkien POJ: Lô Hok-chō͘

Lo Fu-chu (Chinese: 羅福助; born 2 July 1943) is a former Taiwanese legislator and a self-described leader of the "Celestial Alliance" organized crime group. In the late 1990s and early 2000s he was known as the most notorious person involved with organized crime then holding public office, and was reputed to be one of the wealthiest men in Taiwan. While in office he was described by other legislators as "verbally and physically violent", and he was arrested the same day that his second legislative term ended, in 2002. After leaving office Lo fought and appealed many charges over the next decade, but was eventually convicted in 2012 for money laundering and insider trading and sentenced to four years in prison. Following his conviction Lo was released on bail and subsequently disappeared. Officials at the Taiwanese Criminal Investigation Bureau believe that he has probably fled to China, where he has investments in the hotel and entertainment industries.

== Early career ==
By the early 1980s, Lo was a mid-level figure in the Taiwanese underworld. Lo's brother was murdered by another figure in the Taiwanese mafia, but Lo was not senior enough to take revenge.

In 1984 Lo was detained for three years following Operation Clean Sweep, an effort by Taiwanese police to target organized criminal organizations and their members. Including Lo, 2,346 alleged "gangsters" were arrested in Operation Clean Sweep. Following his release, Lo joined, and became a leader of, a new criminal organization named the "Celestial Alliance", which was formed by a coalition of mob bosses who had been jailed together during Operation Clean Sweep.

Lo's leadership contributed to the growth of the Celestial Alliance, and it eventually became one of the three largest organized criminal organizations in Taiwan. The Celestial Alliance has become involved in a wide variety of legal and illegal operations, including construction, entertainment, the hotel industry, waste disposal, real estate, extortion, illegal logging, cyber crime, human trafficking, arms and drug smuggling, loansharking, illegal gambling, and prostitution. They later spread to mainland China, where they made investments in the hotel and entertainment industries in and around Beijing and Shanghai. Some members have been elected to lower-level political positions, where they are often perceived as working more effectively and efficiently than their rivals. Its main rivals are "mainland" gangs: those with roots in the 1940s Kuomintang exodus to Taiwan.

In 1990 the Taiwanese government launched another initiative targeting organized crime, Operation Thunderbolt, and Lo was personally identified by Hau Pei-tsun, the Taiwanese premier, as the operation's chief target. Lo evaded detention by fleeing Taiwan, and remained abroad until 1992. While Lo was abroad, two of his sons were elected to public office: one, Lo Ming-tsai, was elected to Legislative Yuan as a Kuomintang representative, and the other was elected to the municipal assembly of Xindian.

Following his return to Taiwan, Lo became a successful entrepreneur and businessman. His investment in the construction and real estate industries, and (allegedly) in illegal gambling operations led him to become one of the wealthiest men in Taiwan. In order to establish a good relationship with the people of his hometown, Xindian, he organized a local charitable organization for the elderly and made several large public donations to the community. In 1995, motivated partially because he believed it would assist him in avoiding criminal investigation, he ran for a seat in Taiwan's Legislative Assembly as an independent candidate, and won. (In Taiwan, sitting legislators are immune from arrest or imprisonment unless a majority of their fellow legislators vote otherwise).

== Political career ==
=== Political activity ===
Lo was elected in 1995, and was re-elected in 1998. Following his election to the legislature, Lo led a small bloc of 11 independent legislators, informally referred to as the "Non-Party Alliance". Because neither of Taiwan's two major political parties (the Kuomintang (KMT) and the Democratic Progressive Party (DPP)) had clear majorities, Lo's bloc often held the deciding swing votes. He quickly acquired a reputation as a mediator and arbitrator within the government. He generally sided with the KMT on important issues, but sided with the DPP in 2000 in order to keep the DPP president, Chen Shui-bian, from being impeached.

Because of the good relationship that Lo developed with KMT legislators, he was appointed to both attend and chair numerous government committees, including transportation, construction, and several associated with business. In 1998 Lo was appointed to the legislature's judicial committee. Because of Lo's reputation as an organized crime boss, Taiwan's Justice Minister, Liao Cheng-hao, refused to attend the justice committee's meetings while he was a member. In 2000 Lo was appointed to be one of the three co-chairs of the judicial committee, but because of Lo's reputation his appointment was widely protested and criticized by the Taiwanese media, public, and judiciary.

In the 2000 presidential election the KMT vice-president, Lien Chan, attempted to utilize Lo's underworld connections in order to help him run for president. Public anger against Lo's public support of Lien was one of the factors leading to the victory of Lien's rival, Chen Shui-bian.

=== Other activities while in office ===
During Lo's first term he gained a reputation for being "verbally and physically violent". He was often at the center of several brawls that occasionally occurred within the Taiwanese legislature, once allegedly swinging an aluminum bar at his political rivals during a dispute. He threatened legislators who opposed him, telling one rival: "One day, you may not know how you die." He once insulted a DPP legislator for twenty minutes during a legislative session.

In 1996 an independent legislator, Liao Hsueh-kuang, publicly accused Lo of being a "gangster". Soon after his accusation, Liao was abducted from his home in the middle of the night, blindfolded, stripped naked and locked inside a dog cage that was then left at the side of the road beside a banner that read "Doing Justice for Heaven". Lo denied any involvement. A young man was later arrested, but it was widely assumed that the Celestial Alliance was responsible.

In 1999 Lo attempted to strangle a DPP legislator, Yu Jane-daw, during a legislative session when Yu attempted to interrupt Lo, who was fighting Lee Wen-chung over the passage of a lottery bill. For his assault the Taiwan High Court sentenced Lo to either spend 59 days in prison or pay a fine of NT$53,100 (slightly less than US$2,000) in 2001; but, because Taiwanese legislators cannot be arrested or imprisoned, Lo would not face any potential legal consequences until after his term in office ended, in 2002. Lo appealed the conviction, but the appeals judge increased the sentence to five months in prison or the option to pay a NT$135,000 fine (approximately $4,500 US). Because this was his final appeal, Lo decided to pay the fine.

Lo was sent to the legislature's discipline committee in 1999, but the case was dropped because over 2/3 of the committee members chose not to attend. Several other DPP legislators also claimed that Lo had assaulted them, but no evidence could be produced and the alleged assaults did not take place in public.

When interviewed about the many allegations against him in 2000, Lo dismissed them as politically motivated attempts to discredit him, claimed that his opponents lacked any evidence that he had any criminal involvement, and presented himself as an honest businessman who only sought public office at the request of religious leaders who had convinced him that he owed it to society. When asked about his violent actions within the Taiwanese legislature, Lo responded: "When I beat people up, it's because I'm trying to get legislation approved."

On March 28, 2001, Lo slapped, punched, and pulled the hair of a legislator from the Pan-Blue People First Party, Diane Lee, during a meeting of the Education and Culture Committee, after she implied that he had attempted to interfere with the selection of board members for a public educational institution that was experiencing a corruption scandal and called him a "gangster". Lo originally denied that he had assaulted Lee, until a video of the incident (which Lo did not know existed) was shown on Taiwanese television. Lee was hospitalized following the incident with a slight concussion.

Following the public revelations of Lo's assault, he refused to apologize to Lee, but announced that he would take a leave from the legislature for three months beginning 29 March 2001 as a form of self-punishment. This was not viewed as sufficient by most of the other representatives, who passed a censure against him on March 30 recommending a six-month suspension from legislative duties. Following his censure, Lo remained abroad until late 2001.

== Post-political activities ==
=== Legal difficulties ===
Immediately after Lo's term ended (along with his legislative immunity to arrest), on 1 February 2002, prosecutors at the Taiwanese High Court's anti-corruption and anti-organized crime center directed police to arrest Lo, possibly due to fears that delaying his arrest would allow him to flee Taiwan or destroy incriminating evidence. He was first interviewed by the Taipei Prosecutor's Office about suspicions that he had embezzled money from three companies: Taishin Securities (of which he was president); Chinlungtai Co.; and, Li-ta Food Co. He was then sent to the Taipei branch of the Ministry of Justice Investigation Bureau for questioning concerning other suspected criminal activity. Other alleged illegal activity then being investigated included the assault on Diane Lee and an alleged attempt to extort money from the board members of the Jin-wen Institute of Technology. Following his arrest, Lo was detained for four months leading up to his conviction.

Prosecutors alleged that Lo had illegally gained a fortune of NT$1.3 billion (nearly US$44 million) through embezzlement, by taking advantage of his position as a lawmaker, and by working with organized crime to blackmail businessmen from Taiwan, Hong Kong, and mainland China. Prosecutors also presented evidence that Lo had evaded taxes. In early 2002 the Taiwanese president, Chen Shui-bian, announced his intention to “eradicate black gold politics and put the most notorious gangster in northern Taiwan behind bars.” Shortly following this announcement, in June 2002, Lo was indicted on charges of corruption, fraud, usury, forgery, breach of trust, and misappropriation of funds. Prosecutors asked the judge at Lo's trial to give him a 30-year prison sentence.

Lo appealed the decision, and on 25 September 2003 the Taipei District Court reduced his conviction to four years. Lo again appealed, and on 27 April 2006 High Court judges again reduced his sentence to three years and nine months. Lo was granted another appeal, and on 12 August 2008 was cleared of all charges.

24 other people were also charged with crimes related to Lo's case. In 2008 all other defendants received sentences of one to three months, except for Lo's financial manager, Lin Chin-Yuan, who was convicted of breaching the Business Accounting Law and Securities and Exchange Act and ordered to serve three years and two months in prison and pay a fine of NT$10 million (US$330,000).

During the period that Lo was being tried, he attempted to run for government office. In 2004 he ran for a seat in the government of Taipei County, but was forced to pull out of the election. Lo claimed that his decision not to run was because he was asked to do so by his mother, and that it was not related to rumors that he had insufficient campaign funds. The Hualien County Kuomintang approved Lo to run in the 2009 county magistracy election, but the decision was overturned by the KMT Organization and Development Committee. In 2012 Lo ran for a seat in the New Taipei City Government against Diane Lee's brother, Lee Ching-hua, but lost.

=== Conviction and flight ===
On 28 March 2013, Lo was convicted of stock manipulation, money laundering, and insider trading under the Securities and Exchange and Business Accounting Acts. He was given a four-year sentence and fined NT$6 million (US$200,000). Following his trial Lo was released on a NT$10 million (US$330,000) bond, but then failed to report to police on April 24 to begin serving his sentence. The Taipei District Prosecutor's Office received an appeal from Lo, but this was rejected, and the office issued 22 arrest warrants for him and confiscated his bond.

Officials at the Taiwanese Criminal Investigation Bureau believed that he had likely fled to either the United States or Australia (where he has many friends and relatives), or to mainland China (due to his many business investments in Beijing and Shanghai). The Chinese government considers Lo a fugitive, and states that, if arrested, they will deport him to Taiwan. (Mainland China is the most popular destination for Taiwanese fugitives seeking to flee abroad, partially because Chinese authorities have sometimes been reluctant to arrest wealthy criminals from Taiwan, as long as they do not commit crimes in China.) If not arrested, Lo will remain a fugitive until 2030, when the statute of limitations runs out.

Following Lo's disappearance there was speculation in the international media that agents of the Chinese intelligence apparatus had already found him, and would use his connections within the Taiwanese underworld to attempt to influence events in Taiwan. One incident in which Lo's influence was suspected occurred in May 2013, when hundreds of persons reputed to be associated with the Celestial Alliance attempted to simultaneously join the DPP, a party hostile to the Chinese government. After this incident occurred, some journalists covering this event suggested that the Chinese intelligence service had used Lo to influence his subordinates to join the DPP, so that they could influence the party's candidates and policies from within. After investigating the incident, the DPP publicly blamed Lo.

== See also ==
- List of fugitives from justice who disappeared

== Bibliography ==
- Chin, Ko-lin (2003). Heijin: Organized Crime, Business, and Politics in Taiwan. Armonk, N.Y.: Sharpe. ISBN 9780765612199.
