= Joanna Lei =

Taiwanese politician and communicologist

C. Joanna Lei MLY
- 雷倩
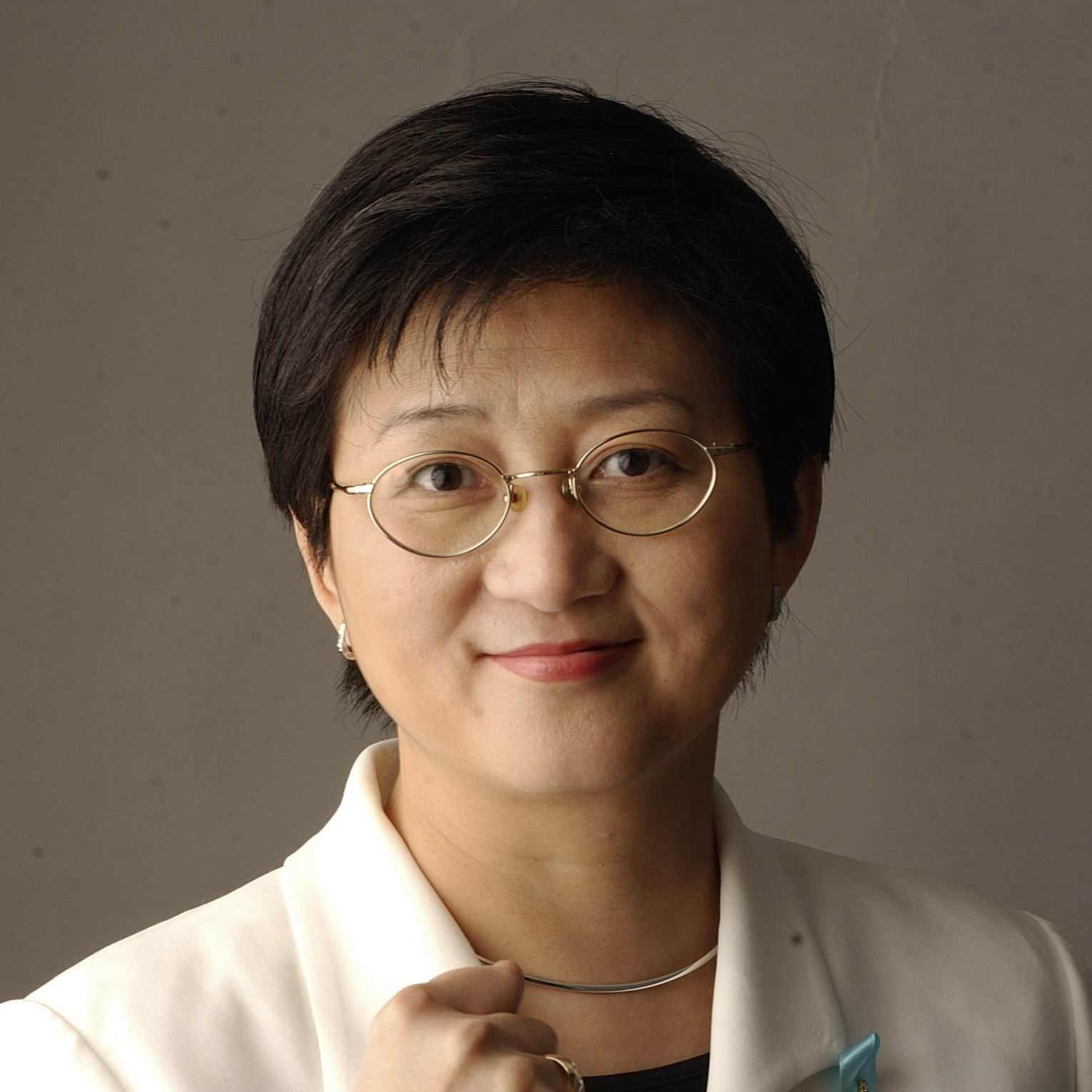
- Lei in 2003

Member of the Legislative Yuan
- In office 1 February 2005 – 1 January 2008
- Constituency: Taipei County 3

Personal details
- Born: Lei Chien (雷倩); 28 November 1958 (age 67) Taipei, Taiwan
- Party: Faith And Hope League (since 2015); Kuomintang (2004–2007); New Party (until 2004; 2007–2011)
- Spouse(s): Peter Lee (李宏志) (divorced) Spencer Chang (張建農) (m. 2006)
- Education: National Taiwan University (BA); University of Pennsylvania (MA, PhD)

Chien Joanna Lei (Chinese: 雷倩; pinyin: Léi Qiàn; born 28 November 1958) is a Taiwanese politician and communicologist who served as a member of the Legislative Yuan from 2005 to 2008.

== Early life and education ==
Lei was born in Taipei on November 28, 1958. Her father is Lei Hsueh-ming, a Republic of China Navy vice admiral who played a prominent role in the La Fayette-class frigate scandal.

After graduating from Taipei First Girls' High School, Lei studied foreign languages and literature as an undergraduate at National Taiwan University and graduated with a bachelor's degree. She then completed doctoral studies in the United States at the University of Pennsylvania, where she earned a Master of Arts (M.A.) and her Ph.D. in 1996, both in mass communications from the Annenberg School for Communication. Her doctoral dissertation, completed under sociologist Charles R. Wright, was titled, "Political orientations and the influences of cohort membership and time: Patterns of change in tolerance, confidence, and the strength of party affiliation".

== Political career ==
Lei, a member of the New Party, was co-nominated by the Kuomintang in the 2004 legislative elections, and won. As a legislator, Lei took an interest in domestic labor and migrant workers. She lost an October 2007 Kuomintang primary, and formally left the party in November. Lei was named a New Party candidate, and lost reelection.

== Later career ==
After stepping down from the Legislative Yuan, Lei became the chair of Kinmen Kaoliang Liquor. She launched an unsuccessful independent bid for the legislature in 2012. In 2015, Lei co-founded the Faith And Hope League, and declared opposition to same-sex marriage in Taiwan. Lei has organized petitions to consider the issue of "family protection" via referendum, while opposing the use of referendums to determine support for same-sex marriage. She stated in 2017 that same-sex marriage would "destroy marriage as we know it. Some places are waiting for Taiwan to set the example. If Taiwan falls, then the rest of Asia will fall." In December 2017, Lei succeeded Cecilia Koo as chair of the National Women's League.
