= Lin Te-fu =

Taiwanese politician

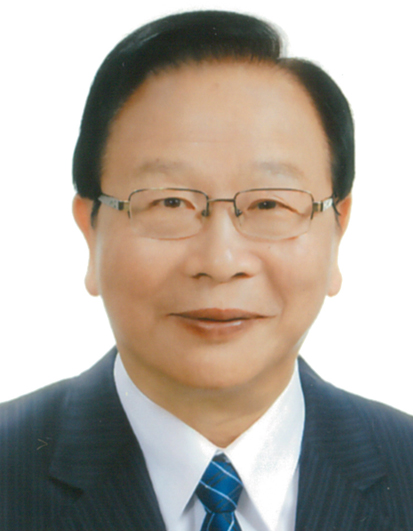
Lin Te-fu

Lin Te-fu (Chinese: 林德福; pinyin: Lín Défú; born 23 October 1953) is a Taiwanese politician. He is a member of the Legislative Yuan for the Chinese Nationalist Party since 2002. He represents the Ninth New Taipei City Constituency.
