= Faith and Hope League =

Faith And Hope League 信心希望聯盟 Xìnxīn xīwàng liánméng
- Abbreviation: FHL
- Chairman: Chen Chih-hung
- Secretary: Joanna Lei
- Founded: 6 September 2015
- Headquarters: Taipei, Taiwan
- Ideology: Christian democracy Social conservatism
- Religion: Christianity
- Colors: Teal and white
- Legislative Yuan: 0 / 113

Website
- fhltw.org

The Faith And Hope League (FHL; Chinese: 信心希望聯盟; pinyin: Xìnxīn xīwàng liánméng) is a Christian political party in Taiwan formed in 2015. The party emerged from the fifth "Conference of National Affairs Forum of Taiwan Pastors" hold by Taiwan Christian Union. The party is led by presidium, consisting of Chen Chih-hung, a pastor of Taiwan Lutheran Church; Joanna Lei, former legislator of New Party; Benson Wang, a businessman and member of Taichung Banner Church; Chung Tung-chieh, pastor of Sanmin Church, a church of the Taiwan Lutheran Church in Kaohsiung; and Chang Hsin-yi, pastor of City Spring of Life Full Gospel Church.

The FHL nominated 16 candidates in the 2016 general election, 10 for Constituencies and 6 party list, but failed to gain any seats.

== Platform ==
The FHL was formed in order to oppose the legalization of same-sex marriage via its counterproposal, a referendum petition that advocated "family protection" by only allowing the husband-wife relationship, consanguinity and familial ethics, and cannot be passed without a national vote.

== History ==
The party was established on 6 September 2015, which is for running the proportional seats in the Legislative Yuan.

== Leadership ==
=== Presidium Terms ===
| Order | Term | Executive chairman | Secretary | Presidium Terms | Assumed office | Left office |
|---|---|---|---|---|---|---|
| 1 | 1 | Chen Chih-hung | Joanna Lei | Chen Chih-hung(陳志宏) Joanna Lei(雷倩); Benson Wang(王秉森); Chung Tung-chieh(莊東傑); Chang Hsin-yi(張信一) | 6 September 2015 | Incumbent |

== Election ==
=== Taiwan legislative election, 2016 ===
| Election | Total seats won | Total votes | Share of votes | Outcome of election | Election leader |
|---|---|---|---|---|---|
| 2016 | 0 / 113 | 206,629 | 1.6951% | 0 seats | Chen Chih-hung |

== See also ==
- Same-sex marriage in Taiwan
- Christian right
- List of political parties in Taiwan
- Politics of the Republic of China
- Referendums in Taiwan
