= New Taipei City Constituency 11 =

Constituency of the Legislative Yuan of Taiwan

- Single-member constituency for the Legislative Yuan
- District(s): Xindian, Shenkeng, Shiding, Pinglin, & Wulai

Current constituency
- Created: 2008
- Member: Lo Ming-tsai (2008–)

New Taipei City Constituency 11 (Chinese: 新北市第十一選舉區; pinyin: Xīnběi Shì Dì-shí-yī Xuǎnjǔ Qū) includes districts in southeastern New Taipei City. The district was formerly known as Taipei County Constituency 11 (2008-2010) and was created in 2008, when all local constituencies of the Legislative Yuan were reorganized to become single-member districts.

== Current district ==
- Xindian
- Shenkeng
- Shiding
- Pinglin
- Wulai

== Legislators ==
Legislator for New Taipei City Constituency 11
Parliament	Years	Member	Party
Constituency split from Taipei Country Constituency 3
7th	2008–2012	Lo Ming-tsai (羅明才)	Kuomintang
8th	2012–2016	Lo Ming-tsai (羅明才)	Kuomintang
9th	2016–2020	Lo Ming-tsai (羅明才)	Kuomintang
10th	2020–2024	Lo Ming-tsai (羅明才)	Kuomintang
11th	2024–present	Lo Ming-tsai (羅明才)	Kuomintang

== Election results ==
=== 2016 ===
Legislative Election 2016: New Taipei City Constituency 11
Party	Candidate	Votes	%	±%
Kuomintang	Lo Ming-tsai	93,962	51.00	
Democratic Progressive	Chen Yung-fu	67,777	36.79	
Others	Tseng Po-yu	22,487	12.21	
Majority		26,185	14.21	
Total valid votes		184,266	97.75	
Rejected ballots		4,236	2.25	
Kuomintang hold		Swing		
Turnout		188,506	66.92	
Registered electors		281,608		

=== 2020 ===
Legislative Election 2020: New Taipei City Constituency 11
Party	Candidate	Votes	%	±%
Kuomintang	Lo Ming-tsai (羅明才)	124,714	58.37	▲7.37
Democratic Progressive	Zhang Mingyou (張銘祐)	73,755	34.52	▼2.27
Statebuilding	Li Xinhan (李欣翰)	7,363	3.45	New
Independent	Liao Zaixing (廖再興)	3,082	1.44	New
United Action Alliance	Liao Lijuan (廖麗娟)	2,806	1.31	New
Labor Party (Taiwan)	Zang Ruxing (臧汝興)	1,414	0.66	New
Chinese Unification Promotion Party	Hu Dagang (胡大剛)	534	0.25	New
Majority		50,959	23.85	▲9.64
Total valid votes		213,668		
Rejected ballots				
Kuomintang hold		Swing	▲4.82	
Turnout				
Registered electors				

=== 2024 ===
Legislative Election 2024: New Taipei City Constituency 11
Party	Candidate	Votes	%	±%
Kuomintang	Lo Ming Tsai	123,399	59.38	▲1.01
Democratic Progressive	Tseng Poyu	76,237	36.68	▲2.16
The People Union Party	Chang Chia-Jen	4,038	1.94	New
Independent	Zheng Tian Quan	2,208	1.06	New
Chinese Women's Party	Chen Shen	1,029	0.50	New
Institutional Island of Saving the World	Wui Chu An	915	0.44	New
Majority		47,162	22.69	▼1.16
Total valid votes		207,826		
Rejected ballots				
Kuomintang hold		Swing	▼0.58	
Turnout				
Registered electors				
