= Chang Ching-chung =

Taiwanese politician (born 1951)

- 張慶忠
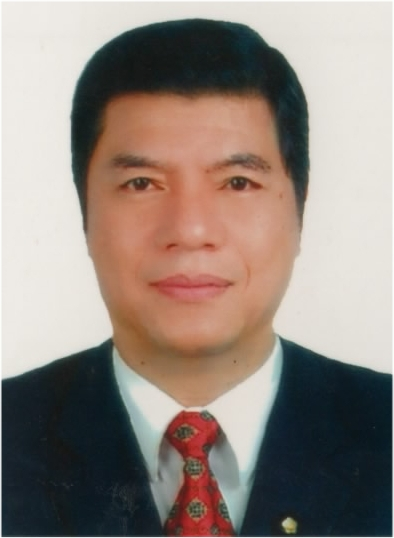

Member of the Legislative Yuan
- In office 1 February 2005 – 31 January 2016
- Preceded by: multi-member district
- Succeeded by: Chiang Yung-chang
- Constituency: Taipei County 3 (2005–2008); New Taipei 8 (2008–2016)

Member of the National Assembly
- In office 1 February 1992 – 1995

Personal details
- Born: 14 December 1951 (age 73)
- Political party: Kuomintang
- Spouse: Chen Ching-ting
- Children: 3 sons, including Chang Chih-lun
- Education: Taipei University of Technology (BS); Chung Hua University (MS)

Chang Ching-chung (Chinese: 張慶忠; born 14 December 1951) is a Taiwanese politician.

== Education ==
Chang attended Chiufen Elementary School in Juifang Township, Taipei County, and moved to Keelung to complete middle school at the Keelung First High School Junior High. He later returned to Juifang, graduating from Juifang Industrial Senior High School. He then studied civil engineering at the Taipei University of Technology, where he earned a Bachelor of Science (B.S.), and subsequently completed a master's degree at Chung Hua University.

== Political career ==
Chang was elected to the second National Assembly, serving from 1992 to 1995, and later served as a three-term member of the Legislative Yuan from 2005 to 2016.

== Personal life ==
Chang Ching-chung is married to Chen Ching-ting, a member of the New Taipei City Council, with whom he raised three sons. For a portion of Chen's tenure on the council, their youngest son Chang Chun-yung was an assistant to his mother. Another son, Chang Chih-lun, ran against Justin Wu in the 2024 legislative election.
