= Chou Chen Hsiu-hsia =

Taiwanese politician

Chou Chen Hsiu-hsia MLY
- 周陳秀霞
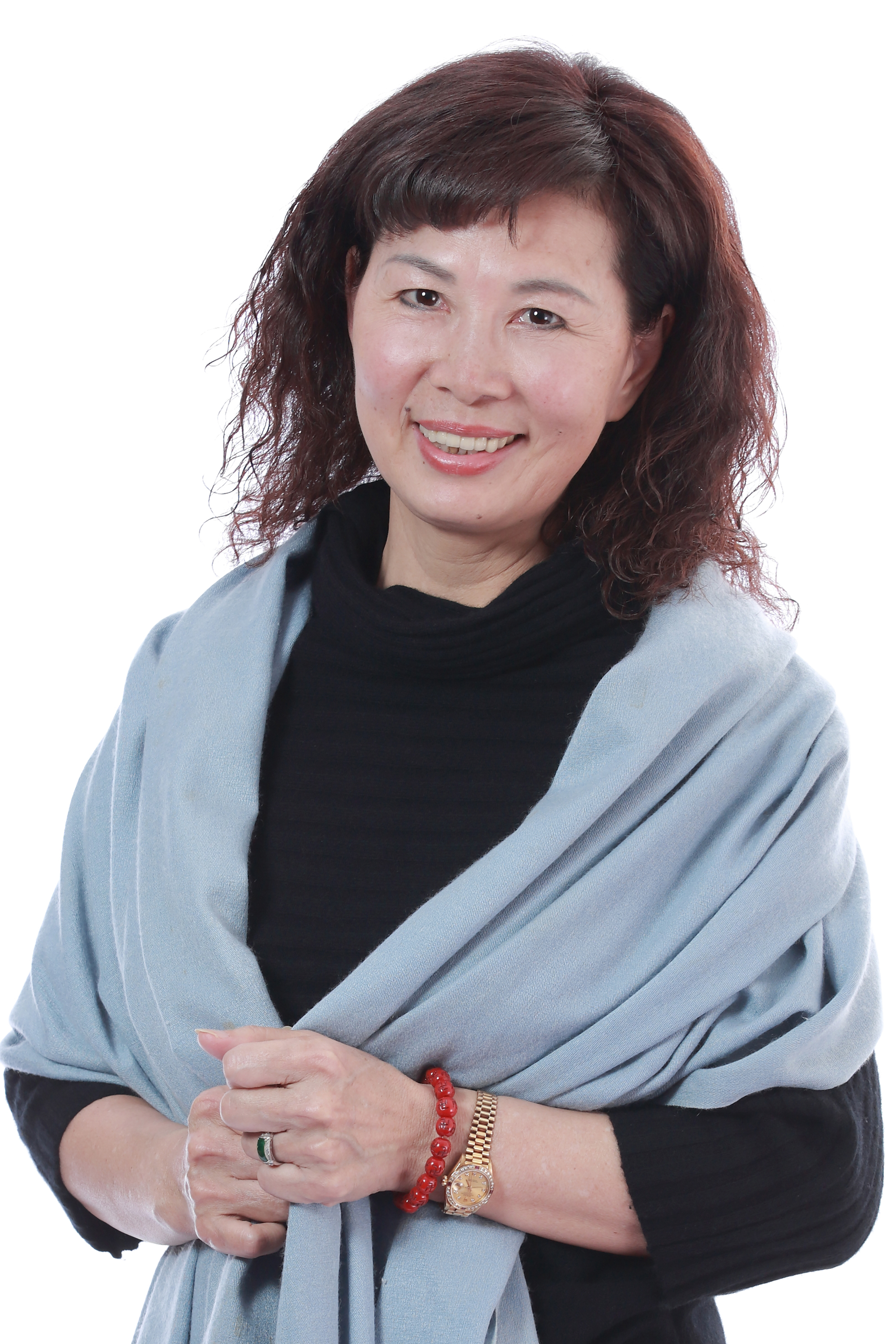

Member of the Legislative Yuan
- In office 1 February 2016 – 31 January 2020
- Constituency: Republic of China

Personal details
- Born: 14 January 1958 (age 68) Tainan, Taiwan
- Party: People First Party

Chou Chen Hsiu-hsia (Chinese: 周陳秀霞; born 14 January 1958) is a Taiwanese politician.

== Education and personal life ==
Chou Chen Hsiu-hsia attended Guantian Junior High School in Guantian, Tainan. She is married to Chou Wu-liu.

== Political career ==
She was elected to the Legislative Yuan via party list proportional representation in 2016, as a member of the People First Party. During her first term in office, Chou Chen took an interest in agriculture and government expenditures. She has been critical of the Transitional Justice Commission.
