= Banking in Taiwan =

Banking in Taiwan began in earnest during the Japanese colonial period however a number of traditional financial institutions were inherited from Taiwan’s diverse colonial and commercial past. Today Taiwan has a modern banking industry and an advanced financial industry.

== History ==
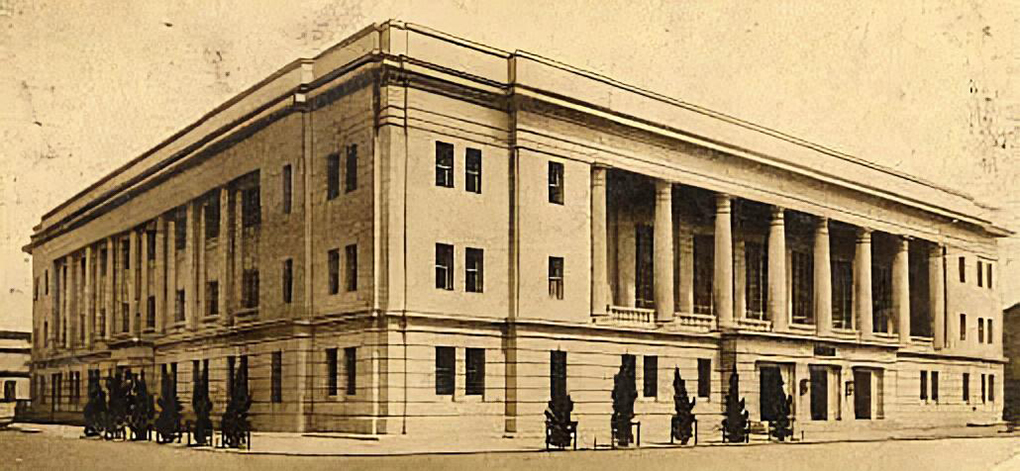
Bank of Taiwan Head Office Building in 1939

Traditional banking in Taiwan was limited to traditional financial institutions. These institutions included silver associations, merchant houses, and remittance houses.

Western style banking was introduced to Taiwan in 1895 by the Japanese colonial authorities. The first modern bank in Taiwan was founded by Osaka Chung Li Bank, the predecessor to Sanwa Bank. In 1896 the Bank of Japan established a branch in Taiwan. In 1897 the Japanese Parliament passed the Taiwanese Banking Law which authorized the creation of the Bank of Taiwan. In 1899 the Bank of Taiwan was authorized to print currency and to serve as the local central bank. By 1908 there were eight western style banks operating in Taiwan.

During the Japanese colonial period these banks did not operate in suburban areas or the country side and for this reason a number of agricultural and fisheries related credit cooperatives societies sprung up at the fringes of the banking industry.

The colonial authorities used the banks to carry out Japanese government policy and to support the militarization of Japan. By 1945 there were 7 major banks operating in Taiwan as well as two major Japanese banks.

In the 1980s the Taiwan Miracle caused foreign cash to flow into Taiwanese banks which created major issues for the sector. In the late 1980s the money supply in Taiwan was expanding at 44% a year, this meant that while Taiwanese families and businesses were highly incentivized to save, there simply were not enough investments available in Taiwan to satisfy all the possible investors. This led the government to liberalize capital controls and allow businesses and individuals to habitually move money outside of the country. At the height of the crisis some banks were turning down large deposits as they could not conceivably lend or invest all the funds.

Liberalization following the cash oversupply crisis allowed an independent Taiwanese financial industry to emerge and existing banks to internationalize.

== Central bank ==
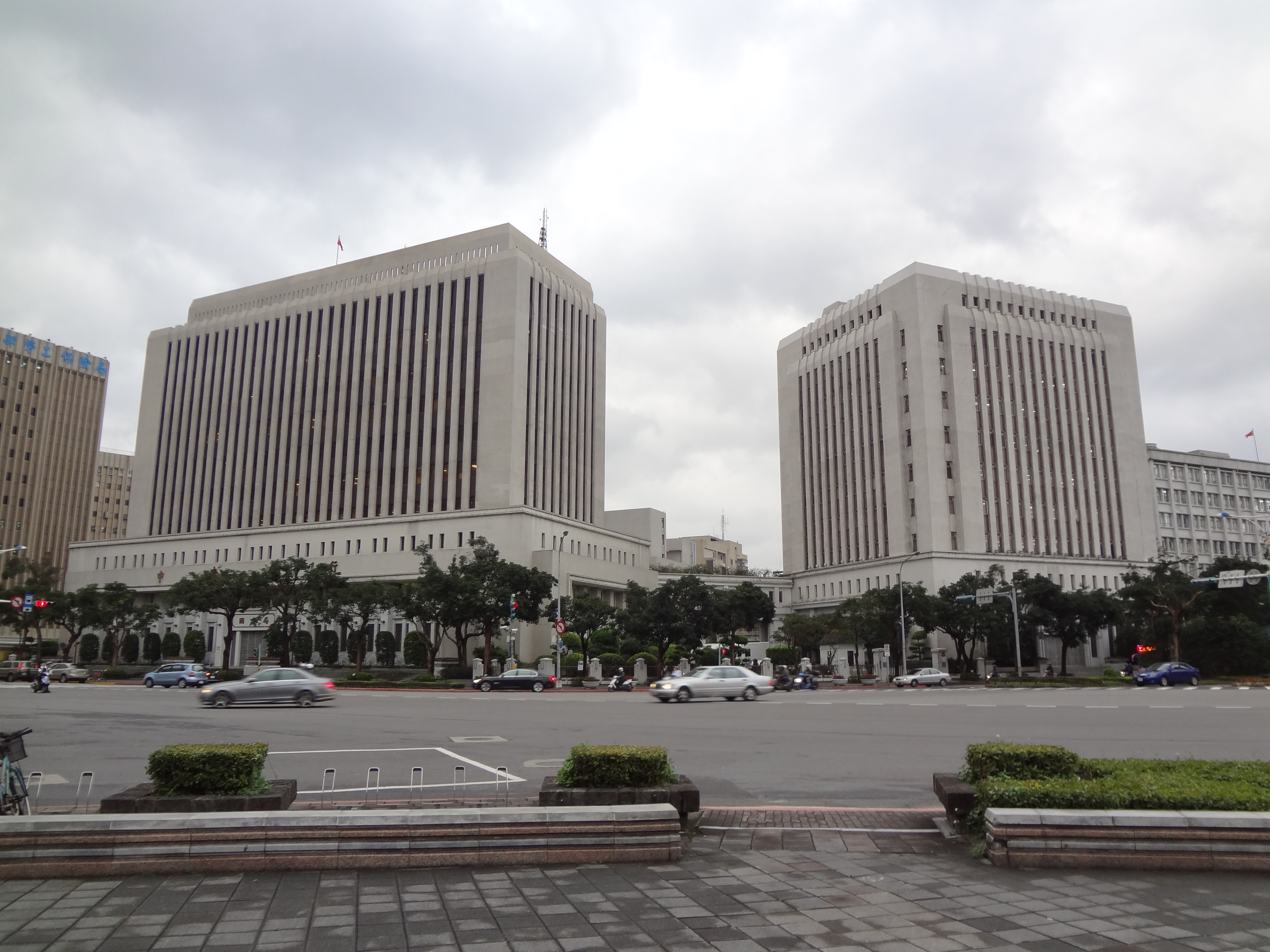
Central Bank of the Republic of China (Taiwan) headquarters in Taipei, Taiwan.

The Central Bank of the Republic of China (Taiwan) has very little independence as it is primarily adherent to current government policy. Its primary concern is the stability of the New Taiwanese Dollar as instability could upset Taiwan's export dominated economy.

== Foreign debt holdings ==
Top 10 according to the Central Bank of the Republic of China (Taiwan)
Rank	Country	Debt held (in billions of USD)
1	United States	84.36
2	China	46.13
3	Hong Kong	37.04
4	Luxembourg	32.02
5	Japan	31.32
6	Australia	22.64
7	Cayman Islands	18.76
8	United Kingdom	18.61
9	Singapore	16.24
10	British West Indies	12.38

== See also ==
- List of banks in Taiwan
