= Hsu Yu-jen =

Taiwanese politician (born 1978)

Hsu Yu-jen MLY
- 許毓仁
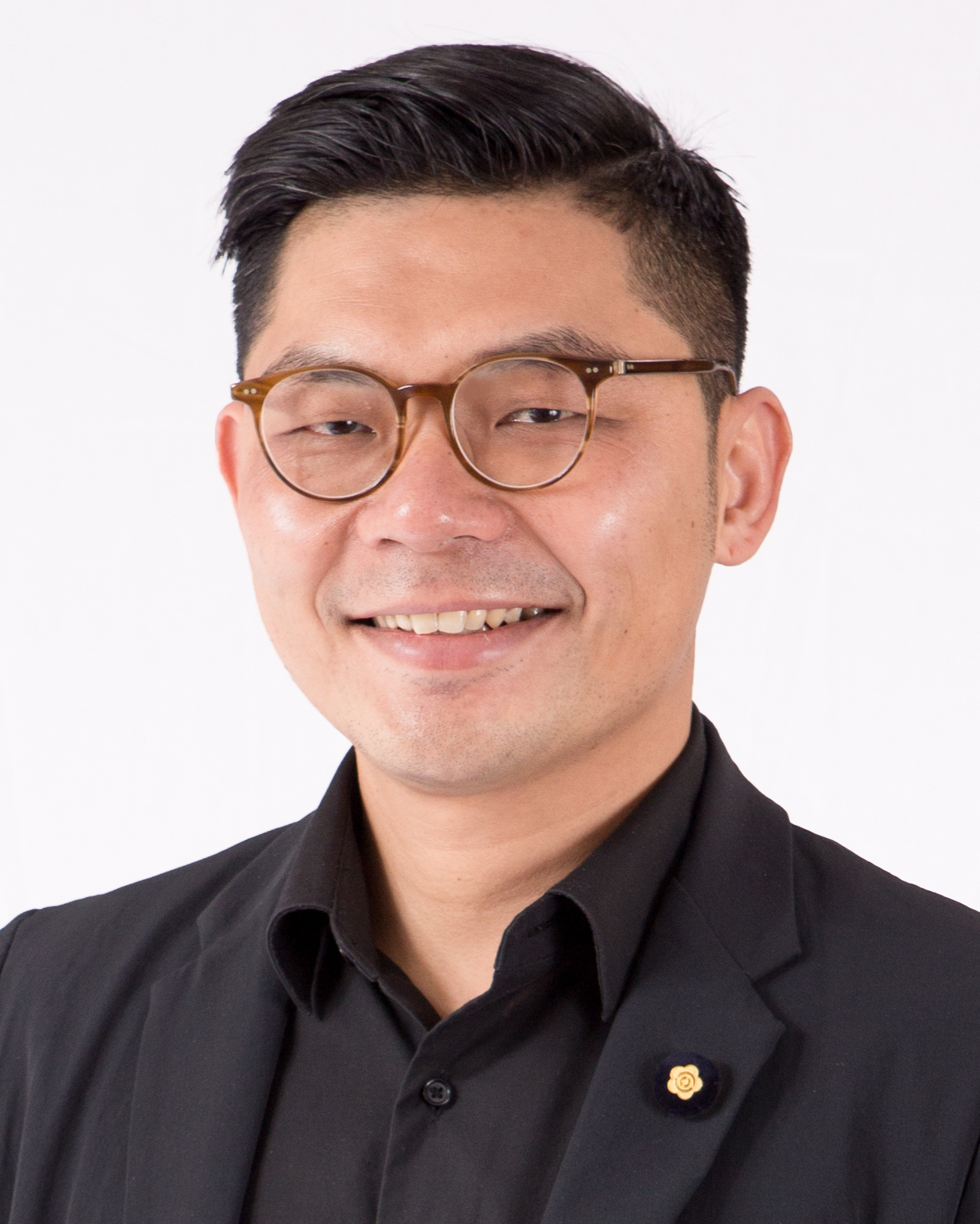

Member of the Legislative Yuan
- Constituency: Republic of China
- In office 1 February 2016 – January 2020

Personal details
- Born: 19 July 1978 (age 47) Kaohsiung, Taiwan
- Party: Kuomintang
- Education: National Chengchi University (BA); Monash University

Hsu Yu-jen (Chinese: 許毓仁; pinyin: Xǔ Yùrén; born 19 July 1985), also known by his English name Jason, is a former Taiwanese politician and basketball executive for Hsinchu Lioneers.

== Early life and education ==
Hsu was born in 1978 in Kaohsiung, Taiwan. As a child, Hsu's parents ran food stalls in a night market. He graduated from National Chengchi University in 2000 with a B.A. in English. During this time, he also studied at Monash University in Melbourne, Australia, as an exchange student. At 23, Hsu traveled across Central and South America, and became a fluent speaker of both English and Spanish.
