= The Motorists' Party of ROC =

The Motorists' Party of ROC 中華民國機車黨 Zhōnghuámínguó jīchēdǎng
- Chairperson: Bryan Dong (董建一)
- Founded: May 2010 (on Facebook); August 2014 (officially registered)
- Headquarters: No.257, Sec. 6, YanPing N. Rd., Shilin District, Taipei, Republic of China
- Political position: Right-wing
- Colours: Purple
- Legislative Yuan: 0 / 113
- Municipal Mayoralties: 0 / 6
- City Mayoralties and County Magistracies: 0 / 16
- Local Councillors: 0 / 906
- Township Chiefs: 0 / 211

Website
- Facebook

The Motorists' Party of ROC (MPR; Chinese: 中華民國機車黨) is a minor political party in Taiwan dedicated to represent motorists and road users. Additionally, its political views, particularly on national identity, are usually considered as pan-Blue.

== History ==
The M.P.R. was formed on Facebook in May 2010 and became an officially registered party in August 2014.

== Ideology ==
M.P.R. is originally and generally to centred on rights of motorists and road users, including pedestrians. Its platform of traffic consists of promotion of motorists' rights, reforms of applying for driving license, improvement of road quality and so forth. Besides, M.P.R. suggests that historically-held University Entrance Examination should be re-introduced and minimum wage should be discussed and risen, etc.

However, its chairperson Bryan Dong (董建一), who represents M.P.R., recognises 1992 Consensus, pursues Chinese unification and is opposed to Taiwan independence movement. M.P.R. advocates joining AIIB and TPP. On the contrary of many minor parties (e.g. Green Party Taiwan), nuclear power is its most preferable method to produce electricity. M.P.R. also holds social-conservative views on several public issues, such as strong support for severe penalties (especially uses of capital punishment for fatal drunken driving and drug trafficking), and opposition to legalisation of same-sex marriage (but support for other types of civil partnership).

== Election result ==
In the 2016 general election, Bryan Dong ran for New Taipei 9th district legislative seat, but failed to defeat incumbent Kuomintang Lin Te-fu (林德福).
