= Yang Chih-yuan (politician) =

Taiwanese political activist (born 1990)

- 楊智淵
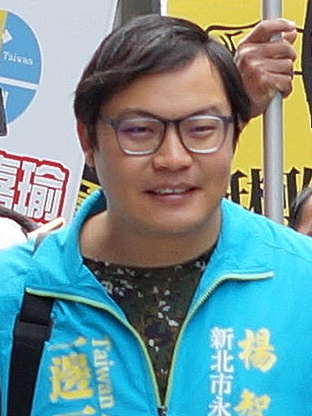
- Yang in 2019

Personal details
- Born: 21 January 1990 (age 36) Taichung, Taiwan
- Party: Independent (since 2020)
- Other political affiliations: Democratic Progressive Party (2008–2009); Taiwanese National Party (2011–2019); Taiwan Action Party Alliance (2019–2020)
- Education: National Chung Hsing University (BA)

Yang Chih-yuan (Note: Chinese: 楊智淵, also romanized as Yang Zhi-yuan or Yang Zhiyuan) (born 21 January 1990) is a Taiwanese political activist. He is one of the founders of the now defunct Taiwanese National Party.

== Biography ==
Yang was born in Taichung.

Yang registered an account on the website of the National Socialism Association in 2006, when he was in middle school.

In 2008, Yang joined the Democratic Progressive Party (DPP) and took part in Wild Strawberries Movement. He quit the DPP in 2009.

In 2014, Yang and his friend Wu Bai-wei formed the "Three Principles of the People Youth League" (三民主義青年團), during which he met and discussed cooperation with Chang An-lo, president of the Chinese Unification Promotion Party, which appeal to Chinese unification. This Youth League shares the same name with Kuomintang's historical youth wing (1938–1947).

In 2020, a 25-year-old woman accused Yang of sexual harassment.

On 3 August 2022, the Chinese ministry of state security detained Yang in Wenzhou, Zhejiang, on suspicion of endangering national security. He was formally arrested on 24 April 2023, and handed a nine-year prison term on 6 September 2024.

Yang was listed as a political prisoner in the U.S. Congressional-Executive Commission on China annual report of 2025.
