= Non-Partisan Solidarity Union =

Political party in Taiwan

Non-Partisan Solidarity Union 無黨團結聯盟
- NPSU logo
- Leader: Lin Pin-kuan
- Founded: 16 June 2004
- Headquarters: Taipei, Taiwan
- Ideology: Third Way
- Political position: Centre
- National affiliation: Pan-Blue Coalition
- Legislative Yuan: 0 / 113
- Municipal mayors: 0 / 6
- Magistrates/mayors: 0 / 16
- Councilors: 7 / 912
- Township/city mayors: 0 / 204

Non-Partisan Solidarity Union
- Traditional Chinese: 無黨團結聯盟
- Simplified Chinese: 无党团结联盟
Transcriptions
Standard Mandarin
- Hanyu Pinyin: Wúdǎng Tuánjié Liánméng
Hakka
- Pha̍k-fa-sṳ: Mò-tóng Thòn-kiet Lièn-mèn
Southern Min
- Hokkien POJ: Bô-tóng Thoân-kiat Liân-bêng
- Tâi-lô: Bô-tóng Thuân-kiat Liân-bîng

The Non-Partisan Solidarity Union (Note: In local languages: Traditional Chinese script: 無黨團結聯盟; Mandarin Pinyin: Wúdǎng Tuánjié Liánméng; Hokkien: Bô-tóng Thoân-kiat Liân-bêng; Sixian Hakka: Mò-tóng Thòn-kiet Lièn-mèn) is a political party in Taiwan. It was established on 16 June 2004, led by founding Chairwoman Chang Po-ya and emerged a major player in the national political scene during the 2004 Legislative Yuan election, with 26 candidates running for local constituency and aboriginal seats, and 6 others nominated for proportional representation seats.

== History ==
At its founding, it was something of a big tent party in that it lacked a central ideology and fielded various candidates who ran more on their personal qualities rather than a well-articulated commonality.

The party won six seats in the 6th Legislative Yuan (2005–2008), three seats in the 7th Legislative Yuan (2008–2012), two seats in the 2012 election and one in the 2016 election.

== Election results ==
=== Legislative elections ===
Election	Total seats won	Total votes	Share of votes	Outcome of election	Election leader
2004	6 / 225	353,164	3.86%	▼5 seats; Opposition (unaligned)	Chang Po-ya
2008	3 / 113	239,317	2.4%	▼3 seats; Opposition (unaligned)	Lin Pin-kuan
2012	2 / 113	148,105	1.12%	▼1 seats; Opposition (unaligned)	Lin Pin-kuan
2016	1 / 113	77,672	0.64%	▼1 seats; Opposition (unaligned)	Lin Pin-kuan

=== Local elections ===
Election	Mayors & Magistrates	Councils	Third-level Municipal heads	Third-level Municipal councils	Fourth-level Village heads	Election Leader
2005	0 / 23	0 / 901	1 / 319	—N/a	—N/a	Chang Po-ya
2006 municipalities only	0 / 2	0 / 96	—N/a	—N/a	—N/a	Chang Po-ya
2009	0 / 17	0 / 587	0 / 211	—N/a	—N/a	Lin Pin-kuan
2010 municipalities only	0 / 5	0 / 314	—N/a	—N/a	0 / 3,757	Lin Pin-kuan
2014 unified	0 / 22	2 / 906	0 / 204	0 / 2,137	0 / 7,836	Lin Pin-kuan
2018 unified	0 / 22	5 / 912	0 / 204	0 / 2,148	0 / 7,744	Lin Pin-kuan
2022 unified	0 / 22	7 / 910	0 / 204	0 / 2,139	0 / 7,748	Lin Pin-kuan

=== National Assembly elections ===
Election	Total seats won	Total votes	Share of votes	Outcome of election	Election leader
2005	2 / 300	25,162	0.65%	▲2 seats; Opposition (Rejecting amendments)	Chang Po-ya

== See also ==
- Politics of the Republic of China
- List of political parties in Taiwan
