= Lin Kuo-cheng (born 1966) =

Taiwanese politician (born 1966)

Lin Kuo-cheng MLY
- 林國正
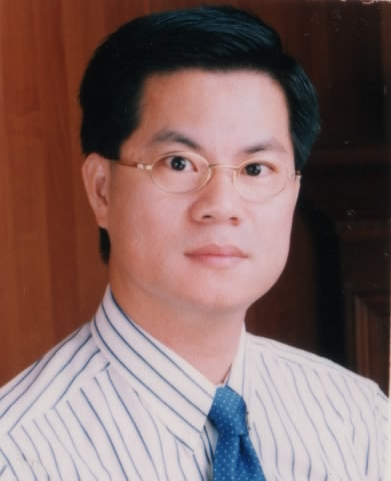

Member of the Legislative Yuan
- In office 1 February 2012 – 31 January 2016
- Preceded by: Kuo Wen-cheng
- Succeeded by: Lai Jui-lung
- Constituency: Kaohsiung 9

Member of the Kaohsiung City Council
- In office 25 December 2002 – 31 January 2012

Personal details
- Born: 26 November 1966 (age 59) Wuqi, Taichung, Taiwan
- Party: Kuomintang
- Education: National Taiwan University (BS); National Central University (MA)

Lin Kuo-cheng (Chinese: 林國正; 26 November 1966) is a Taiwanese politician. He was a member of the Kaohsiung City Council from 2002 to 2012, when he was elected to the Legislative Yuan, on which he served until 2016.

== Early life and education ==
Lin was raised in Wuqi District, Taichung, to a family of fishers. He earned a bachelor's degree in agricultural economics at National Taiwan University and a master's degree in financial management at National Central University.

== Political career ==
=== Kaohsiung City Council ===
Lin was elected to two terms on the Kaohsiung City Council from 2002 to 2010, and served a partial term after Kaohsiung had been named a special municipality. In May 2007, Lin criticized Kaohsiung City Government Education Bureau director Cheng Ying-yao for politicizing education, after the bureau had issued an administrative order stated that city schools should stop using the phrase "commander's podiums" for school podiums. The phrase had been in use since the Kuomintang-led government of the Republic of China assumed control of Taiwan. In October 2007, Lin drew attention to Chi Cheng's suspected violations of hiring regulations in advance of the 2009 World Games to be held in Kaohsiung. In 2008, Lin criticized the city government for removing a flag of the Republic of China in a parade held to mark the one-year period before the games. In May 2009, he opposed a carbon tax proposal for Kaohsiung-based businesses, stating that the tax rates for local businesses should be raised instead. In 2010, Lin opined that the Kaohsiung City Government was not doing enough to improve security on school campuses.

=== Legislative Yuan ===
Lin ran as a Kuomintang candidate in the 2008 Taiwanese legislative election, losing Kaohsiung's fifth district seat in the Legislative Yuan to Democratic Progressive Party candidate Kuo Wen-cheng. Lin was nominated by the Kuomintang to run again in 2012, and won election to the 8th Legislative Yuan, finishing ahead of incumbent lawmaker Kuo and Chen Shui-bian's son Chen Chih-chung, who was contesting the race as political independent.

During Lin's first year in office, he questioned national defense minister Kao Hua-chu on Taiwan's indigenous submarine program. The following year, Lin questioned National Communications Commission head Howard Shyr on the decision to approve a change of board members for Taiwan Broadband Communications, and advocated for the removal of Prosecutor-General Huang Shih-ming from his post after Huang had disclosed classified information. In 2014, Lin drew attention to the unequal distribution of wealth in Taiwan, and commented on the business operations of the Taiwan High Speed Rail Corporation, as well as the gas explosions in Kaohsiung that year. In December 2014, an attempt to recall Lin from his legislative office failed, and he declared his opposition to Mao Chi-kuo's appointment as premier. In 2015, Lin advocated for increased governmental investment in national and cybersecurity and for amendments to the Labor Pension Act. He was critical of governmental ineffectiveness in the aftermath of the TransAsia Airways Flight 235 crash, drawing particular attention to premier Mao Chi-kuo's previous tenure as transportation minister from 2008 to 2013.

=== Later political career ===
Lin was the campaign manager for Kuomintang presidential candidate Han Kuo-yu in the 2020 election.
