= Legislative Yuan constituencies in New Taipei City =

New Taipei City electoral constituencies (Chinese: 新北市選舉區) consist of 12 single-member constituencies, each represented by a member of the Republic of China Legislative Yuan.

== Current constituencies ==
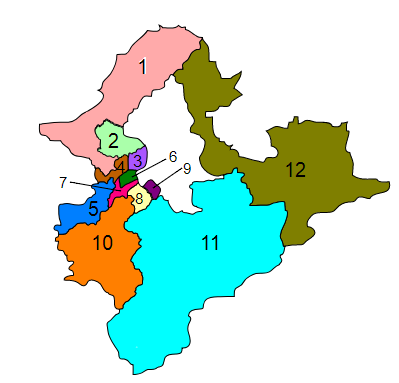
Map of New Taipei City legislative constituencies

- New Taipei City Constituency 1: Shimen, Sanzhi, Tamsui, Bali, Linkou, Taishan
- New Taipei City Constituency 2: Wugu, Luzhou, Sanchong (16 villages)
- New Taipei City Constituency 3: Sanchong (103 villages)
- New Taipei City Constituency 4: Xinzhuang (75 villages)
- New Taipei City Constituency 5: Shulin, Yingge, Xinzhuang (9 villages)
- New Taipei City Constituency 6: West Banqiao (65 villages)
- New Taipei City Constituency 7: East Banqiao (61 villages)
- New Taipei City Constituency 8: Zhonghe (76 villages)
- New Taipei City Constituency 9: Yonghe, Zhonghe (17 villages)
- New Taipei City Constituency 10: Tucheng, Sanxia
- New Taipei City Constituency 11: Xindian, Shenkeng, Shiding, Pinglin, Wulai
- New Taipei City Constituency 12: Xizhi, Jinshan, Wanli, Ruifang, Pingxi, Shuangxi, Gongliao

== Legislators ==
Kuomintang Democratic Progressive Party New Power Party

Election	1	2	3	4	5	6	7	8	9	10	11	12
2008 7th	Wu Yu-sheng	Lin Shu-fen	Yu Tian	Lee Hung-chun	Huang Chih-hsiung	Lin Hung-chih	Wu Chin-chih	Chang Ching-chung	Lin Te-fu	Lu Chia-chen	Lo Ming-tsai	Lee Ching-hua
2012 8th	Wu Yu-sheng	Lin Shu-fen	Gao Jyh-peng (2012-2018)^{1}	Lee Hung-chun	Huang Chih-hsiung	Lin Hung-chih	Chiang Huei-chen	Chang Ching-chung	Lin Te-fu	Lu Chia-chen	Lo Ming-tsai	Lee Ching-hua
2016 9th	Lu Sun-ling	Lin Shu-fen	Gao Jyh-peng (2012-2018)^{1}	Wu Ping-jui	Su Chiao-hui	Chang Hung-lu	Lo Chih-cheng	Chiang Yung-chang	Lin Te-fu	Wu Chi-ming	Lo Ming-tsai	Huang Kuo-chang
2019 by-election	Lu Sun-ling	Lin Shu-fen	Yu Tian	Wu Ping-jui	Su Chiao-hui	Chang Hung-lu	Lo Chih-cheng	Chiang Yung-chang	Lin Te-fu	Wu Chi-ming	Lo Ming-tsai	Huang Kuo-chang
2020 10th	Hung Mong-kai	Lin Shu-fen	Yu Tian	Wu Ping-jui	Su Chiao-hui	Chang Hung-lu	Lo Chih-cheng	Chiang Yung-chang	Lin Te-fu	Wu Chi-ming	Lo Ming-tsai	Lai Pin-yu
2024 11th	Hung Mong-kai	Lin Shu-fen	Lee Kuen-cheng	Wu Ping-jui	Su Chiao-hui	Chang Hung-lu	Yeh Yuan-chih	Chang Chih-lun	Lin Te-fu	Wu Chi-ming	Lo Ming-tsai	Liao Hsien-hsiang

Gao Jyh-peng resigned in 2018 due to a corruption sentence.

== Election results ==
=== 2016 ===
2016 legislative election
		Elected			Runner-up		
Incumbent	Constituency	Candidate	Party	Votes (%)	Candidate	Party	Votes (%)
Kuomintang; Wu Yu-sheng	1	Lu Sun-ling	DPP	53.28%	Wu Yu-sheng	Kuomintang	40.88%
DPP; Lin Shu-fen	2	Lin Shu-fen	DPP	68.75%	Chen Ming-yi	Kuomintang	31.25%
DPP; Gao Jyh-peng	3	Gao Jyh-peng	DPP	54.54%	Li Chien-lung	Kuomintang	35.43%
Kuomintang; Lee Hung-chun	4	Wu Ping-jui	DPP	62.98%	Chen Mao-chia	Kuomintang	29.40%
Kuomintang; Huang Chih-hsiung	5	Su Chiao-hui	DPP	56.11%	Huang Chih-hsiung	Kuomintang	40.77%
Kuomintang; Lin Hung-chih	6	Chang Hung-lu	DPP	52.61%	Lin Kuo-chun	Kuomintang	39.55%
Kuomintang; Chiang Huei-chen	7	Lo Chih-cheng	DPP	53.61%	Chiang Huei-chen	Kuomintang	39.84%
Kuomintang; Chang Ching-chung	8	Chiang Yung-chang	DPP	53.67%	Chang Ching-chung	Kuomintang	40.43%
Kuomintang; Lin Te-fu	9	Lin Te-fu	Kuomintang	52.43%	Lee Hsing-chang	Independent	29.56%
Kuomintang; Lu Chia-chen	10	Wu Chi-ming	DPP	58.50%	Lu Chia-chen	Kuomintang	38.46%
Kuomintang; Lo Ming-tsai	11	Lo Ming-tsai	Kuomintang	51.00%	Chen Yong-fu	DPP	36.79%
Kuomintang; Lee Ching-hua	12	Huang Kuo-chang	New Power Party	51.52%	Lee Ching-hua	Kuomintang	43.72%

=== 2019 By-election ===
2019 legislative By-election
		Elected			Runner-up		
Incumbent	Constituency	Candidate	Party	Votes (%)	Candidate	Party	Votes (%)
DPP; Gao Jyh-peng	3	Yu Tian	DPP	52.04%	Cheng Shih-wei	Kuomintang	46.77%
