= Wanhua teahouse COVID-19 cluster outbreak =

2021 disease outbreak in Taiwan

- Disease: COVID-19
- Pathogen: Alpha (B.1.1.7)
- Location: China (Taiwan)
- Index case: April 23, 2021
- Confirmed cases: Confirmed cases (as of June 2, 2021): 877 (teahouse-related cases only) 640 (Wanhua District cases only) 1,772 (cases related to Wanhua activity history) 3,289 (total)

In late April 2021, multiple areas in regions of Taiwan experienced COVID-19 disease clusters, which subsequently spread across Taiwan. This event was part of the COVID-19 pandemic in Taiwan.

On May 13, 2021, genomic sequencing revealed that the cluster cases in Luodong Township, Yilan County; Luzhou District, New Taipei City; and Wanhua District, Taipei City shared the same viral lineage as the China Airlines Novotel COVID-19 cluster incident, all belonging to the B.1.1.7 lineage variant of SARS-CoV-2. The Central Epidemic Command Center (CECC) assessed that these clusters might be related, but no direct epidemiological links had yet been identified.

On May 14, 2021, according to case diagrams released by the CECC, a total of 64 confirmed cases were reported (9 cases from the Yilan amusement arcade cluster, 25 cases from the Luzhou Lions Clubs International, 23 cases related to Wanhua teahouses, and 7 cases with sources under investigation). As the number of confirmed COVID-19 cases increased rapidly and spread across multiple counties and cities, the CECC announced on 19 May 2021 that Taiwan would enter a nationwide Level 3 COVID-19 alert. On May 26, although the Level 3 alert had originally been scheduled to be lifted on May 28, due to the increasingly severe domestic outbreak and to reduce the risk of cluster infections, the CECC announced for the first time that the alert would be extended until June 14. On June 7, the CECC again announced an extension of the Level 3 alert to June 28 due to the continued severity of the outbreak. On June 23, the CECC extended the nationwide Level 3 alert for a third time to July 12. On July 8, the CECC extended the Level 3 alert for a fourth time to July 26, while also moderately easing some restrictions starting July 13. On July 23, after considering the domestic situation and referencing international epidemic control adjustments, and following consultations with local governments, the CECC announced that the epidemic alert level would be lowered to Level 2 from July 27 to August 9 (subject to adjustment depending on the situation). Subsequently, the Level 2 alert remained in place until December 31, 2021.

On August 13, 2021, the CECC used four charts to conclude that the "3+11" policy constituted a cluster event rather than a breach, and that no link between the Novotel and Wanhua incidents could be confirmed after three months. "After three and a half months of extensive investigation, no evidence linking the cases to the community was found, although fewer connections are preferable. The Novotel hotel cluster ‘should have originated from abroad,’ but the transmission relationships involving housekeeping staff and others remain difficult to clarify; it can only be said that during that period, infections occurred among both employees and residents within Novotel." "Following yesterday’s statement that the ‘3+11’ system was not a breach, public criticism arose. Some netizens questioned, ‘Could it be that a wormhole dropped the virus into Wanhua?’ When asked by the media about this view, Chen Shih-chung stated that at the time the incident had just subsided, it was not possible to assert that there was no connection, especially since some genomic sequences were identical, making it impossible to rule out community links in the short term. However, after more than three months of extensive epidemiological investigation and testing, no connections were found, leading to the conclusion that they were separate events. When further asked whether it could be concluded that the China Airlines Novotel cluster had no direct relation to the domestic outbreak, Chen responded, ‘There is no way to assert that definitively; I can only present the relevant circumstances. At least, there is no evidence indicating a connection.’"

== Background ==
In April 2020, Taipei City councilors and media reported that nearly 400 teahouses and tea rooms (colloquially referred to as "grandpa shops") in Wanhua were small in space yet crowded with hostesses and customers, significantly increasing the risk of droplet transmission of COVID-19. The indoor 1.5-meter social distancing guideline was effectively disregarded, and people were not wearing masks, raising concerns that the lack of regulation could become a major breach in epidemic prevention.

In May 2020, citizens also filed complaints with the Taipei City Department of Health ，reporting that teahouse private rooms in Wanhua were overcrowded and failed to maintain safe social distancing. If not strictly investigated, they warned, this could create a breach in epidemic prevention. The department merely responded that establishments not complying with preventive measures would be guided to make improvements within a specified period, and the case was considered handled. This response was criticized for ignoring whistleblower warnings and leading to a prevention gap. Furthermore, within a 100-meter radius of the area was Renji hospital, and under the "Taipei City Self-Government Ordinance on the Management of Dance Halls, Cabarets, Bars, and Special Coffee and Tea Rooms," such establishments were not permitted. However, the city government had long failed to actively crack down on businesses whose operations did not match their registered categories.

Although in this cluster case (Case No. 1424), the onset date could be traced back to April 23, 2021 (with the actual infection likely occurring earlier and considered possibly parallel to the China Airlines and Novotel cluster incidents as two separate developments), later, CECC Deputy Chief of the Medical Response Division Lo Yi-chun stated that genomic sequencing showed that 17 cases in the China Airlines Novotel COVID-19 cluster incident shared the same primary UK variant strain, while 11 cases from a New Taipei Lions Club cluster, 5 cases from the Wanhua teahouse cluster, and 1 case from a Yilan amusement venue were all infected with this UK variant. However, on May 11, seven locally transmitted cases appeared, among which Case No. 1203 was identified as the first confirmed case, marking an escalation in the alert status of the Wanhua teahouse outbreak.

In May 2021, New Taipei City councilor Yeh Yuan-chih revealed: "Novotel only provided Building 2 for quarantine guests, but half a year ago, due to insufficient rooms, it secretly opened Building 1 to quarantine guests, creating a breach in epidemic prevention! The hotel has not responded!" In response, CECC Commander Chen Shih-chung stated: "Quarantine hotels can be used together with regular hotel operations, but they must be separated by floors and have independent elevators; failure to implement this will result in penalties according to regulations!" He also stated, "They should have reported the situation to us at that time; we will further inquire about it." Yeh responded, "I think it’s strange for Chen Shih-chung to blame employees; whose responsibility is this? It should be Chen Shih-chung’s responsibility, so there’s no need to shift blame." In response to the allegation, Taoyuan City Tourism Bureau Director Yang Sheng-ping stated that no such complaint had been received.

On May 8, the Taoyuan City Department of Health fined the Novotel Hotel NT$1,266,000 for violations, as it had not applied to operate as a quarantine hotel but had designated some floors for airline crew quarantine accommodation, and had allowed mixed occupancy with general guests on the same floor.

On May 13, CECC Commander Chen Shih-chung stated that the cause of the outbreak was due to "connections between people," which led to this breach in epidemic prevention.On the same day, Taipei Mayor Ko Wen-je ordered that 172 teahouses and establishments serving alcohol (commonly known as "grandpa shops" or "qingcha shops") under the jurisdiction of the Wanhua Precinct be closed for three days starting immediately. They could only apply to reopen after disinfection and passing inspections.

On May 17, Chang Shang-chun stated that genomic sequencing analysis indicated that confirmed cases all shared the same viral strain sequence, suggesting a single transmission chain detected at different locations, representing a large community cluster in Taiwan rather than multiple parallel transmission chains. Based on current data, all cases share the same viral sequence, reasonably indicating a single transmission chain detected in different locations; tracing further back shows connections among confirmed individuals, so it cannot be described as three parallel chains.

On May 23, Chen Shih-chung stated that identical genomic sequencing results do not necessarily indicate a connection with the China Airlines incident, and further investigation is required to determine the source.

On June 16, Chen Shih-chung stated that most of this wave of local infections involved the UK variant strain.

On May 21, Control Yuan member Lin Kuo-ming, in light of the outbreak, initiated an automatic investigation into the long-term operation of Wanhua teahouses that engaged in hostess-accompanied drinking services inconsistent with their registered business categories. The competent authorities had failed to actively crack down on these long-term illegal operations, allowing them to become a breach in epidemic prevention (archived page available via the Internet Archive).

On August 13, 2021, the CECC used four charts to conclude that "3+11" was a cluster rather than a breach (as mentioned above), and that no connection between Novotel and Wanhua could be found after three months. The reason for initially suggesting a connection with the Novotel pilot cluster and later stating otherwise was that the Novotel housekeeping manager (Case No. 1120) had already exhibited symptoms such as cough, runny nose, loss of appetite, and shortness of breath starting April 17. Between April 19 and 26, the individual visited clinics multiple times, and as symptoms did not improve, sought hospital care on April 27, was diagnosed with pneumonia, admitted for isolation, tested, and confirmed positive on April 29. During this period, only airline pilots were required to undergo regular screening; other occupations were not included, and quarantine hotel staff (Case No. 1120) were therefore not subject to regular testing. From symptom onset to confirmation, more than 11 days elapsed, during which the individual commuted daily via public transportation between their residence in northern Taiwan and the Taoyuan Novotel Hotel. Therefore, based on available evidence, it cannot be determined whether the housekeeping staff member was infected within Novotel and then transmitted the virus to pilots, or was infected in the community and subsequently brought it into the hotel.

On April 28, 2021, one day before the announcement of Case No. 1120, CECC expert Huang Li-min stated in an interview: "The CECC should not only test pilots but should also adopt expanded testing similar to that used in the Taoyuan General Hospital outbreak, including contractors, cleaning staff, and others with business interactions with China Airlines. Environmental contacts should also undergo serological testing to determine the scale of infection." He further stated, "Preliminary serological results suggest that the virus has been present in Taiwan for a long time and has not disappeared. The Indonesian pilot was only diagnosed after testing in Australia, indicating that this was not the first wave of infection. A large proportion of the China Airlines pilot infections were likely local, with only a minority being imported cases, and there were multiple sources of infection. However, due to the lack of comprehensive serological investigation and gaps in the data, it has been difficult to trace the sources."

== Impact ==
On May 26, according to updated information, the nationwide Level 3 epidemic alert implementation period was continuously extended. All schools at every level across Taiwan, including public and private kindergartens (as well as after-school care centers, cram schools, and child after-school care institutions), were required to suspend in-person classes. The originally scheduled lifting of restrictions on May 28 was postponed to June 14.

=== Regional school suspensions ===
Keelung City:

On May 17, Keelung Mayor Lin Yu-chang announced that senior high school and junior high school third-year students citywide would suspend classes starting May 18 and switch to home-based and remote learning.

Taipei City:

On May 14, the president of Mackay Junior College of Medicine, Nursing and Management, whose campus is located in the Taipei–New Taipei area, issued a "Letter to Parents" on the school website confirming a COVID-19 case at the Sanzhi campus. In accordance with regulations, the entire school suspended classes for two weeks from May 15 to May 29, resuming operations on May 30.

On May 16, Taipei Mayor Ko Wen-je announced at a press conference that third-year junior high and senior high students in the Taipei–New Taipei area would suspend classes starting May 17. Four elementary schools within the Wanhua alert zone—Laosong, Longshan, Shuangyuan, and Yingqiao—were suspended for one week from May 17 to May 23.

On May 17, an art teacher at the affiliated kindergarten of Guangren Elementary School in Wanhua District was confirmed infected. The school announced on the evening of May 16 that both the elementary school and kindergarten would suspend classes for two weeks starting May 17. At 10:30 a.m., Taipei Mayor Ko Wen-je further announced that from May 18 to May 28, all educational institutions below senior high school level in Taipei City (including public and private senior high schools, vocational schools, junior high schools, elementary schools, kindergartens, cram schools, after-school care centers, and infant care centers) would fully suspend in-person classes.

New Taipei City:

On May 15, the president of Cardinal Tien College of Healthcare and Management, whose campuses are located in New Taipei City and Yilan County, announced that distance learning would be implemented from May 15 to May 23.

On May 16, Hou Yu-ih Mayor of New Taipei announced that starting May 17, third-year junior high and senior high students could "stay at home instead of attending school," switching to remote learning. Teachers could teach from alternative locations or online as needed. In response to a confirmed case involving a student at National Taiwan University of Arts, the school’s epidemic prevention task force had already decided on May 14 to implement fully online teaching for all courses from May 17 to June 8 (three weeks). Depending on course nature (e.g., performances or practical courses), teaching methods could be adjusted or postponed, with make-up classes to be completed by June 30. Further adjustments would be made based on the epidemic situation.

On May 17, at approximately 11:00 a.m., Hou Yu-ih announced that from May 18 to May 28, all public and private high schools, junior high schools, elementary schools, kindergartens, cram schools, and after-school care centers in New Taipei City would implement "suspension of classes without suspension of learning," with students staying home for epidemic prevention.

Taoyuan City:

On May 13, due to a confirmed case involving a family member of a sixth-grade elementary student, the school announced a two-week suspension from May 14 to May 30.

On May 16, a Taoyuan resident who had visited Wanhua with two children (one junior high school student and one elementary school student) resulted in three confirmed cases. The schools attended by the two students issued urgent announcements that evening, suspending classes from May 17 to May 30 (two weeks).

Hsinchu County:

On May 16, three confirmed cases were reported in the area, including two children from private kindergartens. The two kindergartens suspended classes for 14 days starting May 17.

Miaoli County:

On May 16, it was confirmed that a ninth-grade student atMiaoli County Dalun Junior High School had taken a Tze-Chiang Limited Express train from Taipei on May 14 and had been in the same carriage as a confirmed COVID-19 case from Tainan. The student was subsequently placed under home quarantine.

The school issued a suspension notice, with the student’s class suspended for 14 days from May 17 to May 30. Arrangements for make-up classes would be announced separately.

Taichung City:

On May 16, the Taichung City Government stated that, based on the latest epidemiological investigation, a sixth-grade student at Chongqing Elementary School in Xitun District was confirmed infected. The Education Bureau, Taichung City Government immediately notified the school to suspend classes from May 17 to May 31 (two weeks), with teaching conducted via video. Further extensions would be considered depending on the situation. This was the third confirmed case in this wave in Taichung, and the school was the first in the city to suspend classes.

Changhua County:

On May 16, health authorities reported 13 new cases, including two classmates from Changtai Junior High School. To protect the health and safety of students and staff, the Changhua County Government urgently announced that the entire school would suspend classes for two weeks starting May 17.

Chiayi County:

On May 16, Chiayi City Government Education Director Lin Li-sheng stated that all junior high and elementary schools and indoor sports facilities in the area would not be open for external use under the Level 2 alert (starting May 16). Parents and visitors were generally not allowed to enter campuses. If entry was necessary, mask-wearing and contact registration were strictly required. To support student learning, the department established an online "epidemic prevention home learning resources" platform to provide online learning for all grades, ensuring that learning would not be interrupted by class suspensions.

Tainan City:

On May 16, Tainan Mayor Huang Wei-che announced that starting May 17, graduating classes (third-year senior high and junior high students) would not be fully suspended. Students with individual needs could take leave with parental consent and not attend school.

Yilan County:

On May 16, Yilan County Magistrate Lin Zi-miao announced that third-year junior high and senior high students could choose not to attend school starting May 17, switching to online learning. The county government also implemented home-based and remote work, reducing staff from 800 to 500, expanding flexible working hours, and suspending all public memorial ceremonies until May 28.

=== Student return migration ===
On May 15, as the epidemic alert level in Taipei and New Taipei was raised from Level 2 to Level 3, the region became a major outbreak area. Nearly 400,000 university students (including approximately 370,000 from universities and technical colleges) studying in the area faced the dilemma of whether to return to their hometowns outside the region.

On May 18, many students whose homes were in Taichung began returning. Taichung Mayor Lu Shiow-yen estimated that approximately 10% to 20% of university students from northern institutions had returned to central Taiwan, as most northern universities had suspended classes and shifted to online teaching.

=== Suspension of graduation ceremonies ===
On May 24, the Ministry of Education issued a directive to all senior high schools and below, stating that "the epidemic remains severe," and requesting that graduation ceremonies be suspended. If ceremonies had to be held, they should be conducted online to avoid unnecessary movement, activities, or gatherings.

=== Extension of nationwide suspension and control period ===
On June 7, in response to the epidemic, the Ministry of Education announced that the nationwide Level 3 alert would be extended to June 28. To reduce the risk of cluster infections and safeguard the health and learning rights of students and staff, and considering the integrity of the academic semester, it was further announced that "the suspension of in-person classes for all schools and public and private kindergartens nationwide for the second semester of the 2020 academic year would be extended to July 2 (closing ceremony for schools below senior high level)." Students would continue learning from home via online methods. After-school care centers, cram schools, and other educational institutions were also requested to have all students remain at home and study online.

=== Transportation capacity ===
Taichung City:

Taichung Metro (Green Line):

On May 13 (Thursday), affected by the domestic outbreak, ridership dropped to 18,948 (a decrease of approximately 24.52% compared to 25,012 on the same day the previous week). On May 14 (Friday), ridership was 24,085.On 15 May (Saturday), the daily ridership of the Green line (Taichung MRT) was 12,849 passengers.On May 16 (Sunday), ridership dropped to 7,721, the lowest since official operations began on April 25.

Lienchiang County:

On May 17, government-subsidized ferry routes ("Fuao to Daqiu" and "Beigan Qiaozi to Daqiu") were announced to be suspended from May 18 to May 28, with resumption depending on the epidemic situation.

=== Conversion, postponement, or cancellation of regional activities ===
Ministry of Finance:

On May 15, due to the severe domestic outbreak, the Ministry of Finance announced that National Taxation Bureau offices in Taipei, New Taipei, Keelung, Taoyuan, and Yilan would suspend in-person income tax filing services to comply with the Level 3 alert measures in Taipei and New Taipei (May 15–May 28).

Supreme Court:

A preparatory civil hearing scheduled for May 21 at 3:00 p.m. in the Third Civil Division of the Supreme Court was canceled due to the large number of participants, many of whom were elderly individuals residing in Taoyuan (Taiwan RCA pollution case and Thomson labor injury retrial appeal cases). The hearing would be rescheduled after the epidemic situation improved.

=== Temporary closure of leisure and entertainment venues and businesses ===
Chiayi County:

On May 15, as the epidemic alert was raised to quasi-Level 3, authorities conducted inspections over two consecutive days. A total of 224 businesses suspended operations in accordance with regulations; a few that remained open ceased operations after guidance.

Keelung City:

On May 17, Keelung Mayor Lin Yu-chang announced (following an earlier announcement by the Miaokou Night Market committee on May 16) that the Keelung Miaokou Night Market would suspend operations from 6:00 p.m. on May 17 to 4:00 p.m. on May 23. The committee stated that the closure was to cooperate with government epidemic prevention measures, environmental cleaning, and disinfection, with reopening expected on May 24.

Lienchiang County:

On May 18, following a surge in cancellations and full refunds by Dongyin homestay operators, local businesses collectively decided to voluntarily suspend operations from May 18 to June 8.

=== Temporary closure of scenic areas ===
Keelung City:

On May 14, Keelung Islet was closed for one month starting May 14, with reopening expected on June 15.

Hsinchu County:

On May 16, the Smangus tribe voluntarily suspended operations until June 8.

Wufeng Township (average elevation 1,282 meters) implemented measures such as mountain closure and closure of tourist and camping areas to prevent epidemic breaches caused by incoming visitors.

Miaoli County:

Nanzhuang Township (average elevation 865 meters) adopted similar measures, including mountain closure and closure of tourist and camping areas. For example, the Luchang tribe decided on May 17 to close the mountains from May 19 to June 8.

Nantou County:

On May 16, the county government announced that Shuanglong Waterfall and the Rainbow Suspension Bridge Park would be closed until May 23.

Pingtung County:

On May 16, nearly 80% of tourism, accommodation, and catering businesses in Liuqiu Township voluntarily suspended operations and canceled bookings until June 8 to protect the area.

Mountain tribes in Pingtung temporarily closed access, requesting tourists not to visit until the epidemic subsided. For example, the Rinari tribal settlement (including Dashe Village in Sandimen Township, Haocha Village in Wutai Township, and Majia Village in Majia Township) suspended accommodation and dining services until June 8.

Taitung County:

On May 17, the Bunun tribe in Lidao (known as guardians of Jiaming Lake) held a meeting and decided to close access to Jiaming Lake, Jiemao Si, and Lisong Hot Springs starting immediately.

On May 16, approximately 80% of Green Island’s homestays, tourist hotels, and restaurants voluntarily stopped accepting visitors and jointly requested island closure. Some businesses in Lanyu also canceled bookings and considered closure. As of May 18, Lanyu decided not to close the island but to suspend receiving tourists.

Penghu County:

On May 16, Penghu County Magistrate Lai Feng-wei, concerned about the spread of the epidemic to offshore islands, called on accommodation providers to stop accepting new bookings to reduce infection risk and cross-regional movement.

=== Serological antibody study of blood donors ===
On August 23, to strengthen monitoring and prevent the spread of the Delta variant, the Centers for Disease Control initiated a serological antibody (seroprevalence) study among blood donors. The results would be used as a reference for epidemic prevention policies and for assessing transmission risks in blood donation and transfusion. A total of 5,000 archived serum samples collected between April 25 and July 3 were randomly selected from blood donation centers across Taiwan to test for SARS-CoV-2 nucleocapsid and spike protein antibodies.
