= Liao Pen-yen =

Taiwanese politician (born 1956)

Liao Pen-yen MLY
- 廖本煙
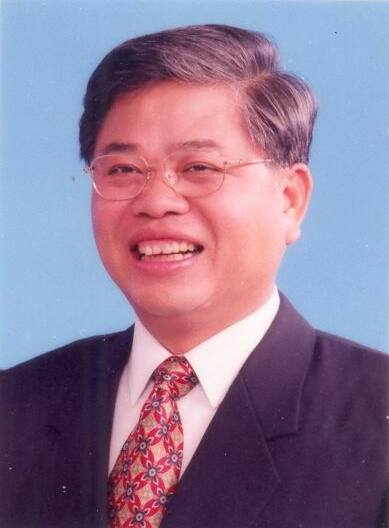

Member of the New Taipei City Council
- In office 25 December 2014 – 25 December 2018
- Constituency: New Taipei 7th precinct

Member of the Legislative Yuan
- In office 1 February 2002 – 31 January 2008
- Succeeded by: Wu Yu-sheng
- Constituency: Taipei County 1

Mayor of Shulin
- In office 1994–2002
- Preceded by: Liu Kuan-ming (劉寬明)
- Succeeded by: He Yu-zhi (何玉枝)

Personal details
- Born: 26 September 1956 (age 69)
- Party: Democratic Progressive Party (before 2001; since 2007)
- Other political affiliations: Taiwan Solidarity Union (2001–2007)
- Education: Fu Jen Catholic University (BA)

Liao Pen-yen (Chinese: 廖本煙; born 26 September 1956) is a Taiwanese politician who served two terms in the Legislative Yuan from 2002 to 2008.

== Education ==
Liao graduated from Fu Jen Catholic University with a degree in business management.

== Political career ==
Liao was elected the mayor of Shulin in 1993, serving in that position until 2002. During his tenure, Liao and other township heads were investigated for corruption, as they had charged multiple businesses a "township chief tax" to raise money for local community development funds. He ran in the legislative elections of 2001 and won a seat in the Legislative Yuan. Liao was the Taiwan Solidarity Union's caucus whip throughout most of his time in office. His expulsion from the TSU, announced in October 2007 and confirmed in November, for refusing to support the party's policies, led four other party members to defect. Shortly after Liao's expulsion the TSU ran ads in the United Daily News suggesting that Liao should join the Democratic Progressive Party. Later that month, Liao and a couple other defectors launched reelection bids under the DPP banner. A group of women's rights organizations opposed Liao's candidacy, and his 2008 campaign was unsuccessful. Though he was reported to be leading the race six days before polls opened, Liao lost to Huang Chih-hsiung by 5.49% of votes. Liao stood for election again in 2012, but did not win. He was elected to the New Taipei City Council in 2014.

== Controversy ==
In 2010, the Taipei District Court found Liao not guilty of taking bribes from the Taiwan Dental Association. In September 2011, the Taiwan High Court heard an appeal of the case and sentenced him to seven years and three months imprisonment, as well as a suspension of civil rights for three years. The High Court ruling was appealed to the Supreme Court, which cleared him of the charges in March 2016.

== Personal life ==
Liao Pen-yen's son Liao Yi-kun ran for a legislative seat in 2016, but was defeated in a Democratic Progressive Party primary by Su Chiao-hui.
