= Lu Chia-chen =

Taiwanese politician

Lu Chia-chen MLY
- 盧嘉辰
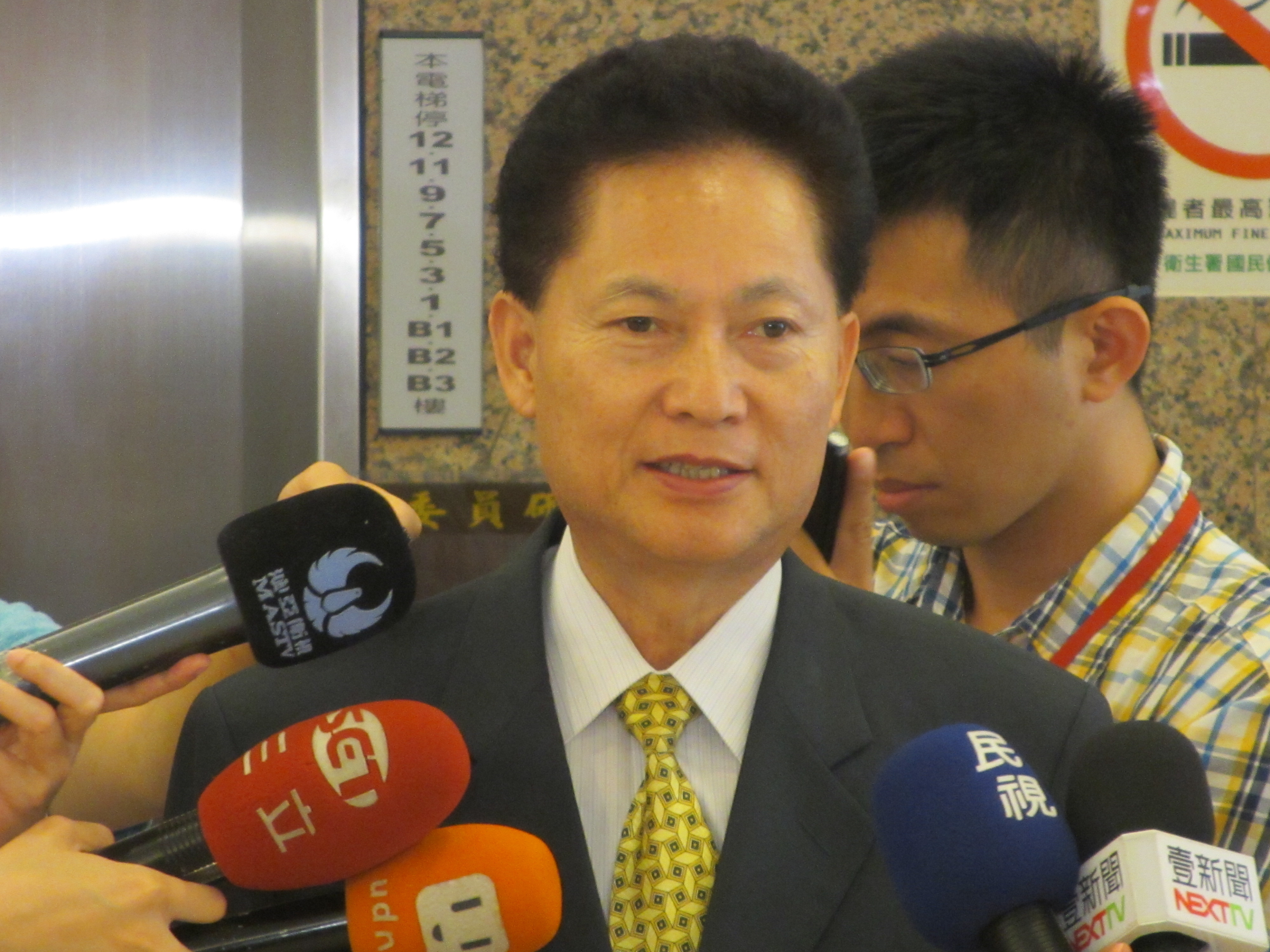
- Lu in July 2015

Member of the Legislative Yuan
- In office 3 March 2008 – 31 January 2016
- Succeeded by: Wu Chi-ming
- Constituency: New Taipei 10

Mayor of Tucheng
- In office 1 March 2002 – 2 March 2008

Member of the Taipei County Council
- In office 1 March 1994 – 28 February 2002

Member of the Taipei County Township and District Assembly
- In office 1 March 1987 – 28 February 1994
- Constituency: Tucheng

Personal details
- Born: 1 January 1953 (age 73) Taipei County, Taiwan
- Party: Kuomintang
- Education: Chung Hua University (BA, MA)

Lu Chia-chen (Chinese: 盧嘉辰; pinyin: Lú Jiāchén; born 1 January 1953) is a Taiwanese politician.

== Education ==
Lu earned bachelor's and master's degrees from Chung Hua University.

== Political career ==
Lu is a longtime ally of Wang Jin-pyng. Lu served on the township council as a representative of Tucheng District for two terms. He then was elected to the Taipei County Council, again for two terms. Lu returned to Tucheng as district leader, and ran for a seat on the Legislative Yuan near the end of his second term. He was elected to the Legislative Yuan in January 2008, defeating Lee Wen-chung, but did not take office at the start of the February legislative session. Because Lu held his Tucheng District post until March, the need for a local by-election was eliminated. Lu was sworn in as a member of the Legislative Yuan on 3 March, after jogging from Tucheng to the Legislative Yuan in Taipei. He faced Chuang Suo-hang in the 2012 elections and won. In April, he proposed that benefits for employees of state-run enterprise be reduced because some of the companies lost too much money to justify the benefits offered. Lu lost his seat to Wu Chi-ming in 2016.

== Controversy ==
Throughout his legislative tenure, Lu has been known to make controversial comments. In October 2008 he said of lawmaker Chiu Yi-ying, "The only way to make Chiu happy is to find her a husband." In March 2009, he opined that the health of Kaohsiung mayor Chen Chu had turned due to bad karma, as she had ordered city officials to remove a Chiang Kai-shek statue.

In April 2013, Lu's district office in Tucheng was the site of an attempted bombing. A suitcase containing an explosive was discovered in his office hours after a similar item was found in the Taiwan High Speed Rail Train 616. The two suspects were tracked to China and repatriated days after the discovery of the bombs. The bomb maker asserted that the bombs would not have exploded, but both suspects were indicted in June. The New Taipei District Court ruled on the case in January 2014. Upon appeal to the Supreme Court, both defendants' sentences were shortened.
