= New Taipei City Constituency 10 =

Constituency of the Legislative Yuan of Taiwan

- Single-member constituency for the Legislative Yuan
- District(s): Tucheng, Sanxia
- Electorate: 290,715 (2024 election)

Current constituency
- Created: 2008 (as Taipei County Constituency 10); 2010 (current name)
- Party: DPP
- Member: Wu Chi-ming

New Taipei City Constituency 10 (Chinese: 新北市第十選舉區; pinyin: Xīnběi Shì Dìshí Xuǎnjǔ Qū) is one of the 73 regional constituencies represented in the Legislative Yuan, the national legislature of Taiwan. It was created in 2008 (as Taipei County Constituency 10) following a series of constitutional reforms, and elects one legislator, through first-past-the-post voting, to the Legislative Yuan. It has been represented by Wu Chi-ming of the Kuomintang since 2016.

== Legislators ==
Election	Legislator	Party
2008 - 2016	Lu Chia-chen	Kuomintang
2016	Wu Chi-ming	Democratic Progressive Party

== Election results ==

=== 2008 (Note: Named Taipei County Constituency 10, boundaries unchanged.) ===
2008 Taiwanese legislative election: Taipei County 10
Candidate	Party	Votes	%
Lu Chia-chen	Kuomintang	77,656	60.11
Lee Wen-chung	Democratic Progressive Party	50,869	39.37
Li Hui-hsien	Red Party	669	0.52
Total		129,194	100.00
Valid votes		129,194	98.16
Invalid/blank votes		2,428	1.84
Total votes		131,622	100.00
Registered voters/turnout		236,269	55.71
Majority		26,787	20.74
Kuomintang win (new seat)			

=== 2012 ===
* denotes the incumbent legislator

2012 Taiwanese legislative election: New Taipei 10
Candidate	Party	Votes	%	+/–
Lu Chia-chen*	Kuomintang	89,570	47.67	▼12.44
Chuang Suo-hang	Democratic Progressive Party	81,520	43.39	▲4.02
Yang Mu-wan	Green Party Taiwan	8,598	4.58	NEW
Wang Chin-fen	Independent	6,873	3.66	NEW
Yu Chun-wen	Taiwanism Party	1,324	0.70	NEW
Total		187,885	100.00	–
Valid votes		187,885	98.22	
Invalid/blank votes		3,407	1.78	
Total votes		191,292	100.00	
Registered voters/turnout		257,744	74.22	
Majority		8,050	4.28	
Kuomintang hold				

=== 2016 ===
* denotes the incumbent legislator

2016 Taiwanese legislative election: New Taipei 10
Candidate	Party	Votes	%	+/–
Wu Chi-ming	Democratic Progressive Party	102,854	58.50	▲15.11
Lu Chia-chen*	Kuomintang	67,619	38.46	▼9.21
Huang Lu-kuang	Free Taiwan Party	5,337	3.04	NEW
Total		175,810	100.00	–
Valid votes		175,810	97.31	
Invalid/blank votes		4,866	2.69	
Total votes		180,676	100.00	
Registered voters/turnout		272,370	66.33	
Majority		35,235	20.04	
Democratic Progressive Party gain from Kuomintang				

=== 2020 ===
* denotes the incumbent legislator

2020 Taiwanese legislative election: New Taipei 10
Candidate	Party	Votes	%	+/–
Wu Chi-ming*	Democratic Progressive Party	92,665	44.77	▼13.73
Lin Chin-chieh	Kuomintang	73,686	35.60	▼2.86
Li Chin-ying	Independent	38,977	18.83	NEW
Tseng I-ching	United Action Alliance	1,166	0.56	NEW
Liu Jui-na	Independent	476	0.23	NEW
Total		206,970	100.00	–
Valid votes		206,970	98.61	
Invalid/blank votes		2,911	1.39	
Total votes		209,881	100.00	
Registered voters/turnout		282,441	74.31	
Majority		18,979	9.17	
Democratic Progressive Party hold				

=== 2024 ===
* denotes the incumbent legislator

2024 Taiwanese legislative election: New Taipei 10
Candidate	Party	Votes	%	+/–
Wu Chi-ming*	Democratic Progressive Party	103,437	50.58	▲5.81
Lin Chin-chieh	Kuomintang	95,147	46.52	▲10.92
Meng Ai-lun	The People Union Party	3,319	1.62	NEW
Yuan Hsing	Rehabilitation Alliance Party	2,608	1.28	NEW
Total		204,511	100.00	–
Valid votes		204,511	97.25	
Invalid/blank votes		5,779	2.75	
Total votes		210,290	100.00	
Registered voters/turnout		290,715	72.34	
Majority		8,290	4.06	
Democratic Progressive Party hold				
