= New Taipei City Constituency 5 =

Constituency of the Legislative Yuan of Taiwan

- Single-member constituency for the Legislative Yuan
- District(s): Shulin, Yingge, Sanchong (9 villages)
- Electorate: 257,063 (2024 election)

Current constituency
- Created: 2008 (as Taipei County Constituency 5); 2010 (current name)
- Party: DPP
- Member: Su Chiao-hui

New Taipei City Constituency 5 (Chinese: 新北市第五選舉區; pinyin: Xīnběi Shì Dìwǔ Xuǎnjǔ Qū) is one of the 73 regional constituencies represented in the Legislative Yuan, the national legislature of Taiwan. It was created in 2008 (as Taipei County Constituency 5) following a series of constitutional reforms, and elects one legislator, through first-past-the-post voting, to the Legislative Yuan. It has been represented by Su Chiao-hui of the Democratic Progressive Party since 2016.

== Legislators ==
Election	Legislator	Party
2008 - 2016	Huang Chih-hsiung	Kuomintang
2016	Su Chiao-hui	Democratic Progressive Party

== Election results ==

=== 2008 (Note: Named Taipei County Constituency 5, boundaries unchanged.) ===
2008 Taiwanese legislative election: Taipei County 5
Candidate	Party	Votes	%
Lee Hung-chun	Kuomintang	61,948	52.32
Liao Pen-yen	Democratic Progressive Party	55,444	46.83
Wen Ping-yuan	Green Party Taiwan	507	0.43
Wang Wen-hsiu	Red Party	338	0.29
Chen Cheng-chun	Independent	154	0.13
Total		118,391	100.00
Valid votes		118,391	98.72
Invalid/blank votes		1,530	1.28
Total votes		119,921	100.00
Registered voters/turnout		206,823	57.98
Majority		6,504	5.49
Kuomintang win (new seat)			

=== 2012 ===
* denotes the incumbent legislator

2012 Taiwanese legislative election: New Taipei 5
Candidate	Party	Votes	%	±
Huang Chih-hsiung*	Kuomintang	90,856	52.78	▲0.46
Liao Pen-yen	Democratic Progressive Party	78,651	45.69	▼1.14
Chiang Ting-chien	National Health Service Alliance	2,101	1.22	NEW
Huang Mao	Taiwan Basic Law Alliance	543	0.32	NEW
Total		172,151	100.00	–
Valid votes		172,151	98.17	
Invalid/blank votes		3,214	1.83	
Total votes		175,365	100.00	
Registered voters/turnout		231,558	75.73	
Majority		12,205	7.09	
Kuomintang hold				

=== 2016 ===
* denotes the incumbent legislator

2016 Taiwanese legislative election: New Taipei 5
Candidate	Party	Votes	%	±
Su Chiao-hui	Democratic Progressive Party	92,237	56.11	▲10.42
Huang Chih-hsiung*	Kuomintang	67,014	40.77	▼12.01
Kuo Pai-yu	New Power Party	5,130	3.12	NEW
Total		164,381	100.00	–
Valid votes		164,381	98.83	
Invalid/blank votes		1,940	1.17	
Total votes		166,321	100.00	
Registered voters/turnout		244,030	68.16	
Majority		25,223	15.34	
Democratic Progressive Party gain from Kuomintang				

=== 2020 ===
* denotes the incumbent legislator

2020 Taiwanese legislative election: New Taipei 5
Candidate	Party	Votes	%	±
Su Chiao-hui*	Democratic Progressive Party	106,368	57.10	▲0.99
Huang Chih-hsiung	Kuomintang	77,919	41.83	▲1.06
Hsu Chin-chu	Chinese Illumination Party	1,999	1.07	NEW
Total		186,286	100.00	–
Valid votes		186,286	98.53	
Invalid/blank votes		2,787	1.47	
Total votes		189,073	100.00	
Registered voters/turnout		251,452	75.19	
Majority		28,449	15.27	
Democratic Progressive Party hold				

=== 2024 ===
* denotes the incumbent legislator

2024 Taiwanese legislative election: New Taipei 5
Candidate	Party	Votes	%	±
Su Chiao-hui*	Democratic Progressive Party	98,586	54.17	▼2.93
Hung Chia-chun	Kuomintang	83,424	45.83	▲4.00
Total		182,010	100.00	–
Valid votes		182,010	97.60	
Invalid/blank votes		4,474	2.40	
Total votes		186,484	100.00	
Registered voters/turnout		257,063	72.54	
Majority		15,162	8.34	
Democratic Progressive Party hold				
