= China Airlines Novotel COVID-19 cluster incident =

2021 disease outbreak in Taiwan

China Airlines crew COVID-19 cluster
- Disease: COVID-19
- Pathogen: Alpha (B.1.1.7)
- Source: China Airlines
- Location: Taiwan
- Index case: April 20, 2021
- Confirmed cases: 44

China Airlines crew COVID-19 cluster, also known as the China Airlines pilot cluster or the China Airlines Novotel cluster, was a cluster of COVID-19 infections associated with China Airlines in Taoyuan City, Republic of China (Taiwan). It was the second cluster involving infected airline pilots in Taiwan since the outbreak of the COVID-19 pandemic.

On 26 February 2021, the Central Epidemic Command Center (CECC) announced that crew members of Taiwanese airlines, classified as frontline personnel with high exposure risk, were eligible for publicly funded COVID-19 vaccination under the third priority category among the first three groups. Critics argued that pilots should have been prioritized for vaccination. In response, Minister of Health and Welfare Chen Shih-chung stated that the vaccination priority list had long been announced and questioned why objections had not been raised earlier. On 24 April, the CECC criticized China Airlines for the slow pace of vaccination, noting that only 44 of its 1,720 pilots had been vaccinated, compared to 235 pilots at EVA Air, more than five times as many. Starlux Airlines had also not encountered problems in arranging vaccination appointments.

As of 12 May 2021, according to case charts released by the CECC, the pilot cluster consisted of 44 confirmed cases, including 13 pilots, seven antibody-positive pilots, ten family members of pilots, two family members of antibody-positive pilots, five quarantine hotel employees, three family members of quarantine hotel employees, one quarantine hotel contractor, two flight attendants, and one shuttle bus driver employed by a quarantine hotel.

The Novotel hotel complex consisted of Building 1 (the main building) and Building 2, with Building 2 having been registered with the Taoyuan City Government as a quarantine hotel. However, due to insufficient room capacity in Building 2 beginning in February 2021, the hotel adopted a system of managing designated rooms in separate sections without applying to the city government for approval as a "multi-floor quarantine hotel". Some quarantined flight crew members were transferred from Building 2 to the seventh- and eighth-floor staff dormitories of Building 1, while ordinary guests were also accommodated on the eighth floor.

Hotel staff did not maintain clear separation between quarantined and non-quarantined individuals. The kitchen and a temporary waste disposal area were located on the same floor, and kitchen staff and housekeeping personnel shared elevators while simultaneously serving both quarantined guests and ordinary customers. Employees delivered meals wearing disposable raincoats purchased from convenience stores that provided inadequate protection. Because of late check-out and early check-in arrangements, housekeeping staff were sometimes left with only one hour to prepare rooms, and some rooms were reassigned to new guests without being disinfected. In addition, personnel self-management measures were found to be inadequate.

On 13 May 2021, genomic sequencing revealed that the subsequent Luzhou, Wanhua, and Yilan clusters involved the same SARS-CoV-2 B.1.1.7 lineage as the China Airlines Novotel cluster. The CECC concluded that the clusters might be related, although no epidemiological links had yet been identified. Since both the Wanhua cluster and the China Airlines cluster involved identical viral sequences, experts inferred that they represented the same transmission chain detected in different locations and were likely part of a single large community outbreak in Taiwan rather than multiple parallel chains of transmission. However, authorities emphasized that identical genomic sequences or the presence of the Alpha variant did not necessarily establish a direct connection to the China Airlines cluster, and that further investigation was required to determine the source. At the time, the related outbreaks included eight cases linked to the Yilan amusement arcade cluster and twenty cases associated with the Luzhou Lions Club cluster, which subsequently gave rise to seven Wanhua tea-house-related cases.

On 14 May 2021, the cluster involving pilots, hotel employees, and other associated individuals concluded with a total of 37 infections, while 412 individuals had completed quarantine and been released.

== Timeline ==
On 20 April, a male Indonesian cargo pilot in his 40s employed by China Airlines traveled to and from Australia on cargo duty. After developing symptoms of an itchy throat, he tested positive for COVID-19 in Australia.

On the same day, two imported cases (Cases 1078 and 1079), both China Airlines cargo crew members, were announced in Taiwan. The two had traveled together to and from the United States on duty on 14 April and stayed in quarantine at a hotel overseas until returning to Taiwan on 16 April. Case 1078 developed symptoms on 18 April, while Case 1079 developed symptoms on 17 April. Investigations into the sources of infection were ongoing. A total of 131 contacts were initially identified, of whom two were placed under home isolation and 129 under self-health management.

On 23 April, the Central Epidemic Command Center (CECC) received an official report from China Airlines and immediately initiated contact tracing and testing operations related to the Australian-confirmed pilot and his activities in Taiwan. Two contacts subsequently tested positive: Case 1090, a teenage male household member of the Indonesian pilot confirmed in Australia, and Case 1091, a male colleague in his 50s. Both were confirmed on 23 April. A total of 58 contacts were initially identified, including the two positive cases, eight who tested negative, 23 awaiting results, and 25 awaiting testing. Contact tracing remained ongoing. Expanded testing of cargo crew members under quarantine or self-health management was also initiated.

On 24 April, epidemiological investigations into the Australian-confirmed case continued. One retrospective testing case, Case 1092, a male cargo crew member in his 40s, tested positive. He had flown to New Zealand and the Netherlands between 9 and 16 April and remained asymptomatic during the trips. Tests conducted on 9 and 13 April were negative. After returning to Taiwan on 16 April, he completed three days of quarantine and tested negative upon release on 19 April. On 22 April, he flew to Japan and returned the same day, beginning another three-day quarantine period. During the afternoon, he underwent retrospective testing as a contact of the Australian-confirmed pilot and tested positive (Ct value 35; second sample Ct value 23; serum antibody negative). He was confirmed on 24 April. In response to the pilot infections, comprehensive nucleic acid and serological testing for all China Airlines flight crew members was launched on the same day.

On 25 April, another retrospective testing case, Case 1100, a male cargo crew member in his 50s, tested positive. In addition, Case 1101, a male cargo pilot in his 30s who had completed quarantine, was confirmed. Case 1100 had traveled to the United States between 13 and 17 April and returned to Taiwan on 18 April, undergoing three days of quarantine. He tested negative at his own expense on 21 April but later tested positive during retrospective testing related to the Australian-confirmed pilot. Case 1101 had traveled to Germany with three other crew members on 18 April and quarantined at a hotel in Germany before returning to Taiwan on 22 April. His test upon completing quarantine on 24 April returned positive (Ct value 28; repeat test Ct value 34; serum antibody negative), and he was confirmed on 25 April. Investigations into the source of infection remained ongoing. A total of 1,272 individuals were expected to be tested.

On 26 April, two additional retrospective testing cases were confirmed. Case 1102, a male cargo pilot in his 30s, had traveled to the United States between 6 and 9 April and returned to Taiwan without symptoms during his three-day quarantine, testing negative on 14 April. He flew to the United States again between 19 and 22 April and remained asymptomatic during quarantine upon his return. Beginning on 24 April, he developed symptoms including cough and fever (37.8 °C). A test conducted on 25 April before the completion of quarantine returned positive (Ct value 18), and he was confirmed on 26 April. Case 1105, a male cargo pilot in his 40s, had traveled to the United States between 8 and 10 April and tested negative on 15 April after returning to Taiwan. He reported experiencing loss of appetite beginning on 19 April. He tested positive (Ct value 32) on 25 April through the flight crew testing program and was confirmed on 26 April. Investigations into the source of infection continued. Three household contacts were placed under home isolation, while workplace contacts were being traced.

On 27 April, one additional confirmed case, Case 1111, was announced. She was an Indonesian woman in her 40s who had been placed under home isolation on 21 April as a contact of the pilot confirmed in Australia on 20 April and Case 1090, the teenage household member confirmed on 23 April. Tests conducted on 21 and 22 April were negative. On 26 April, she developed symptoms including dry throat, body aches, dizziness, a bitter taste in the mouth, nausea, and insomnia. She tested positive (Ct value 22) and was confirmed on 26 April. One household contact had their home isolation period extended until 10 May.

On 28 April, one imported and two locally transmitted cases were announced. The two local cases were Case 1113, a teenage male household member of a pilot who had tested positive for antibodies on 27 April, and Case 1114, a woman in her 40s from the same household. Neither had recent travel histories or symptoms. Case 1113 tested positive during contact tracing on 26 April (Ct value 36; repeat test on 27 April with Ct value 41; IgM negative and IgG positive antibodies) and was confirmed on 28 April. Apart from the pilot, the other two household members tested negative by PCR but were both IgM negative and IgG positive. Case 1114 tested positive during contact tracing on 26 April (Ct value 34; repeat test negative on 27 April; IgM negative and IgG positive antibodies). Aside from the pilot, the remaining two household members tested negative by PCR; one was IgM negative and IgG positive, while the other tested negative for antibodies.

On 29 April, two locally transmitted COVID-19 cases and one case under investigation were reported. Among the locally transmitted cases, one was Case 1120, a male Novotel Airport quarantine hotel employee in his 40s, and the other was Case 1121, a female household contact of Case 1078, which had been confirmed on 20 April. The case under investigation was Case 1122, a China Airlines cargo pilot. Case 1120, a man in his 40s with no recent travel history, was responsible for inspecting room cleanliness and occasionally assisting crew members by purchasing goods or delivering supplies, and wore masks and gloves during work. Beginning on 17 April, he developed symptoms including cough, runny nose, loss of appetite, and wheezing. He sought medical attention several times between 19 and 26 April without improvement. On 27 April, he was diagnosed with pneumonia, admitted to centralized isolation, and tested positive (Ct value 21; both IgM and IgG antibodies positive). He was confirmed on 29 April. As he lived alone, he had no household contacts. According to his activity history, 107 contacts, including friends, workplace contacts, and medical contacts, were initially identified, with four placed under home isolation and 103 under self-health management. Investigations into his activity and contact histories continued. Case 1121, a woman in her 40s and household contact of Case 1078, had been placed under home isolation on 20 April and initially tested negative. She developed chest tightness and shortness of breath on 27 April and tested positive (Ct value 18), being confirmed on 29 April. She had remained under home isolation during the two days before symptom onset and had no contacts requiring quarantine. By 29 April, apart from Case 1121, the remaining 28 household and workplace contacts of Case 1078 all tested negative. Case 1122, a male cargo pilot in his 50s, had operated flights to the United States from 2 to 9 April and tested negative upon completion of quarantine on 15 April. He again flew to the United States on 19 April and returned to Taiwan via Japan on 25 April. He remained asymptomatic during his three-day quarantine but developed sore throat and fever on 27 April. He tested positive (Ct value 21) and was confirmed on 29 April. One household contact was placed under home isolation, while workplace contacts continued to be traced.

On 30 April, three locally transmitted cases, Cases 1127, 1128, and 1129, all employees of the Novotel Airport quarantine hotel, were reported. Case 1127, a woman in her 20s working in the hotel's food and beverage department, had no recent travel history. On the morning of 29 April, she entered centralized quarantine under the “hotel clearance project” and developed an itchy throat that afternoon. She tested positive (Ct value 26) and was confirmed on 30 April. Ten contacts were initially identified and placed under home isolation. Case 1128, a man in his 20s working in housekeeping, was scheduled to undergo testing under the same project on 29 April, but developed a fever and was transferred for isolation and treatment, testing positive (Ct value 16) and being confirmed on 30 April. Four contacts were identified and placed under home isolation. Case 1129, a woman in her 60s also working in housekeeping, developed mild cough and sore throat on 26 April and self-medicated without seeking medical attention. She tested positive (Ct value 20) on 29 April and was confirmed on 30 April. Four contacts were initially identified and placed under home isolation. On 1 May, because she had traveled to Chiayi, ten additional contacts were identified, six of whom tested negative while the remaining were still undergoing testing.

On 1 May, one locally transmitted case, Case 1133, was reported. Case 1133, a boy under the age of five and a household contact of Case 1102, a cargo pilot confirmed on 26 April, had no recent travel history. He was placed under home isolation on 25 April and developed fever on 29 April. He tested positive (Ct value 18) and was confirmed on 1 May. The isolation period for two household contacts was extended until 15 May.

On 2 May, four locally transmitted cases were reported. Cases 1134, 1135, and 1136 were household contacts of Case 1129, while Case 1137 was a household contact of Case 1102 and Case 1133. Case 1134, a man in his 30s with no recent travel history, developed muscle aches and cough on 29 April. He tested positive (Ct value 29) and was confirmed on 2 May. Twenty-seven contacts were identified, including sixteen placed under home isolation and eleven under self-health monitoring. Case 1135, a man in his 60s, developed cough, fever, and diarrhea on 29 April and tested positive (Ct value 18), being confirmed on 2 May. His contacts had already been identified through Case 1129. Case 1136, a woman in her 30s, developed sore throat and fever between 28 and 29 April, sought medical attention, and tested positive (Ct value 19), being confirmed on 2 May. A total of 111 contacts were identified and placed under home isolation. Case 1137, a girl under the age of five with no symptoms and no recent travel history, was tested on 30 April after Case 1133 was confirmed and tested positive (Ct value 26), being confirmed on 2 May. Contacts associated with her had already been traced through Cases 1102 and 1133. On the same day, a male Russian pilot in his 30s, whose duties mainly involved flights to Australia, tested positive for antibodies. He had returned to Taiwan on 27 April and remained asymptomatic during his three-day quarantine. Under the hotel clearance project, he entered centralized quarantine and tested negative by PCR but positive for IgG antibodies on 30 April. As he had no household contacts in Taiwan, no contacts were traced.

On 3 May, two locally transmitted cases, Cases 1145 and 1146, were reported. Case 1145, a man in his 40s employed by an outsourced contractor at the airport quarantine hotel, had worked there continuously except on days off between early April and 28 April. He developed a cough on 28 April and sought medical attention on 30 April. Following assessment, he was tested on 1 May (Ct value 13) and was confirmed on 3 May. Twenty-three contacts were initially identified, with twenty placed under home isolation and three under self-health monitoring. Investigations into his activity history during the infectious period continued. A total of seventy-four outsourced workers, interns, and former employees associated with the hotel between 19 and 28 April were also placed under home isolation. Case 1146, an Indonesian girl in her teens and a household contact of the pilot who had tested positive in Australia as well as Cases 1090 and 1111, had no recent travel history. She was placed under home isolation on 21 April and initially tested negative. She developed mild fever, runny nose, and throat discomfort on 30 April but did not report the symptoms because they were mild. Given that other members of her family had already been confirmed, she was retested on 2 May (Ct value 19) and was confirmed on 3 May.

On 4 May, two cases with unknown sources of infection, Cases 1153 and 1154, were reported. Case 1153, a male China Airlines pilot in his 30s, had flown to the United States from 16 to 18 April and tested negative upon completion of quarantine. He again tested negative under the pilot screening program on 25 April. On 29 April, while under self-health management, he violated regulations by visiting a bar in Taipei's Songshan District together with Case 1154. He developed fever, cough, and runny nose on 1 May, reported his symptoms to the company, tested positive (Ct value 13), and was confirmed on 4 May. Fifteen contacts were identified, thirteen of whom were placed under home isolation and two under self-health monitoring. Case 1154, a female China Airlines flight attendant in her 20s, had flown to the United States from 22 to 25 April and tested negative before completing quarantine. In the early hours of 29 April, while under self-health management, she violated regulations by visiting the same bar with Case 1153. Later that day, she entered centralized quarantine under the airport quarantine hotel clearance project and tested negative by PCR and serology on 30 April. She developed fever, dizziness, and stomach pain on 2 May and tested positive (Ct value 14), being confirmed on 4 May. She had remained in centralized quarantine during the two days before symptom onset and therefore had no contacts requiring tracing. Whether her infection was related to Case 1153 remained under investigation.

On 5 May, genomic sequencing showed that Cases 1078, 1079, 1090, 1091, 1092, 1120, 1127, 1128, 1129, 1135, 1136, and 1145 all belonged to the same B.1.1.7 lineage first identified in the United Kingdom. Cases 1101 and 1102, which had previously been considered to belong to a different British variant lineage from the flight crew cluster, were re-evaluated after the children of Case 1102, Cases 1133 and 1137, were successively confirmed. Sequencing showed that Cases 1133 and 1137 shared the same sequence as Case 1102, leading the CECC to conclude that the household cluster associated with Case 1102 constituted a separate transmission event. At the same time, because Case 1102 resided in Chenggong Public Housing but the location had not appeared in the movement records released by the central government, residents became alarmed. Taipei Mayor Ko Wen-je subsequently stated that he hoped the central government would provide a complete list of locations.

On 6 May, one locally transmitted case, Case 1174, was reported. Case 1174, a male employee in his 30s working in the engineering department of the airport quarantine hotel, had no recent history of overseas travel. Due to work requirements, he frequently interacted with the housekeeping department and had close contact with Cases 1120 and 1129. On 29 April, he entered centralized isolation under the “airport quarantine hotel clearance project” and tested negative by both PCR and serological tests. He developed sore throat, fever, and muscle aches on 3 May and reported his symptoms on 4 May. He subsequently tested positive (Ct value 17) and was confirmed on 6 May. As of that day, five employees of the Novotel Airport quarantine hotel had tested positive, namely Cases 1120, 1127 to 1129, and 1174. In addition, among the 80 contacts who had worked at the hotel between 19 and 28 April, including outsourced workers, interns, and former employees, PCR and serological testing had been largely completed. PCR testing showed 73 negative results, one positive result (Case 1145), and six samples still under examination. Serological testing showed 61 negative results and 19 samples still under examination.

On 8 May, one case with an infection source under investigation, Case 1183, was reported. Case 1183, a male China Airlines pilot in his 50s, had operated flights to Vietnam and Thailand on 19 and 22 April respectively, and served as a simulator instructor for Case 1153 on 28 April. He tested negative by both PCR and serology under the “pilot project” on 24 April and received his first dose of the Oxford–AstraZeneca vaccine on 29 April. He developed fatigue on 4 May and fever on 6 May, sought medical attention the same day, and was confirmed on 8 May (Ct value 16). The source of infection remained under investigation. Two contacts were initially identified and placed under home isolation. One locally transmitted case, Case 1184, a female household contact of Case 1183 in her 50s, was also reported. After Case 1183 tested positive, she was tested on 7 May (Ct value 23) and confirmed on 8 May. Investigations into her contacts were ongoing.

On 10 May, three locally transmitted cases were reported. Case 1186, a male driver in his 40s responsible for transporting airport quarantine hotel employees, had no recent history of overseas travel. Between 23 and 28 April, he had transported Cases 1128 and 1129. On 29 April, he entered centralized quarantine under the “hotel clearance project” and tested negative by both PCR and serology. He developed fever, cough, and diarrhea on 7 May and was tested on 8 May (Ct value 20), being confirmed on 10 May. As a precaution, retrospective testing was arranged for his household contacts. Case 1187, a male China Airlines pilot in his 40s, had flown to the United States between 20 and 22 April. He tested negative by both PCR and serology under the “pilot project” on 25 April. On 2 May, he rode in the same shuttle vehicle to the company with Case 1183. He developed fever on 6 May but only self-medicated and did not seek medical attention. On 8 May, he was identified as a home isolation contact of Case 1183 and, due to his fever, underwent testing (Ct value 16), being confirmed on 10 May. The source of infection remained under investigation. Twenty-six contacts were initially identified, including twenty-four placed under home isolation and two under self-health monitoring, and all were scheduled for testing. Since Case 1187 had visited public venues during his infectious period (archived page), the public was advised to conduct 14 days of self-health monitoring if they had visited the same locations and to seek medical attention while wearing a mask should symptoms develop. Cases 1199 and 1200, a woman in her 40s and a girl in her teens respectively, were household contacts of Case 1105. Together with another family member, they had been placed under home isolation on 26 April and tested negative by both PCR and serology. They remained asymptomatic during the isolation period, but on 9 May, testing before the end of quarantine yielded positive results (Ct value 28 for Case 1199 and Ct value 33 for Case 1200), and they were confirmed on 10 May. One household contact had previously been listed as a contact of Case 1105 and tested negative on 9 May. His home isolation period was extended until 23 May.

On 11 May, one plus six locally transmitted cases were reported. One of these, Case 1201, was a female household contact of Case 1187 in her 40s. She had no recent history of overseas travel and remained asymptomatic. After Case 1187 was confirmed, she was placed under home isolation on 9 May and subsequently tested positive (Ct value 22), being confirmed on 11 May. Three contacts were identified, but all had already been listed as contacts of Case 1187 and therefore were not counted again.

On 12 May, one case under investigation, Case 1222, was reported. Case 1222, a female China Airlines flight attendant in her 30s, had operated a flight to Vietnam together with Case 1187 on 5 May. She developed a sore throat on 9 May but did not seek medical attention. On 10 May, she was identified as a contact of Case 1187 and placed under home isolation. She was tested the same day (Ct value 22) and was confirmed on 12 May. The source of infection remained under investigation. Three contacts were initially identified and placed under home isolation. Investigations into her activity and contact histories were ongoing.

== Response Measures ==
=== Contact Tracing, Testing, Epidemiological Investigation, and Quarantine Measures ===
On 23 April, the Central Epidemic Command Center (CECC) stated that expanded testing would continue for China Airlines cargo flight crews who were either under home quarantine or self-health management.

On 24 April, the CECC launched a comprehensive screening program for China Airlines flight crew members, including polymerase chain reaction (PCR) tests and serological antibody tests (IgM and IgG). By that date, 261 crew members had undergone PCR testing, with one positive result (Case 1101) and 260 negative results. Serological testing had been completed for 200 individuals, with 199 negative results and one sample still under examination. The CECC stated that all related testing would be completed as quickly as possible.

On 25 April, the source of infection remained under investigation, and a total of 1,272 individuals were scheduled for testing.

On 26 April, the CECC launched the “China Airlines Pilot Testing Program,” under which all pilots were required to undergo screening. On the same day, two additional cases were confirmed: Case 1102, a male cargo pilot in his 30s who had operated flights to the United States between 6 and 9 April, and Case 1105, a male cargo pilot in his 40s who had flown to the United States between 8 and 10 April.

On 27 April, testing had been carried out for 934 of the 1,279 pilots. Among them, 925 had negative antibody results, six tested positive, and three samples remained under examination. The six seropositive pilots included Case 151, a male in his 30s confirmed in March 2020; Case 177, a male in his 40s confirmed in March 2020; Case 1105, who had been confirmed on 26 April; two men in their 40s (Serology-positive Cases 1 and 2); and one woman in her 40s (Serology-positive Case 3). The latter three individuals had undergone project testing on 22, 24, and 25 April respectively, with negative PCR results but positive IgG and negative IgM antibody results. The CECC announced that investigations into their flight records and crew contacts would continue, and close contacts would undergo PCR and serological testing.

On 28 April, the CECC stated that, based on available information, the risk of community transmission remained low. Nevertheless, activity histories of confirmed cases and antibody-positive individuals would be investigated, and close contacts would receive free PCR and antibody tests. By that date, 1,014 pilots had undergone antibody testing, with 1,007 negative results, six positive results, and one sample still pending. The six positive individuals included Case 1105, Case 1101, Case 1102, and Cases 1091, 1092, and 1110.

On 29 April, following the confirmation of a quarantine hotel employee, the CECC ordered all staff members of the Novotel Airport quarantine hotel to undergo testing. All individuals staying at the hotel were transferred to centralized quarantine facilities, and thirty-nine environmental samples from the hotel were collected for analysis. On the same day, Taoyuan Mayor Cheng Wen-tsan announced that approximately 422 China Airlines crew members staying at the hotel would be transferred to centralized quarantine facilities or quarantine hotels. The original hotel would then be emptied, disinfected, and left vacant for fourteen days.

On 30 April, after Case 1120, a male housekeeping supervisor at the airport quarantine hotel, was confirmed, the “hotel clearance project” and mass testing of all employees were initiated. By that date, 206 people had been tested, with three positive results (Cases 1127, 1128, and 1129) and 203 negative results. Since infected hotel employees had visited public places before isolation, the public was advised to conduct fourteen days of self-health monitoring and to seek medical attention while wearing masks if symptoms developed.

On 2 May, among the 1,279 China Airlines pilots, antibody testing had been completed for 1,225 individuals. Of these, 1,212 were negative, twelve were positive, and one sample remained under examination. One additional antibody-positive case was identified on the same day, involving a Russian pilot in his 30s who regularly operated flights to and from Australia.

On 4 May, antibody testing had been completed for 1,234 pilots. A total of 1,216 had tested negative, twelve positive, and six samples were still being processed. The twelve seropositive individuals included Cases 129, 151, 177, 330, 1105, 1122, and Serology-positive Cases 1 through 6.

On 5 May, PCR testing had been completed for 1,241 pilots, with 1,234 negative results and seven positive results. The seven positive cases were Cases 1091, 1092, 1100, 1101, 1102, 1105, and 1122. Serological testing had also been completed for 1,241 individuals, yielding 1,223 negative results, twelve positive results, and six samples still under examination. The list of twelve seropositive individuals remained unchanged from 4 May.

On 7 May, PCR testing had been completed for 1,250 pilots, with 1,243 negative results and seven positive results, identical to those reported on 5 May. Antibody testing had also been completed for 1,250 individuals, producing 1,236 negative results, twelve positive results, and two pending samples. The list of twelve positive cases remained unchanged.

On 8 May, PCR testing had been completed for 1,258 pilots, with 1,251 negative results and seven positive results, unchanged from 5 May. Antibody testing had been conducted on 1,258 individuals, producing 1,238 negative results, twelve positive results, and eight samples still pending. The list of twelve seropositive individuals remained unchanged.

On 11 May, PCR testing had been completed for 1,261 pilots, with 1,257 negative results and seven positive results, identical to those reported on 5 May. Serological testing had also been completed for 1,261 pilots, yielding 1,246 negative results, twelve positive results, and three samples still pending. The list of twelve seropositive individuals remained unchanged from 4 May. A total of 1,261 pilots had been tested. The remaining eighteen individuals had not yet undergone testing because they were on extended leave, leave without pay, or grounded, and most were abroad. They would be tested upon returning to Taiwan. The CECC announced that the case would be considered closed, with any additional positive cases to be announced separately if detected.

Related Response Measures and Comprehensive Inspection of Quarantine Hotels

On 30 April, in response to the COVID-19 infection of an airport quarantine hotel employee, the Central Epidemic Command Center (CECC) considered the facility to pose a potential transmission-chain risk. Consequently, investigations were launched into flight crew members who had checked out of the hotel between 15 and 28 April, and home quarantine measures were expanded accordingly. Members of the public who had visited the hotel during that period were instructed to conduct 14 days of self-health monitoring from the date of exposure. Individuals who developed fever, upper respiratory symptoms, diarrhea, or loss of smell or taste were advised to wear medical masks, seek medical attention at designated community testing facilities, and proactively inform medical personnel of their contact history, travel history, occupational exposure, and whether people around them had similar symptoms. They were also instructed not to use public transportation when seeking medical care.

The operation of quarantine hotels had already been regulated under the COVID-19 Guidelines for the Establishment and Management of Quarantine Hotels. Local governments were required to conduct at least one monthly inspection according to the COVID-19 Quarantine Hotel Inspection Checklist, covering five areas: accommodation arrangements, access control and safety management, room facilities, environmental cleaning and waste disposal, and personnel health management.[49] In response to this incident, the CECC announced a comprehensive nationwide inspection of quarantine hotels and instructed local governments to complete inspections of all quarantine facilities under their jurisdictions by 17 May 2021. Hotels found to require improvements would receive enhanced supervision and follow-up inspections to safeguard community epidemic prevention.

Strengthening and Implementing Epidemic Prevention Measures for Foreign and Domestic Airline Crews

On 3 May, the CECC convened meetings with the Civil Aeronautics Administration, the Tourism Administration and the Taoyuan City Government to discuss epidemic prevention measures for airline crews and improvements to quarantine hotels. To effectively separate individuals under home quarantine according to different categories, the CECC announced that foreign airline crew members would, in principle, be accommodated in a single designated quarantine hotel, with arrangements jointly coordinated by the Civil Aeronautics Administration and the Taoyuan City Government. Quarantine hotels used by domestic airline crew members would be planned by the Civil Aeronautics Administration and jointly inspected with the Taoyuan City Government.

=== Zero-Infection Project ===
On 6 May, the CECC announced the “China Airlines Crew Zero-Infection Project,” which immediately strengthened quarantine requirements and supporting measures for airline crews.

In addition to extending quarantine from three days to five days, followed by nine days of enhanced self-health management, long-haul captains of China Airlines would also be subject to increased testing frequency, with up to five tests required.

The quarantine measures would be subject to rolling reviews based on overseas station management by airlines, implementation of the Zero-Infection Project, compliance with self-health management requirements, and vaccination coverage.

1. Crew members entering countries or regions classified as Level 3 epidemic areas (long-haul flights):
  - Quarantine: Five days of home quarantine followed by nine days of enhanced self-health management.
  - Testing: Nasopharyngeal or throat swab tests on Days 5 and 14, and deep-throat saliva tests on Days 7, 9, and 12.
2. Crew members operating same-day return flights without entering Level 3 epidemic areas (short-haul flights):
  - Quarantine: Fourteen days of standard self-health management.
  - Testing: Deep-throat saliva test on Day 7 and nasopharyngeal or throat swab test on Day 14.

=== Zero-Infection Project 2.0 ===
On 10 May, detailed provisions of the “China Airlines Crew Zero-Infection Project 2.0” were announced:

1. All cockpit crew members were recalled for quarantine.
2. Cabin crew members who had operated long-haul flights or had potential exposure risks were required to undergo 14 days of quarantine.
3. Relevant personnel were required to complete 14 days of quarantine before re-entering the community and had to test negative before release.
4. Members of high-risk groups and low-risk groups were prohibited from operating mixed flight assignments.
