= New Taipei City Constituency 7 =

Constituency of the Legislative Yuan of Taiwan

- Single-member constituency for the Legislative Yuan
- District(s): Banqiao (61 villages)
- Electorate: 233,122 (2024 election)

Current constituency
- Created: 2008 (as Taipei County Constituency 7); 2010 (current name)
- Party: KMT
- Member: Yeh Yuan-chih

New Taipei City Constituency 7 (Chinese: 新北市第七選舉區; pinyin: Xīnběi Shì Dìqī Xuǎnjǔ Qū) is one of the 73 regional constituencies represented in the Legislative Yuan, the national legislature of Taiwan. It was created in 2008 (as Taipei County Constituency 7) following a series of constitutional reforms, and elects one legislator, through first-past-the-post voting, to the Legislative Yuan. It has been represented by Yeh Yuan-chih of the Kuomintang since 2024.

== Legislators ==
Election	Legislator	Party
2008 - 2012	Wu Chin-chih	Kuomintang
2012 - 2016	Chiang Huei-chen	Kuomintang
2016 - 2024	Lo Chih-cheng	Democratic Progressive Party
2024	Yeh Yuan-chih	Kuomintang

== Election results ==

=== 2008 (Note: Named Taipei County Constituency 7, boundaries unchanged.) ===
2008 Taiwanese legislative election: Taipei County 7
Candidate	Party	Votes	%
Wu Chin-chih	Kuomintang	65,752	55.83
Chuang Suo-hang	Democratic Progressive Party	49,008	41.61
Lin Yu-jen	Taiwan Solidarity Union	1,583	1.34
Lin Shu-hui	Third Society Party	1,436	1.22
Total		117,779	100.00
Valid votes		117,779	98.66
Invalid/blank votes		1,594	1.34
Total votes		119,373	100.00
Registered voters/turnout		205,175	58.18
Majority		16,744	14.22
Kuomintang win (new seat)			

=== 2012 ===
2012 Taiwanese legislative election: New Taipei 7
Candidate	Party	Votes	%	+/–
Chang Huei-chen	Kuomintang	73,686	44.31	▼11.52
Lo Chih-cheng	Democratic Progressive Party	71,207	42.82	▲1.21
Tseng Wen-chen	Independent	21,411	12.87	NEW
Total		166,304	100.00	–
Valid votes		166,304	98.22	
Invalid/blank votes		3,007	1.78	
Total votes		169,311	100.00	
Registered voters/turnout		218,275	77.57	
Majority		2,479	1.49	
Kuomintang hold				

=== 2016 ===
* denotes the incumbent legislator

2016 Taiwanese legislative election: New Taipei 7
Candidate	Party	Votes	%	+/–
Lo Chih-cheng	Democratic Progressive Party	82,544	53.61	▲10.79
Chang Huei-chen*	Kuomintang	61,345	39.84	▼4.47
Li Wan-yu	Independent	8,038	5.22	NEW
Wang Cheng-hua	National Health Service Alliance	2,039	1.32	NEW
Total		153,966	100.00	–
Valid votes		153,966	98.42	
Invalid/blank votes		2,471	1.58	
Total votes		156,437	100.00	
Registered voters/turnout		224,631	69.64	
Majority		21,199	13.77	
Democratic Progressive Party gain from Kuomintang				

=== 2020 ===
* denotes the incumbent legislator

2020 Taiwanese legislative election: New Taipei 7
Candidate	Party	Votes	%	+/–
Lo Chih-cheng*	Democratic Progressive Party	82,764	46.95	▼6.66
Ko Chih-en	Kuomintang	70,659	40.08	▲0.24
Wu Ta-wei	Taiwan People's Party	20,579	11.67	NEW
Huang Tsu-chen	Independent	927	0.53	NEW
Chu Sheng-hsing	Stabilizing Force Party	907	0.51	NEW
Lien Shih-lei	Taiwan Labour Party (Note: Not affiliated with Labor Party (Taiwan))	235	0.13	NEW
Chang Yuan-i	Interfaith Union	224	0.13	NEW
Total		176,295	100.00	–
Valid votes		176,295	98.63	
Invalid/blank votes		2,455	1.37	
Total votes		178,750	100.00	
Registered voters/turnout		233,095	76.69	
Majority		12,105	6.87	
Democratic Progressive Party hold				

=== 2024 ===
* denotes the incumbent legislator

2024 Taiwanese legislative election: New Taipei 7
Candidate	Party	Votes	%	+/–
Yeh Yuan-chih	Kuomintang	78,134	46.11	▲6.03
Lo Chih-cheng*	Democratic Progressive Party	75,841	44.76	▼2.19
Liu Shu-ting	Taiwan Obasang Political Equality Party	15,479	9.13	NEW
Total		169,454	100.00	–
Valid votes		169,454	97.80	
Invalid/blank votes		3,808	2.20	
Total votes		173,262	100.00	
Registered voters/turnout		233,122	74.32	
Majority		2,293	1.35	
Kuomintang gain Democratic Progressive Party				
