= New Taipei City Constituency 6 =

Constituency of the Legislative Yuan of Taiwan

- Single-member constituency for the Legislative Yuan
- District(s): Banqiao (65 villages)
- Electorate: 222,016 (2024 election)

Current constituency
- Created: 2008 (as Taipei County Constituency 6); 2010 (current name)
- Party: DPP
- Member: Chang Hung-lu

New Taipei City Constituency 6 (Chinese: 新北市第六選舉區; pinyin: Xīnběi Shì Dìliù Xuǎnjǔ Qū) is one of the 73 regional constituencies represented in the Legislative Yuan, the national legislature of Taiwan. It was created in 2008 (as Taipei County Constituency 6) following a series of constitutional reforms, and elects one legislator, through first-past-the-post voting, to the Legislative Yuan. It has been represented by Chang Hung-lu of the Democratic Progressive Party since 2016.

== Legislators ==
Election	Legislator	Party
2008 - 2016	Lin Hung-chih	Kuomintang
2016	Chang Hung-lu	Democratic Progressive Party

== Election results ==

=== 2008 (Note: Named Taipei County Constituency 6, boundaries unchanged.) ===
2008 Taiwanese legislative election: Taipei County 6
Candidate	Party	Votes	%
Lin Hung-chih	Kuomintang	69,097	56.94
Wang Shu-hui	Democratic Progressive Party	51,775	42.66
Lin Ching-sung	World Peace Party	489	0.40
Total		121,361	100.00
Valid votes		121,361	98.80
Invalid/blank votes		1,468	1.20
Total votes		122,829	100.00
Registered voters/turnout		206,225	59.56
Majority		17,322	14.28
Kuomintang win (new seat)			

=== 2012 ===
* denotes the incumbent legislator

2012 Taiwanese legislative election: New Taipei 6
Candidate	Party	Votes	%	+/–
Lin Hung-chih*	Kuomintang	86,119	53.39	▼3.55
Chou Ya-shu	Democratic Progressive Party	73,950	45.85	▲3.19
Yang Cheng-chin	Taiwan National Assembly	1,229	0.76	NEW
Total		161,298	100.00	–
Valid votes		161,298	98.63	
Invalid/blank votes		2,244	1.37	
Total votes		163,542	100.00	
Registered voters/turnout		212,894	76.82	
Majority		12,169	7.54	
Kuomintang hold				

=== 2016 ===
2016 Taiwanese legislative election: New Taipei 6
Candidate	Party	Votes	%	+/–
Chang Hung-lu	Democratic Progressive Party	77,223	52.61	▲6.76
Lin Kuo-chun	Kuomintang	58,050	39.55	▼13.84
Kang Jen-chun	People First Party	4,085	2.78	NEW
Yu Hsin-i	Faith and Hope League	2,626	1.79	NEW
Li Chien-ming	Trees Party	1,816	1.24	NEW
Chuang Feng-ming	Independent	1,022	0.70	NEW
Yao Yu-shuang	Taiwan Labour Party (Note: Not affiliated with Labor Party (Taiwan))	774	0.53	NEW
Li Kuei-pao	Minkuotang	706	0.48	NEW
Huang Chun-min	Military, Civil and Faculty Alliance Party	473	0.32	NEW
Total		146,775	100.00	–
Valid votes		146,775	98.44	
Invalid/blank votes		2,321	1.56	
Total votes		149,096	100.00	
Registered voters/turnout		215,111	69.31	
Majority		19,173	13.06	
Democratic Progressive Party gain from Kuomintang				

=== 2020 ===
* denotes the incumbent legislator

2020 Taiwanese legislative election: New Taipei 6
Candidate	Party	Votes	%	+/–
Chang Hung-lu*	Democratic Progressive Party	88,236	54.35	▲1.74
Lin Kuo-chun	Kuomintang	69,178	42.61	▲3.06
Shih Jen-jen	People First Party	4,362	2.69	▼0.09
Chen Yu-feng	China Peaceful Reunification Party	570	0.35	NEW
Total		162,346	100.00	–
Valid votes		162,346	98.25	
Invalid/blank votes		2,885	1.75	
Total votes		165,231	100.00	
Registered voters/turnout		216,250	76.41	
Majority		19,058	11.74	
Democratic Progressive Party hold				

=== 2024 ===
* denotes the incumbent legislator

2024 Taiwanese legislative election: New Taipei 6
Candidate	Party	Votes	%	+/–
Chang Hung-lu*	Democratic Progressive Party	78,847	48.99	▼5.36
Lin Kuo-chun	Kuomintang	74,652	46.38	▲3.77
Huang Shu-chen	Judicial Revolution Party	7,450	4.63	NEW
Total		160,949	100.00	–
Valid votes		160,949	97.69	
Invalid/blank votes		3,808	2.31	
Total votes		164,757	100.00	
Registered voters/turnout		222,016	74.21	
Majority		4,195	2.61	
Democratic Progressive Party hold				
