= Yeh Yuan-chih =

Taiwanese politician (born 1974)

Yeh Yuan-chih MLY
- 葉元之
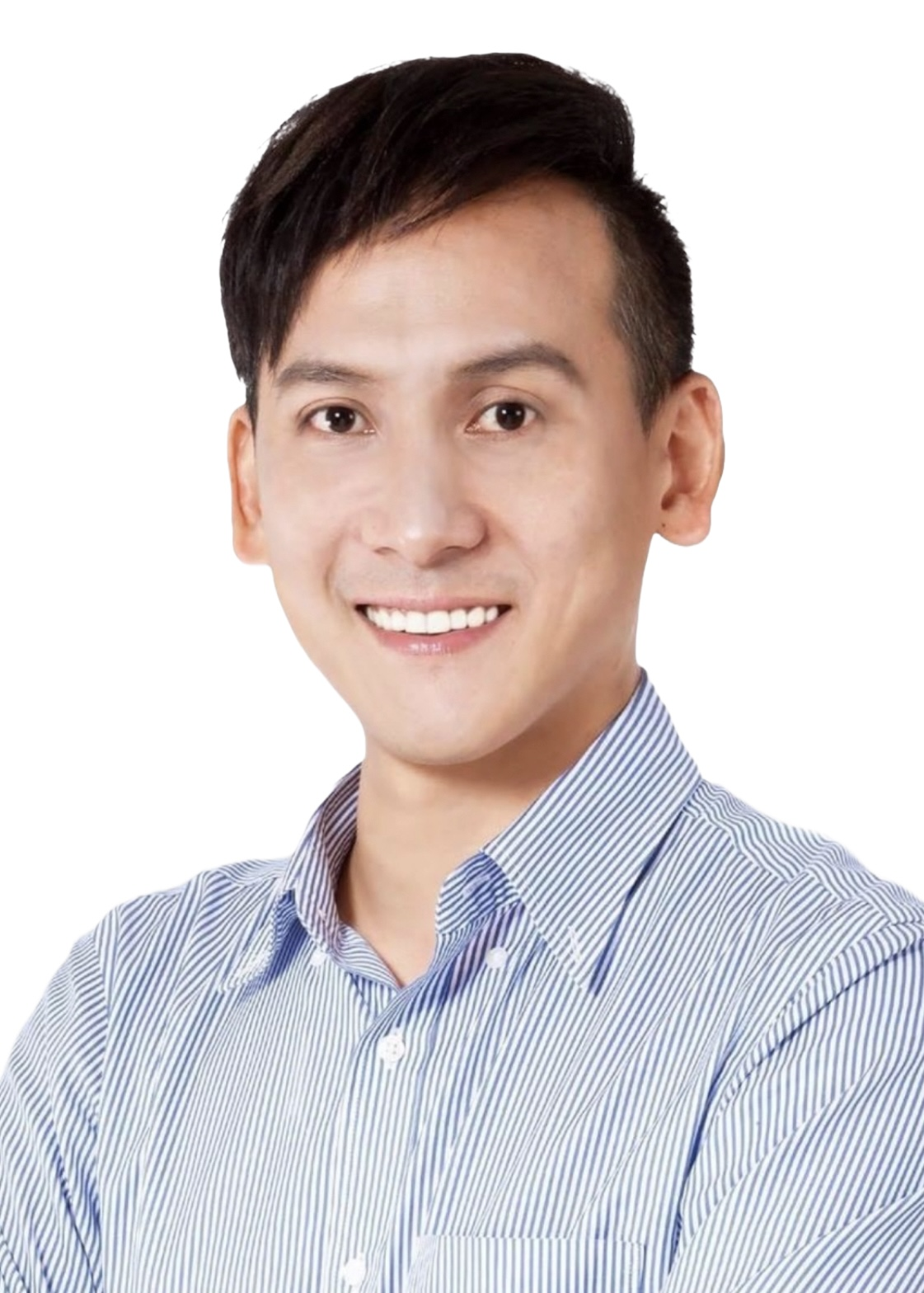
- Official portrait, 2018

Member of the Legislative Yuan
- Incumbent
- Assumed office 2 February 2024
- Preceded by: Lo Chih-cheng
- Constituency: New Taipei City Constituency 7

Member of New Taipei City Council
- In office December 25, 2018 – January 31, 2024
- Constituency: Banqiao District

Personal details
- Born: December 28, 1974 (age 51) Taipei City, Taiwan
- Party: Kuomintang
- Education: National Taiwan University (BA, BA, MA); University of Southern California (MA); National Taiwan Normal University (PhD)

Yeh Yuan-chih (Chinese: 葉元之; pinyin: Yè Yuánzhī; born December 28, 1974) is a Taiwanese politician and educator who has served as a member of the Legislative Yuan since 2024. He was previously a member of New Taipei City Council and has been a lecturer at the Taipei National University of the Arts.

Yeh was previously the spokesperson for Han Kuo-yu's campaign office and is a close associate of former Kuomintang chair Eric Chu.

== Early life and education ==
Yeh was born on December 28, 1974, in Taipei, Taiwan. His mother was a childhood friend of Hsu Li-nung, a retired army general and former chairman of the Veterans Affairs Council.

Yeh graduated from National Taiwan University with two bachelor's degrees in philosophy and political science, respectively. He then earned a master's degree from the university in national development in 2004. His master's thesis, A Study of News Releases by Taiwanese Presidential Election Candidates, examined the news-release practices of the joint presidential campaign of Lien Chan and James Soong.

Later, Yeh earned a Master of Arts (M.A.) in communications and management from the University of Southern California. In 2022, he earned his Ph.D. in education from National Taiwan Normal University. His doctoral dissertation was titled, A Study of Participating Active Aging Program for Elder Citizens and College Students (社區高齡者與大學生參與活躍老化方案之研究).

== Early career ==
Yeh has served as a part-time lecturer of journalism at Hsuan Chuang University, director of the integrated marketing and communication department of the China Digital Times, and a consultant at Oti Communications, a magazine business based in Birmingham, Alabama. He also has served as the press liaison for the 2004 Lien-Song National Campaign Headquarters, the press liaison for the 2000 Song-Song-Zhang Taipei Campaign Headquarters, a New York reporter for Ming Pao, and a public relations specialist for China Global Television Network (CGTN).

== Electoral history ==
Year	Elections	Electoral district	Party	Votes	Percentage
2018	The third New Taipei City Councilor Election	New Taipei City Fourth Electoral District	Kuomintang	31,043	10.96%
2022	The 4th New Taipei City Councilor Election	New Taipei City Fifth Electoral District	Kuomintang	28,418	11.08%
2024	Eleventh Legislative Council Election	New Taipei City Constituency 7	Kuomintang	78,134	46.11%
