= Wu Chi-ming =

Taiwanese politician

Wu Chi-ming MLY
- 吳琪銘
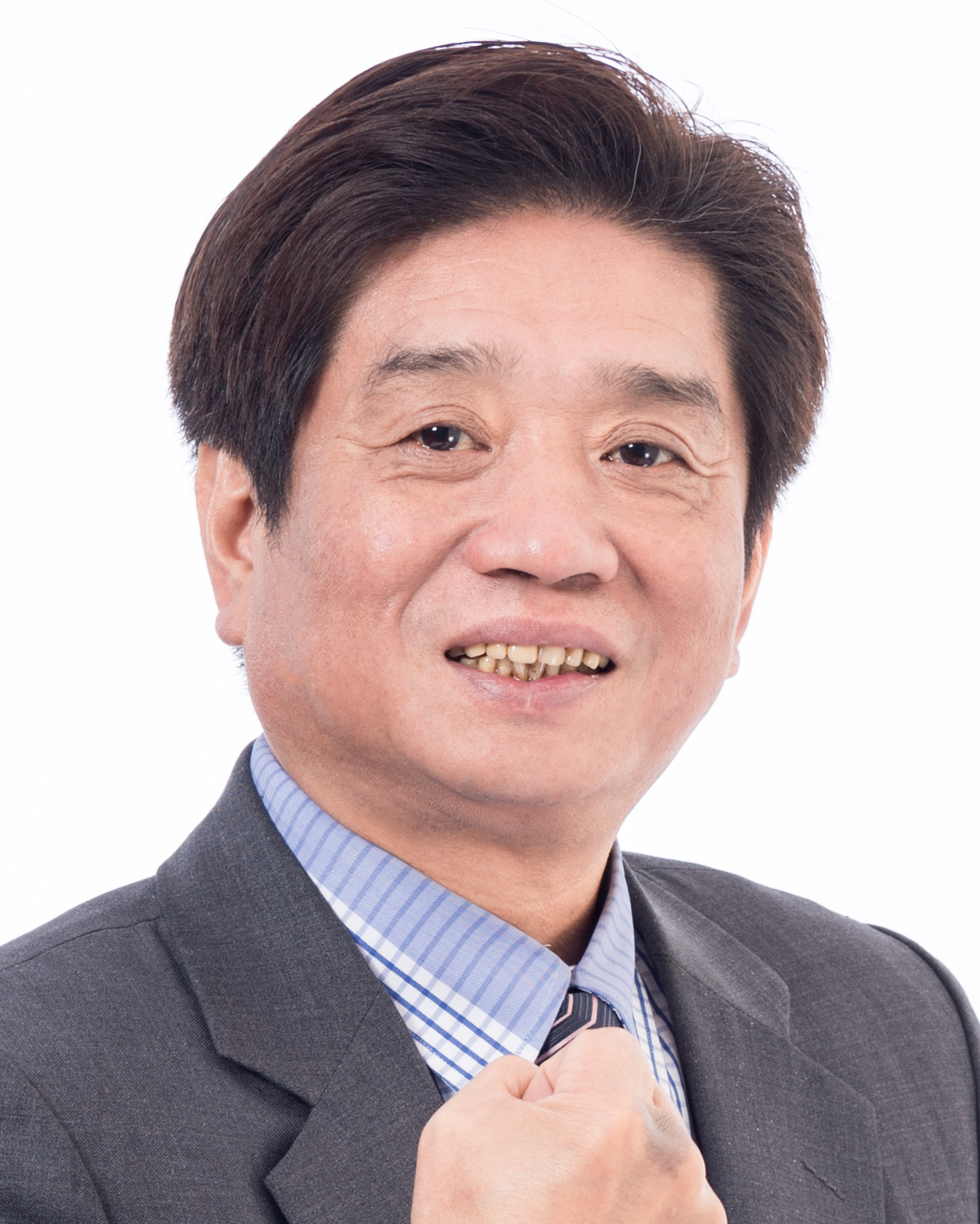
- Wu in May 2016

Member of the Legislative Yuan
- Incumbent
- Assumed office 1 February 2016
- Preceded by: Lu Chia-chen
- Constituency: New Taipei 10

Member of the New Taipei City Council
- In office 24 December 2010 – 31 January 2016
- Constituency: 7th precinct

Member of the Taipei County Council
- In office 1 March 2006 – 24 December 2010
- Constituency: 7th precinct

Personal details
- Born: 24 February 1963 (age 63) Yunlin County, Taiwan
- Party: Democratic Progressive Party
- Education: De Lin Institute of Technology (BS); Shih Hsin University (MBA)

Wu Chi-ming (Chinese: 吳琪銘; pinyin: Wú Qímíng; born 24 February 1963) is a Taiwanese politician.

Wu was first elected to the Taipei County Council in 2006. The county was upgraded to the special municipality New Taipei in 2010, and the council was renamed. Wu retained his seat in that year's local elections, and was reelected to the New Taipei City Council in 2014.

== Early life and education ==
Wu was born on 24 February 1963 in Yunlin County, Taiwan. He graduated from the De Lin Institute of Technology. Wu also enrolled in a master's-level credit program in administrative management at National Chengchi University. He later earned a Master of Business Administration (MBA) from Shih Hsin University. Before entering politics as a city representative, Wu ran a goose meat restaurant in Tucheng.

== 2016 legislative election ==
He resigned his council seat in 2016, when he was elected to the Legislative Yuan.

Legislative Election 2016: New Taipei 10th district
Party	Candidate	Votes	%	±%
DPP	Wu Chi-ming	102,854	58.50	
KMT	Lu Chia-chen	67,619	38.46	
Others	Huang Luguang	5,337	3.04	
Majority		35,235	20.04	
Total valid votes		175,810	97.31	
Rejected ballots		4,866	2.69	
DPP gain from KMT		Swing		
Turnout		180,676	66.33	
Registered electors		272,370		
