= Chung-Ming Wang =

Taiwanese politician (born 1978)

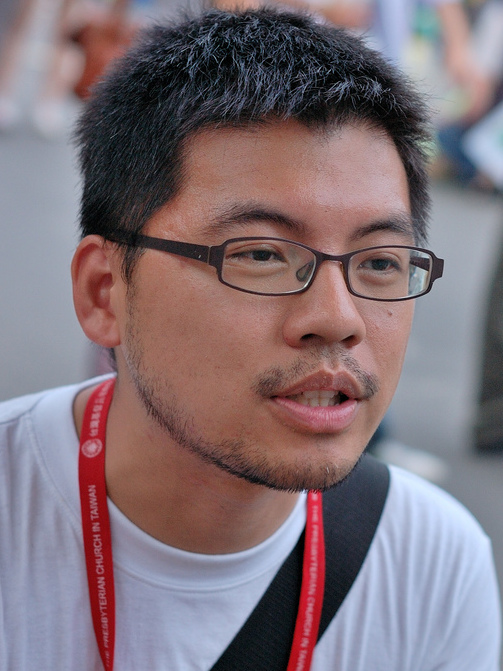
- Wang in 2010
- Born: Wang Chung-Ming; 8 December 1978 (age 47); Taipei, Taiwan
- Education: National Hsinchu University of Education; National Chung Cheng University (BA)
- Occupations: Politician, environmentalist and gay rights activist
- Political party: Green Party Taiwan

Chung-Ming Wang (Chinese: 王鐘銘; pinyin: Wáng Zhōngmíng; born 8 December 1978) is a Taiwanese Wikipedian, politician, environmentalist and gay rights activist.

== Politics ==
He is a member of the central executive committee of Green Party Taiwan. He was a candidate running for a councilor seat in New Taipei City (formerly Taipei County) in 2010 and was expected to run in the district legislative election in 2012. Before Wang became a politician and activist, he was an editor of books and magazines. Wang joined the Green Party in 2006 and is openly gay.

== Wikipedian ==
Chung-Ming Wang joined Wikipedia in March 2004. He was mentioned in the China Times in May 2004, which made him the first Taiwanese Wikipedian who was reported in the media.

Wang prepared the formation of Wikimedia Taiwan from February in 2006 and he was elected as a director in the first Congress of Wikimedia Taiwan.

== Activity ==
In Oct 2011, when Occupy Wall Street protests spread to cities in Asia, Wang and protesters gathered outside the Taipei 101 building because "A large building like Taipei 101 is a clear symbol of wealth."

On April 17, 2012, for protesting the Tamsui North Shore Road Project, Wang filed a lawsuit with the High Administrative Court of Taiwan. On September 4, 2013, the court declared the EIA report as invalid.

In April 2013, Wang and other anti-nuclear group members had a meeting about nuclear waste with Taiwan Premier Jiang Yi-huah. During the same period, Wang joined a tree-occupying action.

== Jail ==
Wang was charged with obstructing official duties and was found guilty and was put in jail twice. One is for a protest against the demolition of a military veterans community, and the other is for a protest against the removal of trees for a public construction project. Both is sentenced to three months.
