= Wu Chin-chih =

Taiwanese politician

Wu Chin-chih MLY
- 吳清池

Member of the Legislative Yuan
- In office 1 February 2008 – 31 January 2012
- Succeeded by: Chiang Huei-chen
- Constituency: Taipei County 7th
- In office 1 February 2005 – 31 January 2008
- Succeeded by: Wu Yu-sheng
- Constituency: Taipei County 1st
- In office 1 February 1999 – 31 January 2002
- Constituency: Taipei County 1st

Mayor of Banqiao
- In office 1 March 1990 – 1 March 1998
- Preceded by: Chang Fu-tang (張馥堂)
- Succeeded by: Lin Hung-chih

Member of the Taipei County Council
- In office 1986–1990

Personal details
- Born: 20 May 1949 (age 76) Banqiao, Taipei County, Taiwan
- Party: Kuomintang
- Other political affiliations: People First Party
- Education: National Chengchi University (BA)

Wu Chin-chih (Chinese: 吳清池; pinyin: Wú Qīngchí; born 20 May 1949) is a Taiwanese politician.

== Education ==
Wu attended National Chengchi University.

== Political career ==
Wu served on the Taipei County Council from 1986 to 1990, when he was elected mayor of Banqiao. Wu stepped down at the end of his second mayoral term to run for a legislative seat, which he relinquished in 2002. During his second stint in the Legislative Yuan, from 2005 to 2008, Wu was backed by the People First Party. By 2008, during his third term, Wu had rejoined the Kuomintang.
