= Chuang Suo-hang =

Taiwanese politician

Chuang Suo-hang MLY
- 莊碩漢
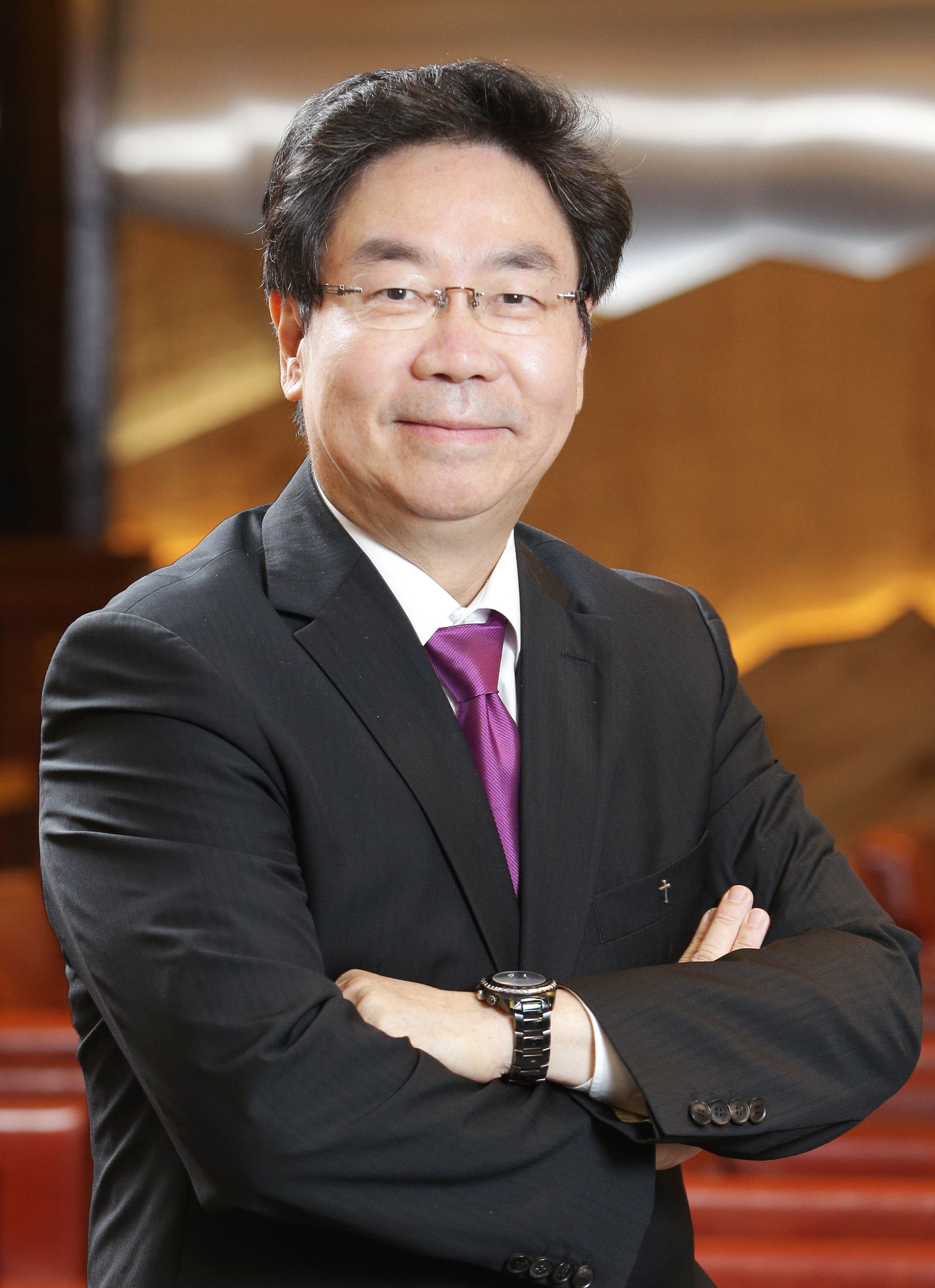
- Chuang in 2018

Member of the Legislative Yuan
- In office 1 February 2005 – 31 January 2008
- Constituency: Taipei County 1

Personal details
- Born: 24 October 1955 (age 70) Taipei County, Taiwan
- Party: Democratic Progressive Party (since 2002)
- Education: National Taiwan University (BA); Northern Illinois University (MA); University of Southern California (PhD)

Chuang Suo-hang (Chinese: 莊碩漢; born 24 October 1955) is a Taiwanese political scientist and politician. He was a member of the Legislative Yuan from 2005 to 2008.

== Education ==
Chuang graduated from National Taiwan University with a Bachelor of Arts (B.A.) in political science in 1977, then completed graduate studies in the United States. He earned a Master of Arts (M.A.) in political science from Northern Illinois University in 1979 and his Ph.D. in the political science from the University of Southern California in 1982. His doctoral dissertation, completed under Professor Stanley Rosen, was titled, "The Petty Private Economy in China: Capitalism Within a Socialist System."

== Political career ==
Chuang joined the Democratic Progressive Party in 2002. He served as spokesperson of the Executive Yuan until 2003, when he was named to the Overseas Chinese Affairs Commission. By 2004, Chuang had stepped down from OCAC to represent the DPP in that year's legislative elections. Upon taking office as legislator, he was named leader of the Exchange Association of Taiwanese and French Legislators within the Legislative Yuan.

After losing reelection in 2008 to Wu Chin-chih, Chuang became director of the Democratic Progressive Party's Policy Research Committee and acted as party spokesperson. He again represented the DPP in the 2012 legislative elections, and lost. Chuang launched his New Taipei mayoral campaign in 2013, and lost to Yu Shyi-kun in a primary. Shortly after the announcement of the New Southbound Policy, Chuang was named to a DPP-convened committee charged with promoting it. In 2017, Chuang was appointed a vice chair of the Taiwan External Trade Development Council and took on the role as chairman of the Taipei World Trade Center in January 2020.

Chuang was appointed Taiwan's representative to Thailand in June 2022, succeeding Lee Ying-yuan, who resigned the position in August 2021. In June 2023, Chuang resigned from the diplomatic post due to allegations of sexual harassment against him. A committee convened by the Ministry of Foreign Affairs determined that the allegations against Chuang were credible, and referred Chuang's case to the Control Yuan in October 2023. The Control Yuan formally impeached Chuang in July 2024, and further referred the case to the Disciplinary Court.
