= Lin Hung-chih =

Taiwanese politician

Lin Hung-chih MLY
- 林鴻池
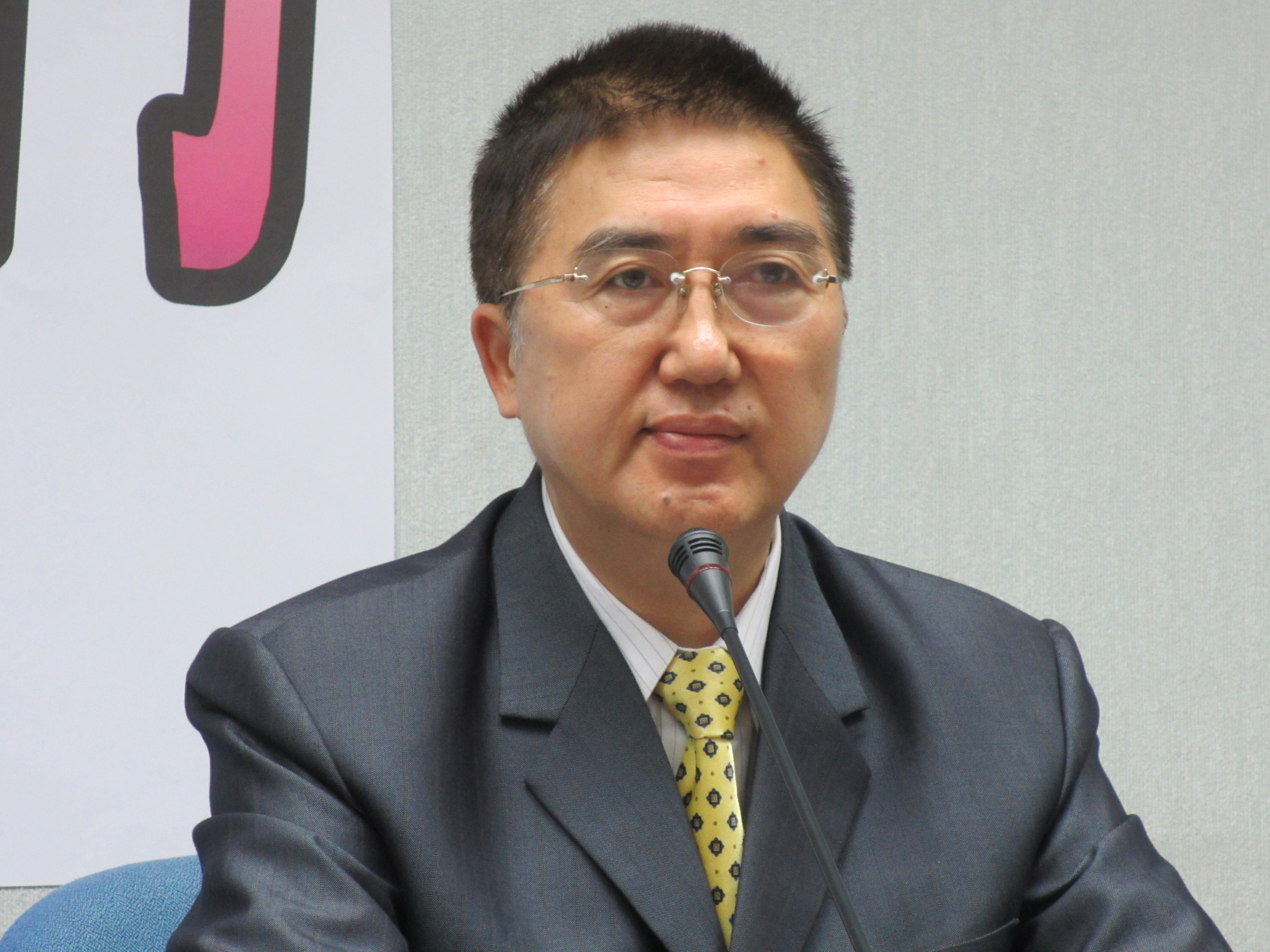
- Lin in 2013

Majority Leader of the Legislative Yuan
- In office 1 February 2012 – 31 July 2014
- Preceded by: Lin Yi-shih
- Succeeded by: Alex Fai

Member of the Legislative Yuan
- In office 1 February 2005 – 31 January 2016
- Preceded by: Wang Shu-hui
- Succeeded by: Chang Hung-lu
- Constituency: New Taipei 6

Mayor of Banqiao
- In office 1 March 1998 – 1 February 2005
- Preceded by: Wu Chin-chih
- Succeeded by: Chang Hung-lu

Member of the National Assembly
- In office 1992–2000

Personal details
- Born: 22 August 1955 (age 70) Pingxi, Taipei County, Taiwan
- Party: Kuomintang
- Education: National Cheng Kung University (BS); National Chengchi University (MA)

Lin Hung-chih (Chinese: 林鴻池; pinyin: Lín Hóngchí; born 22 August 1955) is a Taiwanese politician.

== Education ==
Lin earned a bachelor's degree in transportation and communications management from National Cheng Kung University, before obtaining his master's in political science at National Chengchi University.

== Political career ==
Lin launched a bid for a seat on the National Assembly in 1991 and served until 2000. While a member of the assembly, he was elected mayor of Banqiao and reelected in 2001. Lin stepped down in 2005 at the end of that second term to run for the Legislative Yuan. He was twice reelected to the Legislative Yuan, in 2008 and 2012, but refused to stand in the 2016 election, because his party, the Kuomintang, had suffered heavy losses in the November 2014 local elections.
