= Wang Shu-hui =

Taiwanese politician and political scientist

- 王淑慧
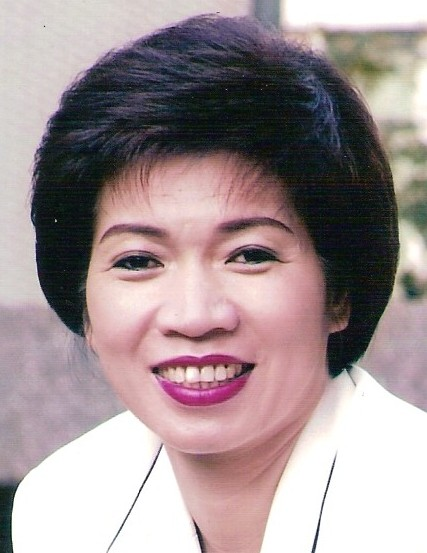
- Official portrait, 2000

New Taipei City Councillor
- In office 25 December 2010 – 25 December 2022
- Constituency: New Taipei IV

Member of the Legislative Yuan
- In office 1 February 2002 – 31 January 2008
- Succeeded by: Lin Hung-chih
- Constituency: Taipei County VI

Taipei County Councillor
- In office 1 March 1990 – 31 January 2002
- Constituency: Banqiao District

Personal details
- Born: December 2, 1955 (age 70) Taipei, Taiwan
- Party: Democratic Progressive Party
- Education: Fu Jen Catholic University (BA); National Taiwan University (MA); Illinois State University (PhD); Tamkang University (MA)
- Profession: Linguist; Political scientist

Wang Shu-hui (Chinese: 王淑慧; pinyin: Wáng Shúhùi; born 2 December 1955) is a Taiwanese political scientist, linguist, and former legislator for the Democratic Progressive Party in Taiwan.

Wang Shu-hui has on occasion participated in physical confrontations during her time as a Taiwanese legislator, including one incident involving a thrown shoe. In 2006, Wang shoved a transportation proposal on opening links with mainland China in her own mouth to prevent it being voted upon. She later spat the proposal out and tore it up.

She was defeated by Lin Hung-chih of the Kuomintang for Taipei County constituency 6 in the 2008 legislative election.

Wang subsequently won election to the New Taipei City Council in 2010, 2014, and 2018. In January 2022, during her third term as city councilor, the New Taipei City District Court sentenced Wang to nine years imprisonment for fraud that had taken place during her first term in office. Wang was found to have listed relatives as members of her staff, then collected the wages and subsides set aside for them.
