= Chang Hung-lu =

Taiwanese politician

Chang Hung-lu MLY
- 張宏陸
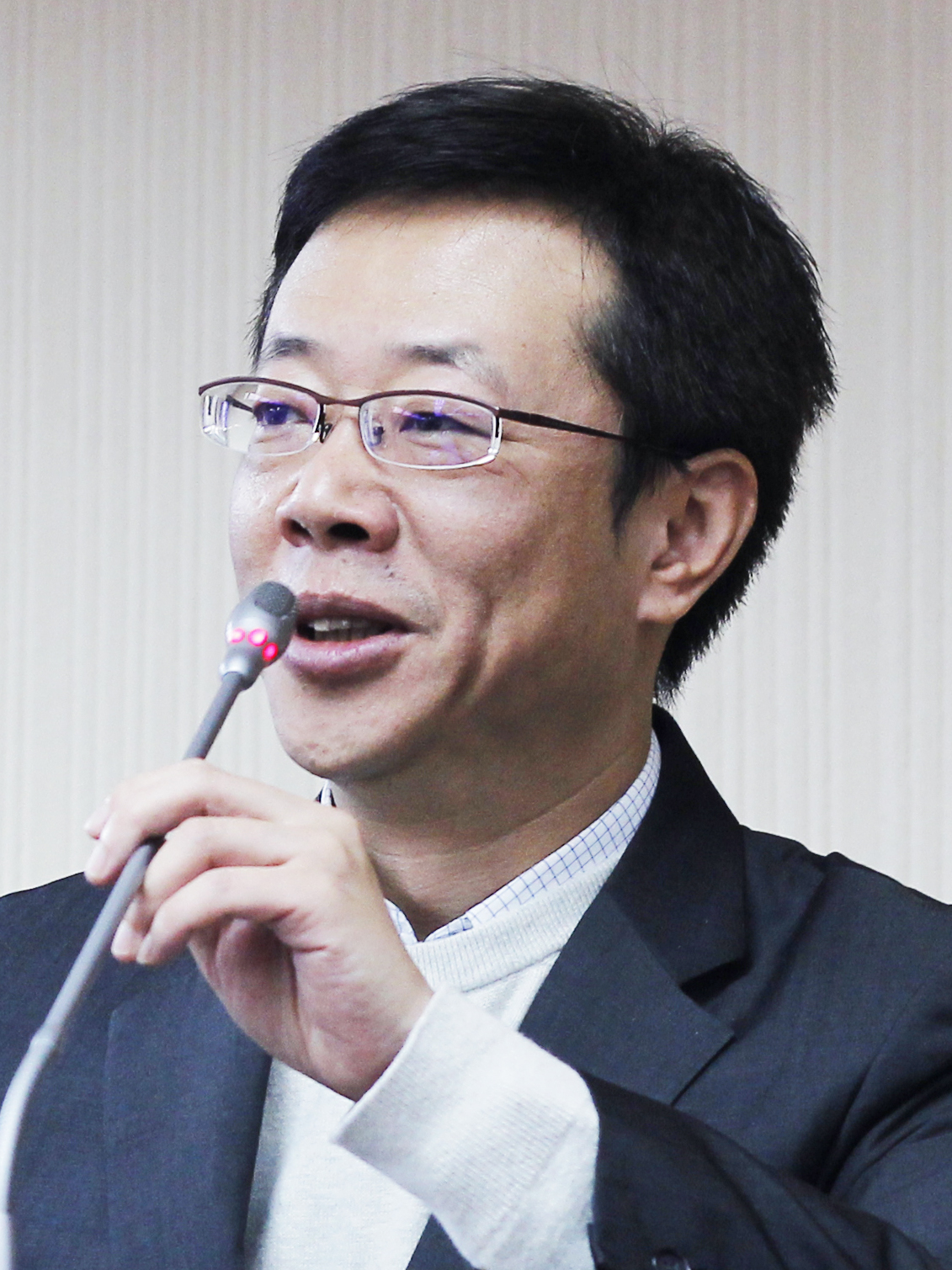

Member of the Legislative Yuan
- Incumbent
- Assumed office 1 February 2016
- Preceded by: Lin Hung-chih
- Constituency: New Taipei 6

Member of the New Taipei City Council
- In office 25 December 2010 – 31 January 2016
- Constituency: Banqiao (fourth) precinct

Mayor of Banqiao (acting)
- In office 1 February 2005 – 20 December 2005
- Preceded by: Lin Hung-chih
- Succeeded by: Liao Rong-ching (acting); Chiang Huei-chen

Personal details
- Born: 10 January 1972 (age 54) Shengang, Taichung County, Taiwan
- Party: Democratic Progressive Party
- Education: Soochow University (BA); National Taipei University of Education (MA)

Chang Hung-lu (Chinese: 張宏陸; pinyin: Zhāng Hónglù; born 10 January 1972) is a Taiwanese politician. A member of the Democratic Progressive Party (DPP), he currently serves as a member of the Legislative Yuan.

== Early life and education ==
Born in Taichung, Chang obtained his bachelor's degree in political science from Soochow University and master's degree in education from National Taipei University of Education.

== Political career ==
Chang is a close ally of Su Tseng-chang, having worked for him from 1996 to 2004. From 2002 to 2005, he led the Taipei County Bureau of Civil Affairs. Chang stepped down from the Democratic Progressive Party's Central Standing Committee in 2010. During his stint on the New Taipei City Council, ten members of the council were charged with "divulging secrets" in a council speakership election. All charges were cleared by the Taiwan High Court in January 2015.

Chang ran for the Banqiao District seat in the Legislative Yuan in 2016, and succeeded incumbent Lin Hung-chih, who did not run for reelection. He retained the seat in the 2020 election.

In September 2023, along with fellow legislators, Chang traveled to the United States to join a New York City march in support of Taiwan's bid to join the United Nations.
