= Huang Chih-hsiung =

Taiwanese taekwondo practitioner

- 黃志雄
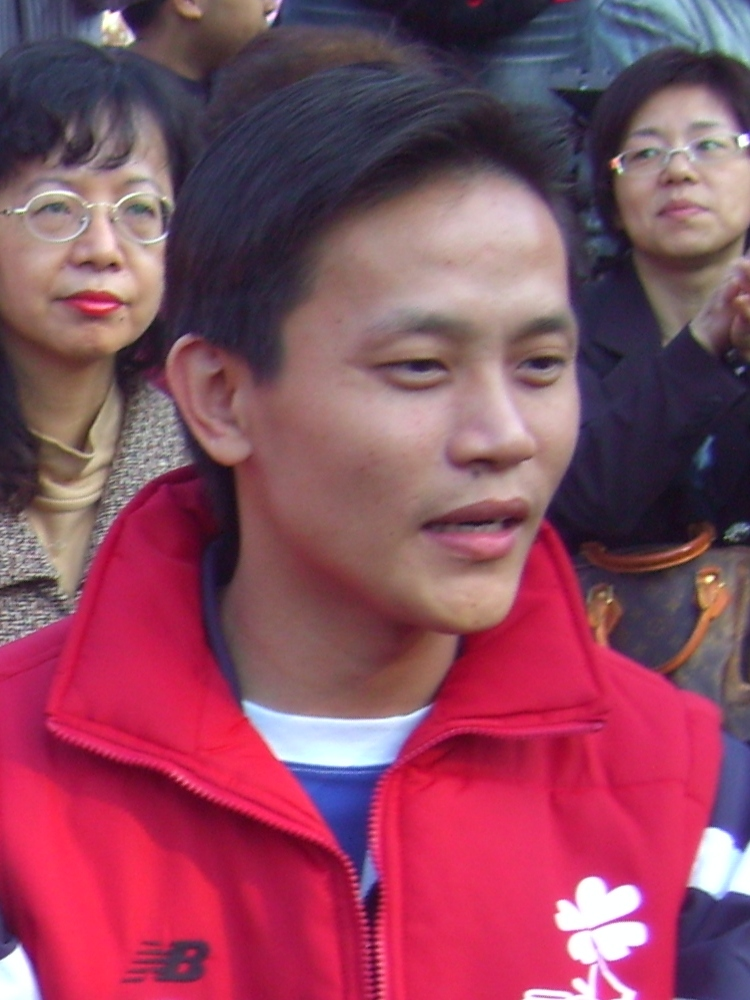

Member of the Legislative Yuan
- In office 1 February 2008 – 1 February 2016
- Preceded by: Constituency created
- Succeeded by: Su Chiao-hui
- Constituency: New Taipei 5

Personal details
- Born: October 16, 1976 (age 49) Taipei County, Taiwan
- Party: Kuomintang
- Education: Chinese Culture University (BA, MA)
- Sports career
- Sport: Taekwondo
Medal record
Men's taekwondo
Representing Chinese Taipei
Olympic Games
Silver medal – second place	2004 Athens	68 kg
Bronze medal – third place	2000 Sydney	58 kg
World Championships
Gold medal – first place	2003 Garmisch	Bantamweight
Gold medal – first place	1997 Hong Kong	Bantamweight
Bronze medal – third place	1995 Manila	Bantamweight
Asian Games
Gold medal – first place	2002 Busan	Bantamweight

Chinese name
- Traditional Chinese: 黃志雄
- Hanyu Pinyin: Huáng Zhìxióng
Transcriptions
Standard Mandarin
- Hanyu Pinyin: Huáng Zhìxióng

Huang Chih-hsiung (Chinese: 黃志雄; pinyin: Húang Zhìxióng; born October 16, 1976) is a Taiwanese athlete. Representing Taiwan (as Chinese Taipei) in the 2004 Summer Olympics, he won the silver medal at the Men's 68 kg Taekwondo event. At the 2000 Summer Olympics he won a bronze medal at the Men's 58 kg Taekwondo event.

== Early life and education ==
Huang was born on 16 October 1976 in Taipei County (now New Taipei City), Taiwan. He was educated at Taipei County Wenlin Elementary School and Taipei County Shulin Junior High School before graduating from National Overseas Chinese Experimental Senior High School.

Huang earned a Bachelor of Arts in martial arts from Chinese Culture University and a Master of Arts in sports coaching from the university.

== Political careers ==
=== 2004 legislative election ===
Huang was placed third on the Kuomintang's legislators-at-large candidate list for the December 2004 legislative election, just behind Legislative Speaker Wang Jing-pyng and Deputy Legislative Speaker Chiang Pin-kung, and he subsequently won a seat in the sixth Legislative Yuan.

=== 2008 legislative election ===
He was subsequently re-elected in the January 2008 legislative election, earning a place in the seventh Legislative Yuan.

No.	Candidate	Party	Votes	Ratio	Elected
1	Wun Bing Yuan (溫炳原)	Green Party Taiwan	507	0.43%	
2	Chen Cheng Jyun (陳誠鈞)	Independent	154	0.13%	
3	Wang Wun Siou (王文秀)	Home Party	338	0.29%	
4	Huang Chih-hsiung	Kuomintang	61,948	52.32%	Yes
5	Liao Pen-yen	Democratic Progressive Party	55,444	46.83%	

=== 2016 legislative election ===
Legislative Election 2016: New Taipei 5th district
Party	Candidate	Votes	%	±%
DPP	Su Chiao-hui	92,237	56.11	
KMT	Huang Chih-hsiung	67,014	40.77	
NPP	Kuo Po-yu	5,130	3.12	
Majority		25,223	15.34	
Total valid votes		164,381	98.83	
Rejected ballots		1,940	1.17	
DPP gain from KMT		Swing		
Turnout		166,321	68.16	
Registered electors		244,030		
