= Hung Mong-kai =

Taiwanese politician (born 1983)

Hung Mong-kai MLY
- 洪孟楷
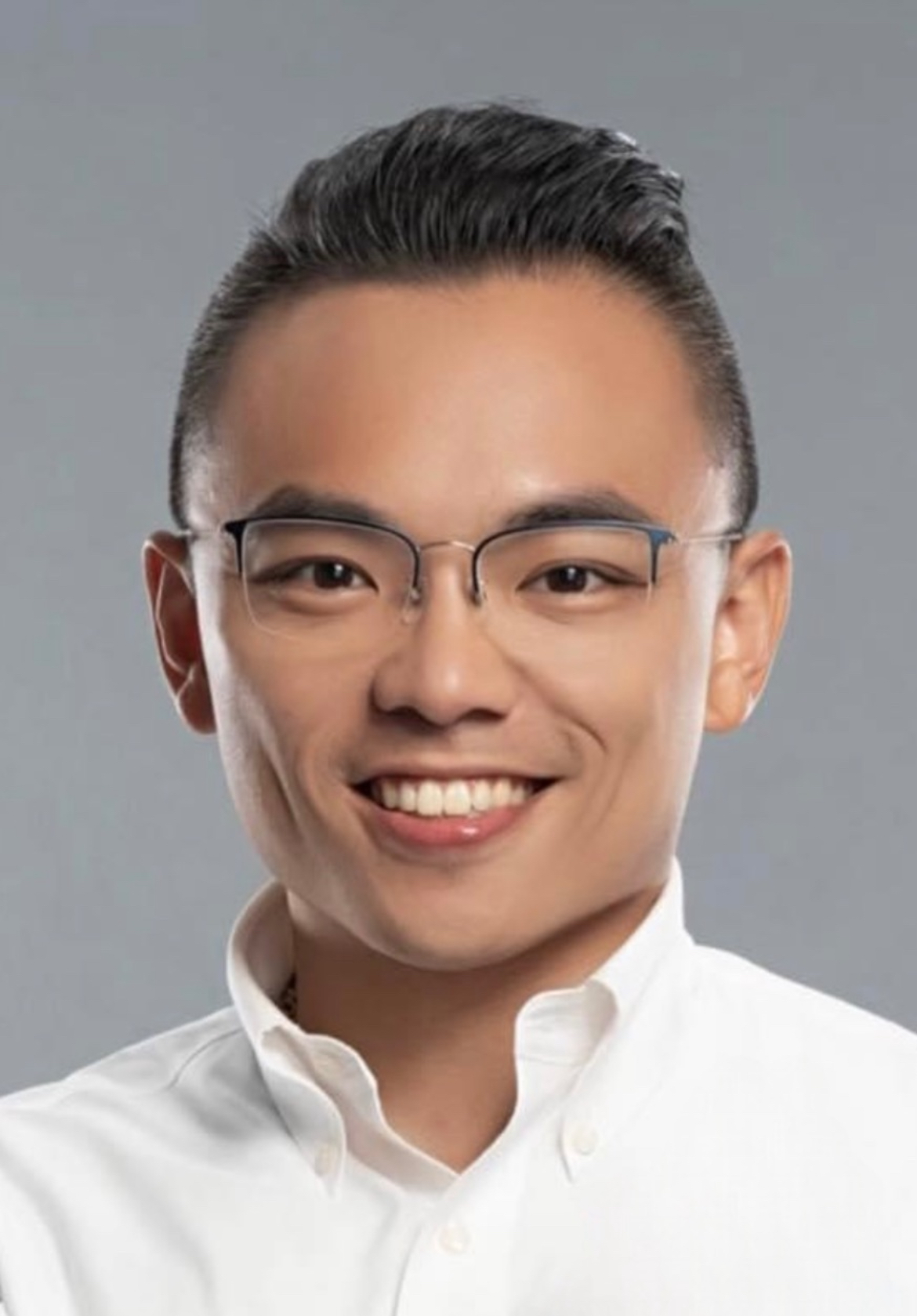
- Official portrait, 2024

Member of the Legislative Yuan
- Incumbent
- Assumed office 1 February 2020
- Leader: Fu Kun-chi
- Preceded by: Lu Sun-ling
- Constituency: New Taipei 1

Legislative Yuan Majority Secretary-General
- In office 1 February 2024 – 31 August 2024
- Preceded by: Cheng Yun-peng
- Succeeded by: Lin Szu-ming

22nd Chairperson of the Cultural Communication Commission of Kuomintang
- In office 30 August 2022 – 3 May 2023
- Chairman: Eric Chu
- Preceded by: Wang Yu-min
- Succeeded by: Lin Kuang-yu

Personal details
- Born: January 1, 1983 (age 43) Taipei, Taiwan
- Party: Kuomintang
- Parent(s): Kuo Su-chun (mother; former legislator)
- Education: Yuan Ze University (BA); University of Southern California (MPA); National Taiwan University (MA)

Hung Mong-kai (Chinese: 洪孟楷; pinyin: Hóng Mèngkǎi; born 1 January 1983) is a Taiwanese politician who has served as a member of the Legislative Yuan representing New Taipei City Constituency 1 since 2020.

== Early life and education ==
Hung was born on January 1, 1983, in Taipei, Taiwan. His parents are Hung Hsi-yao, a former chairman of the Taiwan Salt company, and Kuo Su-chun, a former member of the Legislative Yuan. Kuo entered politics while Hung was in elementary school, serving as a representative in the National Assembly, and her political work reduced the amount of time she spent at home with him.

Hung began working at age 15, taking jobs at convenience stores and coffee shops. By high school, he sometimes accompanied his mother to political and constituency events. After high school, he graduated from Yuan Ze University with a bachelor's degree in business administration in 2005. While attending university, he worked as an English tutor and cram-school teacher and spent two and a half years hosting a program on a local radio station. After graduation, he served in the Republic of China Military Police and graduated ranked first in the service's 704th training class.

Hung later earned a master's degree in public policy from the University of Southern California. He also earned a master's degree in political science from National Taiwan University in 2018. He wrote his master's thesis at NTU under the supervision of political scientist Su Tsai-tsu.

== Early career ==
Hung worked as a legislative assistant before entering local government. After completing graduate studies in the United States, his first public-sector position was as a secretary in the office of Taipei County deputy magistrate Tsai Chia-fu. After Tsai left office, Chiayi mayor Huang Min-hui recruited Hung to work for the Chiayi city government, where he served for six months as a confidential secretary in Huang's office before being offered the vacant position of director of the city's Cultural Affairs Bureau. Hung was formally appointed director of the Chiayi City Government Cultural Affairs Bureau in October 2011. He was 28 years old when he became cultural affairs director.

During his tenure in Chiayi, Hung was involved in organizing a New Year's Eve event at the city's Central Fountain and in efforts to bring director Wei Te-sheng's film Kano to Chiayi for filming. He then served as a specialist committee member in the office of Premier Jiang Yi-huah. Hung later became a deputy director of the Kuomintang's Culture and Communications Committee and served as a party spokesperson.

== Legislative Yuan ==
=== First term, 2020–2024 ===
In 2019, Hung sought the Kuomintang nomination for the New Taipei City first constituency and defeated former legislator Wu Yu-sheng in the party primary. The constituency comprises the districts of Tamsui, Bali, Linkou, Taishan, Sanzhi, and Shimen. In the January 2020 legislative election, Hung received 119,401 votes and defeated incumbent Democratic Progressive Party legislator Lu Sun-ling, who received 110,162 votes. He took office as a member of the 10th Legislative Yuan on February 1, 2020.

Hung served on the Legislative Yuan's Transportation Committee during all eight sessions of the 10th Legislative Yuan. He was elected a convener of the Transportation Committee during its fifth session and also served on the Discipline Committee during that session. In March 2022, while serving as Transportation Committee convener, Hung scheduled a committee hearing at which the National Communications Commission was asked to report on controversies surrounding the licensing and management of Mirror News. During his first term he also served as a deputy secretary of the Kuomintang caucus in the Legislative Yuan.

On August 30, 2022, the Kuomintang appointed Hung chairman of its Culture and Communications Committee, succeeding Wang Yu-min, who had entered the 2022 local election campaign in Chiayi County. Hung stepped down as Culture and Communications Committee chairman on May 3, 2023, after the Kuomintang nominated him to seek reelection in New Taipei City's first constituency. He remained a member of the Kuomintang Central Standing Committee after leaving the communications post.

=== Second term, 2024–present ===
Hung was re-elected to the Legislative Yuan in the January 2024 election with 158,596 votes, or 58.71 percent of the vote. His 158,596 votes were the largest raw vote total received by any elected legislator in the 2024 election. He began his second term as a member of the 11th Legislative Yuan on February 1, 2024.

Shortly before the new legislature convened, the Kuomintang caucus selected Hung as its secretary-general for the first session of the 11th Legislative Yuan, alongside caucus whip Fu Kun-chi and chief deputy secretary-general Lin Szu-ming. Hung served on the Education and Culture Committee during the first and second sessions of the 11th Legislative Yuan and also sat on the Procedure Committee during the first session. He left the caucus secretary-general position before the second session, when Lin Szu-ming succeeded him in the post.

Beginning with the third session, Hung returned to the Transportation Committee. He served as one of the committee's conveners during the fourth session and remained a Transportation Committee member during the fifth session in 2026.

In 2025, voters in Hung's constituency initiated a recall effort against him. The recall petition's stated grounds included criticism of legislation Hung had proposed or co-sponsored, his role in reductions to government budget items, his positions on cross-strait and national-security issues, and his conduct as a legislator; Hung rejected the allegations in his formal response and defended his legislative and constituency record. The recall vote was held on July 26, 2025. The proposal was defeated, with 94,808 votes in favor of recalling Hung and 121,592 votes against, while the number of votes in favor also fell below the statutory threshold of one-quarter of eligible voters.

== Personal Life ==
He occasionally gained media exposure because of his bodybuilding efforts.
