= Su Chiao-hui =

Taiwanese politician and lawyer

Su Chiao-hui MLY
- 蘇巧慧
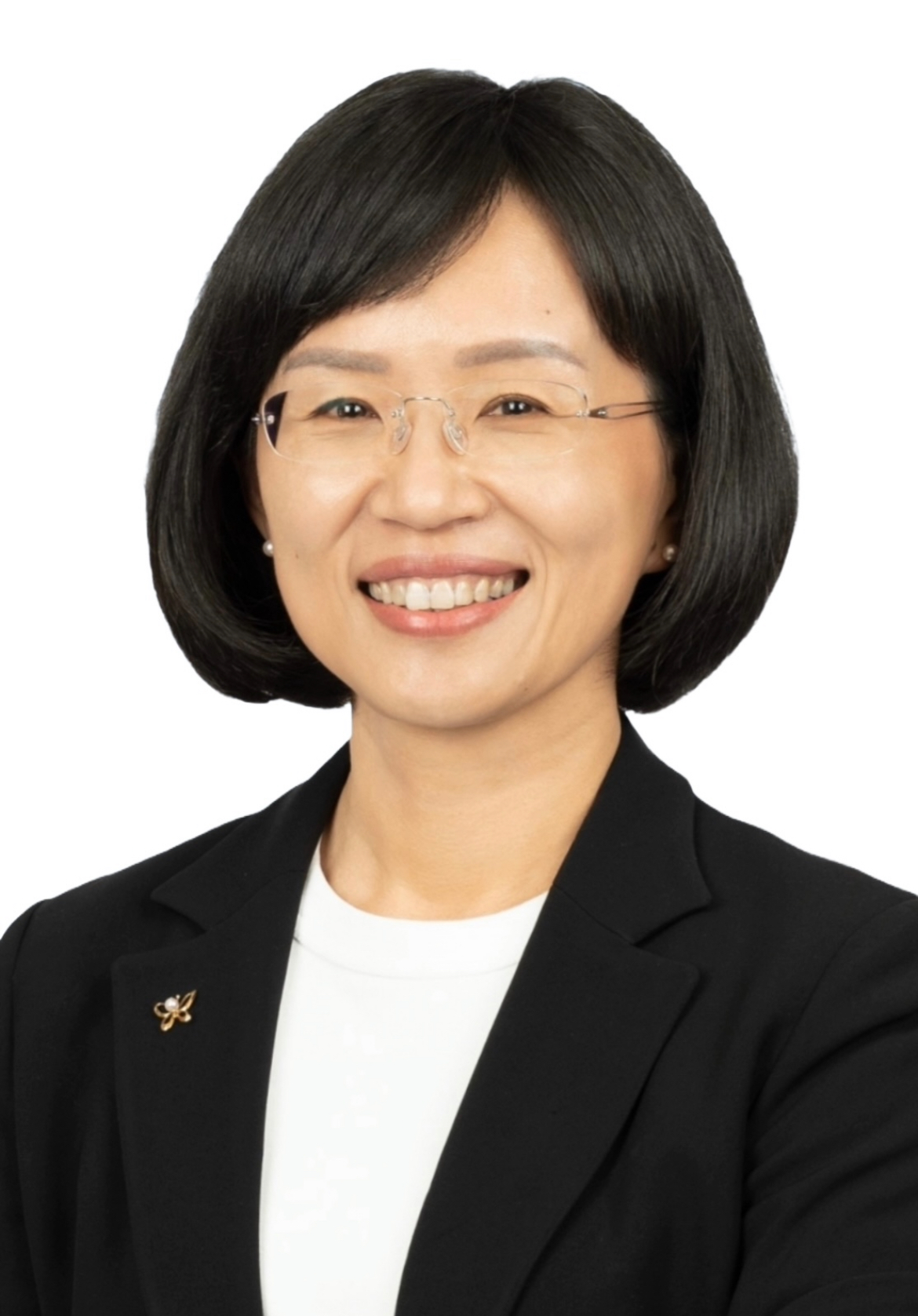
- Official portrait, 2023

Member of the Legislative Yuan
- Incumbent
- Assumed office 1 February 2016
- Preceded by: Huang Chih-hsiung
- Constituency: New Taipei V

5th Head of the New Taipei Branch of the Democratic Progressive Party
- Incumbent
- Assumed office 7 June 2024
- Chairman: Lai Ching-te
- Preceded by: Ho Po-wen

Personal details
- Born: 5 April 1976 (age 50) Pingtung County, Taiwan
- Party: Democratic Progressive Party
- Spouse: Lungnan Isak Fangas (m. 2008)
- Children: 2
- Parent: Su Tseng-chang (father)
- Education: National Taiwan University (LLB); Boston University (LLM); University of Pennsylvania (LLM, SJD)

Su Chiao-hui (Chinese: 蘇巧慧; pinyin: Sū Qiǎohuì; Pe̍h-ōe-jī: So͘ Kháu-hūi; 5 April 1976) is a Taiwanese lawyer, legal scholar, and politician who is currently a member of the Legislative Yuan.

== Early life and education ==
Su was born on 5 April 1976. She grew up in New Taipei City and is the daughter of Su Tseng-chang, who later served as premier. From the age of five, Su accompanied her father during election campaigns, where she distributed campaign leaflets. She has two younger sisters: Su Chiao-chun, a creative arts designer, and Su Chiao-ning, a professor at Oakland University. Like her sisters, Su graduated from Taipei First Girls' High School.

After high school, Su studied law and sociology at National Taiwan University and graduated with a Bachelor of Laws (LL.B.) degree. She then completed graduate studies in the United States at Boston University, where she earned an LL.M. degree from the Boston University School of Law, and the University of Pennsylvania, where she earned a second LL.M. in 2007 and a Doctor of Juridical Science (S.J.D.) in 2011 from the University of Pennsylvania Law School.

== Legal career ==
Su Chiao-hui was a trial lawyer who did pro bono work for people in poverty. While working for Formosa Transnational Attorneys at Law, a firm founded by Fan Kuang-chun and John Chen, Su was mentored by Wellington Koo. She has also served as executive director of her father's Eball Foundation starting in 2012.

== Political career ==
Su defeated Ou Chin-shih and Liao Yi-kun in a Democratic Progressive Party primary held in March 2015 to win her party's nomination for the fifth constituency of New Taipei City. She defeated Kuomintang incumbent Huang Chih-hsiung, who had held the seat for three terms.

Legislative Election 2016: New Taipei 5th district
Party	Candidate	Votes	%	±%
DPP	Su Chiao-hui	92,237	56.11	
KMT	Huang Chih-hsiung	67,014	40.77	
NPP	Kuo Po-yu	5,130	3.12	
Majority		25,223	15.34	
Total valid votes		164,381	98.83	
Rejected ballots		1,940	1.17	
DPP gain from KMT		Swing		
Turnout		166,321	68.16	
Registered electors		244,030		

== Personal life ==
Su is the eldest daughter of the former Prime Minister (President of the Executive Yuan) of Taiwan, Su Tseng-chang and Chan Hsiu-ling. Su's husband, Lungnan Isak Fangas, is an Amis filmmaker.
