= New Taipei City Constituency 1 =

Constituency of the Legislative Yuan of Taiwan

- Single-member constituency for the Legislative Yuan
- District(s): Shimen, Sanzhi, Tamsui, Bali, Linkou, Taishan
- Electorate: 387,634 (2024 election)

Current constituency
- Created: 2008 (as Taipei County Constituency 1); 2010 (current name)
- Party: KMT
- Member: Hung Mong-kai

New Taipei City Constituency 1 (Chinese: 新北市第一選舉區; pinyin: Xīnběi Shì Dìyī Xuǎnjǔ Qū) is one of the 73 regional constituencies represented in the Legislative Yuan, the national legislature of Taiwan. It was created in 2008 (as Taipei County Constituency 1) following a series of constitutional reforms, and elects one legislator, through first-past-the-post voting, to the Legislative Yuan. It has been represented by Hung Mong-kai of the Kuomintang since 2020.

== Legislators ==
Election	Legislator	Party
2008 - 2016	Wu Yu-sheng	Kuomintang
2016 - 2020	Lu Sun-ling	Democratic Progressive Party
2020	Hung Mong-kai	Kuomintang

== Election results ==

=== 2008 (Note: Named Taipei County Constituency 1, boundaries unchanged.) ===
2008 Taiwanese legislative election: Taipei County 1
Candidate	Party	Votes	%
Wu Yu-sheng	Kuomintang	82,949	58.38
Li Hsien-jung	Democratic Progressive Party	56,594	39.83
Chuang Meng-hsueh	Taiwan Solidarity Union	1,598	1.12
Wu Chin-chih	Third Society Party	366	0.26
Yang Jen-ching	Hakka Party	325	0.23
Wang Tien-yu	Red Party	242	0.17
Total		142,074	100.00
Valid votes		142,074	98.67
Invalid/blank votes		1,909	1.33
Total votes		143,983	100.00
Registered voters/turnout		247,852	58.09
Majority		26,355	18.55
Kuomintang win (new seat)			

=== 2012 ===
* denotes the incumbent legislator

2012 Taiwanese legislative election: New Taipei 1
Candidate	Party	Votes	%	+/–
Wu Yu-sheng*	Kuomintang	107,821	50.78	▼7.60
Ho Po-wen	Democratic Progressive Party	90,125	42.44	▲2.61
Yu Tsung-pei	People First Party	9,359	4.41	NEW
Wang Chung-ming	Green Party Taiwan	5,038	2.37	NEW
Total		212,343	100.00	–
Valid votes		212,343	98.62	
Invalid/blank votes		2,966	1.38	
Total votes		215,309	100.00	
Registered voters/turnout		288,221	74.70	
Majority		17,696	8.34	
Kuomintang hold				

=== 2016 ===
* denotes the incumbent legislator

2016 Taiwanese legislative election: New Taipei 1
Candidate	Party	Votes	%	+/–
Lu Sun-ling	Democratic Progressive Party	110,243	53.28	▲10.84
Wu Yu-sheng*	Kuomintang	84,582	40.88	▼9.90
Su Tung-ta	Trees Party	5,114	2.47	NEW
Chen Li-chi	Independent	4,864	2.35	NEW
Hung Chih-cheng	National Health Service Alliance	1,385	0.67	NEW
Chen Yun-fen	Peace Dove Alliance Party	736	0.36	NEW
Total		206,924	100.00	–
Valid votes		206,924	97.69	
Invalid/blank votes		4,902	2.31	
Total votes		211,826	100.00	
Registered voters/turnout		322,726	65.64	
Majority		25,661	12.4	
Democratic Progressive Party gain from Kuomintang				

=== 2020 ===
* denotes the incumbent legislator

2020 Taiwanese legislative election: New Taipei 1
Candidate	Party	Votes	%	+/–
Hung Mong-kai	Kuomintang	119,401	46.40	▲5.52
Lu Sun-ling*	Democratic Progressive Party	110,162	42.81	▼10.47
Chang Wei-hang	New Power Party	19,641	7.63	NEW
Yu Chang-hsin	Green Party Taiwan	3,663	1.42	NEW
Chen Chao-hung	Independent	2,579	1.00	NEW
Ou Chung-ching	Independent	892	0.35	NEW
Chang Li-yin	Independent	604	0.23	NEW
Chen Jung-tai	Taiwan Rehabilitation Therapists Alliance (Labour Party)	366	0.14	NEW
Total		257,308	100.00	–
Valid votes		257,308	98.36	
Invalid/blank votes		4,278	1.64	
Total votes		261,586	100.00	
Registered voters/turnout		355,104	73.66	
Majority		9,239	3.59	
Kuomintang gain from Democratic Progressive Party				

=== 2024 ===
* denotes the incumbent legislator

2024 Taiwanese legislative election: New Taipei 1
Candidate	Party	Votes	%	+/–
Hung Mong-kai*	Kuomintang	158,596	58.71	▲12.31
Ho Po-wen	Democratic Progressive Party	106,454	39.41	▼3.40
Hsu Pai-ti	Taiwan Renewal Party	2,633	0.97	NEW
Yu Ching-chih	Institutional Island of Saving the World	1,867	0.69	NEW
Weng Teng-yuan	Chinese Unification Promotion Party	570	0.21	NEW
Total		270,120	100.00	–
Valid votes		270,120	97.19	
Invalid/blank votes		7,820	2.81	
Total votes		277,940	100.00	
Registered voters/turnout		387,634	71.70	
Majority		52,142	19.3	
Kuomintang hold				
