= 9th Legislative Yuan =

←	8th	10th	→

Overview
- Legislative body: Legislative Yuan
- Jurisdiction: Taiwan
- Meeting place: Legislative Yuan Building
- Term: 1 February 2016 – 31 January 2020
- Election: 2016 Taiwanese legislative election
- Government: Executive Yuan of Lin Chuan; Executive Yuan of William Lai; Second Executive Yuan of Su Tseng-chang
- Members: 113
- Speaker: Su Jia-chyuan (DPP)
- Deputy Speaker: Tsai Chi-chang
- Secretary General: Lin Chih-chia
- Majority Leader: Ker Chien-ming (DPP)
- Minority Leader: Johnny Chiang (KMT)

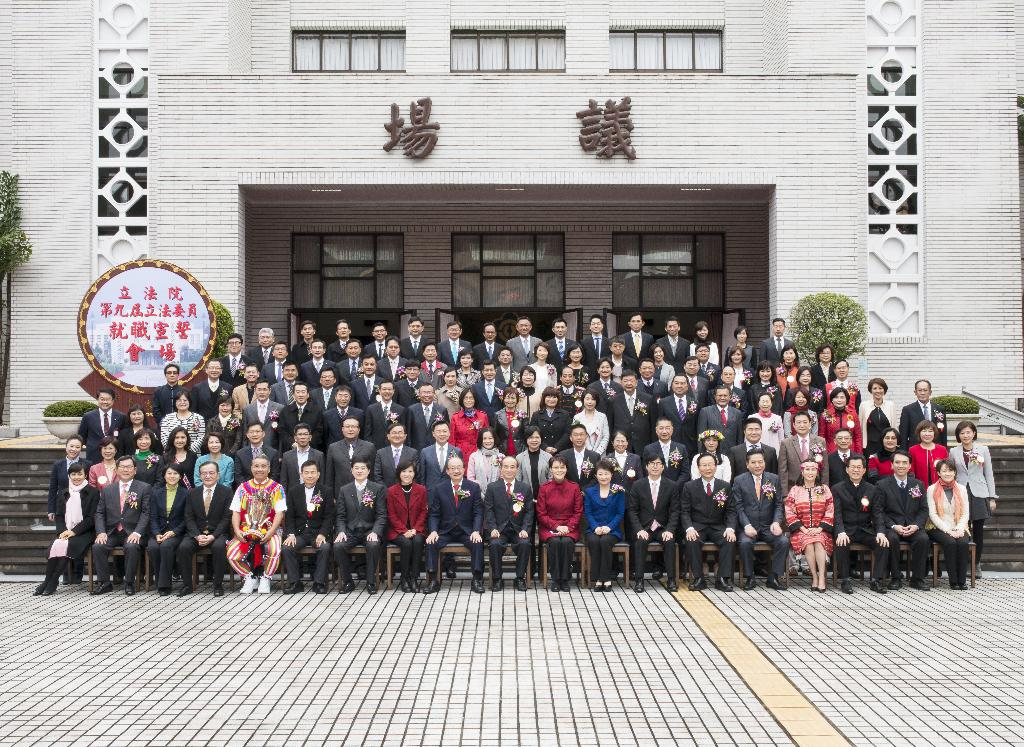
9th Legislative Yuan members on February 1, 2016.

Seat composition for the 9th Legislative Yuan DPP (68) KMT (35) NPP (5) PFP (3) NPSU (1) Independent (1)

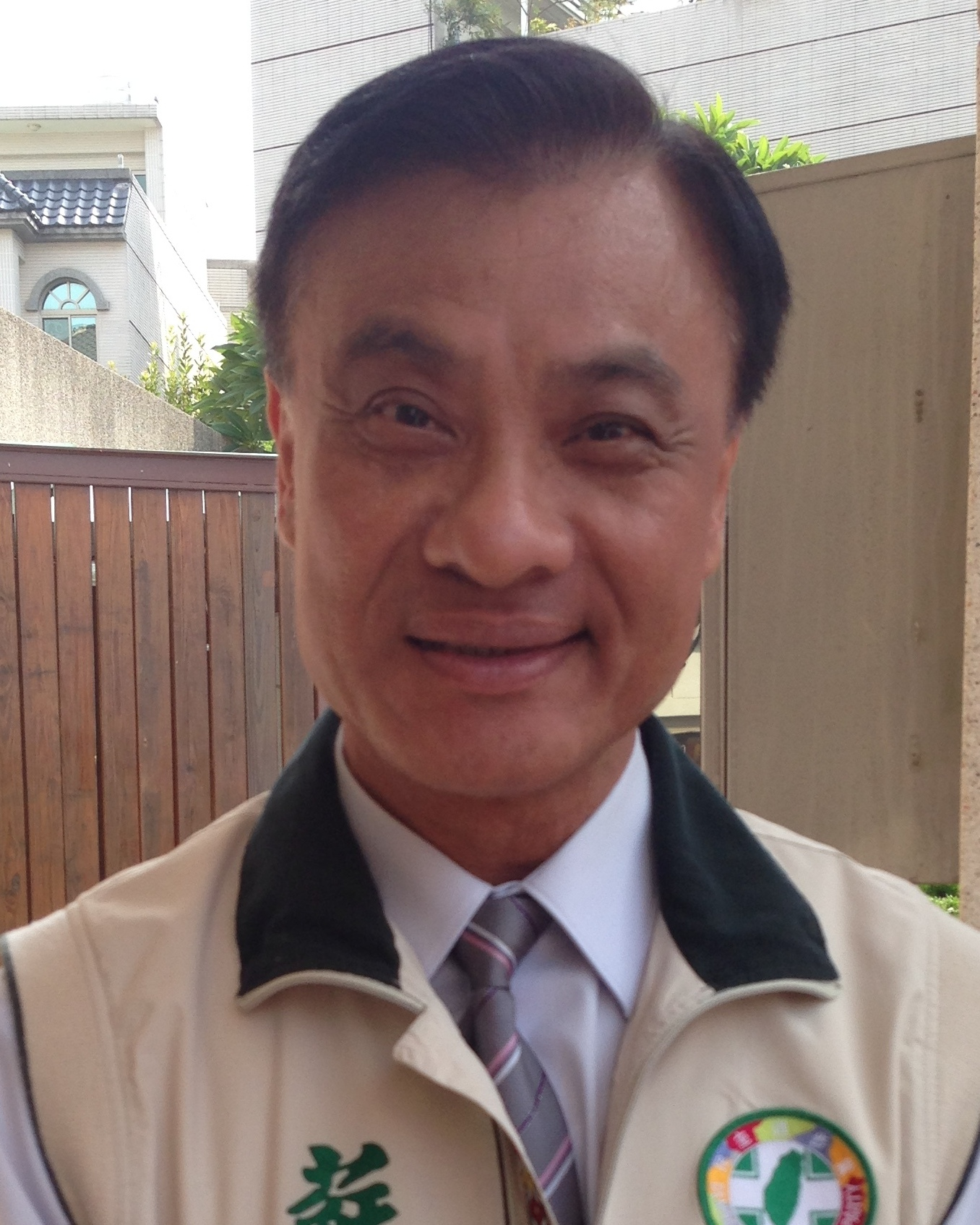
Su Jia-chyuan (DPP), speaker of Legislative Yuan (Party list)

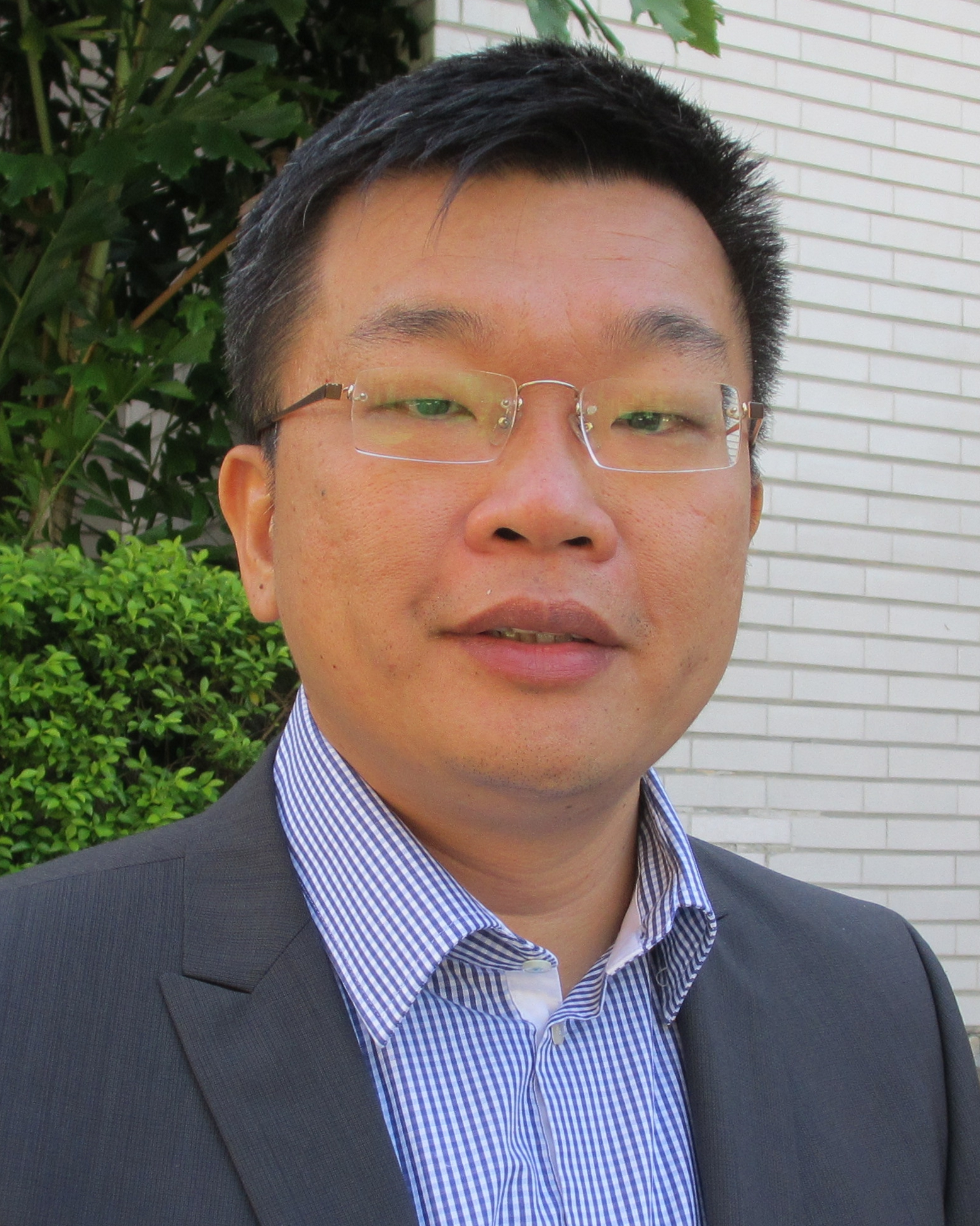
Tsai Chi-chang (DPP), deputy speaker of Legislative Yuan (Taichung 1)

The 9th Legislative Yuan was a term of members of the Legislative Yuan of Taiwan, from 1 February 2016 to 31 January 2020. Members were elected in the 16 January 2016 legislative election. The ruling Democratic Progressive Party control the Legislative Yuan for the first time. The next legislative election was held on January 11, 2020 for the Tenth Legislative Yuan.

The list is arranged by single-member constituency (district) and party-list proportional representation.

== Single-member constituency ==
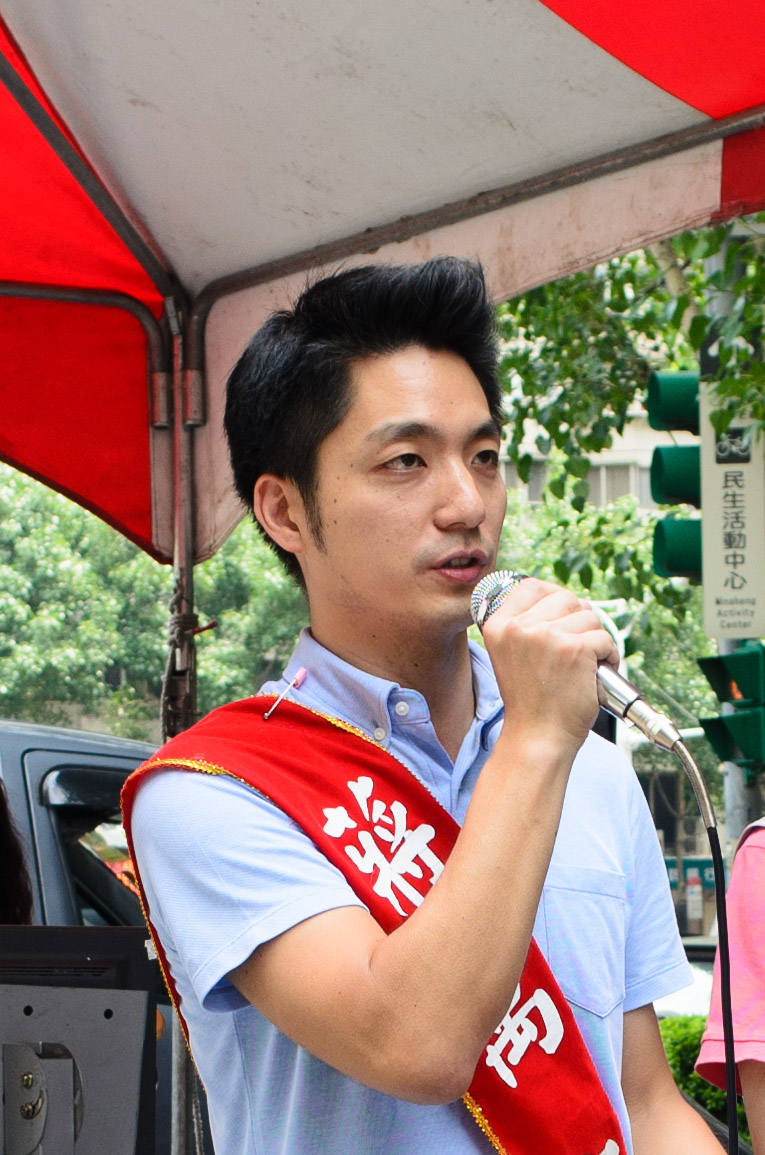
Chiang Wan-an (KMT, Taipei 3)

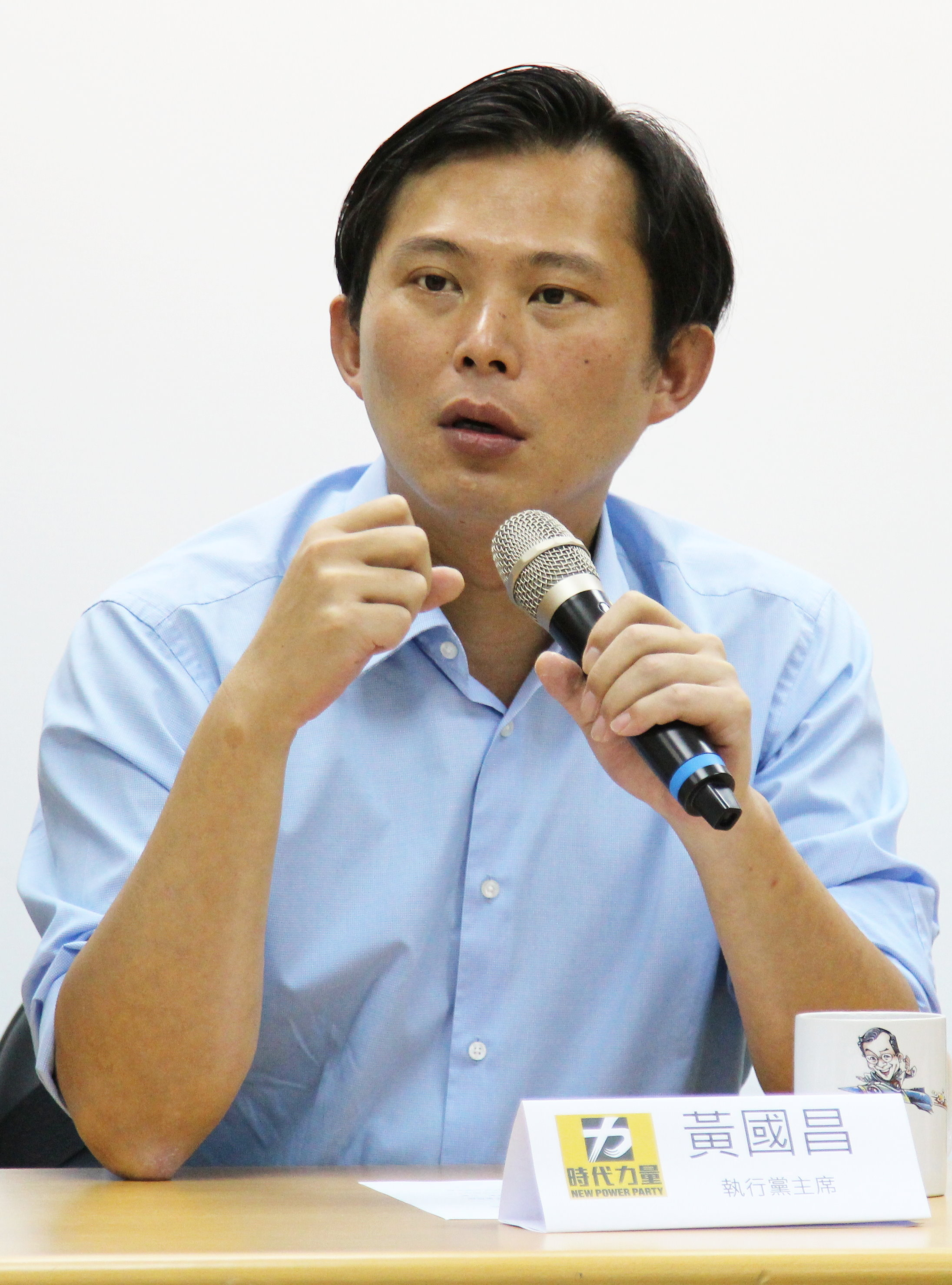
Huang Kuo-chang (NPP, New Taipei 12)

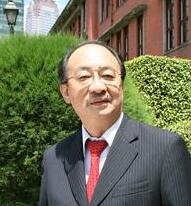
Ker Chien-ming (DPP, Hsinchu City). Leader of the DPP in the Legislative Yuan.

Constituency		Name	Pinyin	Chinese	Party
Changhua County	1st	Ko Cheng-fang		柯呈坊	Kuomintang
Changhua County	2nd	Huang Hsiu-fang	Huáng Xiùfāng	黃秀芳	Democratic Progressive Party
Changhua County	3rd	Hung Chin-yi	Hóng Zōngyì	洪宗熠	Democratic Progressive Party
Changhua County	4th	Chen Su-yueh	Chén Sùyuè	陳素月	Democratic Progressive Party
Chiayi City		Lee Chun-yi	Lǐ Jùnyì	李俊俋	Democratic Progressive Party
Chiayi County	1st	Tsai Yi-yu	Cài Yìyú	蔡易餘	Democratic Progressive Party
Chiayi County	2nd	Chen Ming-wen	Chén Míngwén	陳明文	Democratic Progressive Party
Hsinchu City		Ker Chien-ming	Kē Jiànmíng	柯建銘	Democratic Progressive Party
Hsinchu County		Lin Wei-chou	Lín Wèizhōu	林為洲	Kuomintang
Hualien County		Hsiao Bi-khim	Xiāo Měiqín	蕭美琴	Democratic Progressive Party
Kaohsiung City	1st	Chiu Yi-ying	Qiū Yìyíng	邱議瑩	Democratic Progressive Party
Kaohsiung City	2nd	Chiu Chih-wei	Qiū Zhìwěi	邱志偉	Democratic Progressive Party
Kaohsiung City	3rd	Liu Shyh-fang	Liú Shìfāng	劉世芳	Democratic Progressive Party
Kaohsiung City	4th	Lin Tai-hua	Lín Dàihuà	林岱樺	Democratic Progressive Party
Kaohsiung City	5th	Kuan Bi-ling	Guǎn Bìlíng	管碧玲	Democratic Progressive Party
Kaohsiung City	6th	Lee Kun-tse	Lǐ Kūnzé	李昆澤	Democratic Progressive Party
Kaohsiung City	7th	Chao Tien-lin	Zhào Tiānlín	趙天麟	Democratic Progressive Party
Kaohsiung City	8th	Hsu Chih-chieh	Xǔ Zhìjié	許智傑	Democratic Progressive Party
Kaohsiung City	9th	Lai Jui-lung	Lài Ruìlóng	賴瑞隆	Democratic Progressive Party
Keelung		Tsai Shih-ying	Cài Shìyìng	蔡適應	Democratic Progressive Party
Kinmen County		Yang Cheng-wu (resigned) Chen Yu-jen (by-election)	Yáng Zhènwú Chén Yùzhēn	楊鎮浯 陳玉珍	Kuomintang
Lienchiang County		Chen Hsueh-sheng	Chén Xuěshēng	陳雪生	Kuomintang
Miaoli County	1st	Chen Chao-ming	Chén Chāomíng	陳超明	Kuomintang
Miaoli County	2nd	Hsu Chih-jung	Xú Zhìróng	徐志榮	Kuomintang
Nantou County	1st	Ma Wen-chun	Mǎ Wénjūn	馬文君	Kuomintang
Nantou County	2nd	Hsu Shu-hua	Xǔ Shūhuá	許淑華	Kuomintang
New Taipei City	1st	Lu Sun-ling	Lǚ Sūnlíng	呂孫綾	Democratic Progressive Party
New Taipei City	2nd	Lin Shu-fen	Lín Shūfēn	林淑芬	Democratic Progressive Party
New Taipei City	3rd	Yu Tian	Yú Tiān	余天	Democratic Progressive Party
New Taipei City	4th	Wu Ping-jui	Wú Bǐngruì	吳秉叡	Democratic Progressive Party
New Taipei City	5th	Su Chiao-hui	Sū Qiǎohuì	蘇巧慧	Democratic Progressive Party
New Taipei City	6th	Chang Hung-lu	Zhāng Hónglù	張宏陸	Democratic Progressive Party
New Taipei City	7th	Lo Chih-cheng	Luó Zhìzhèng	羅致政	Democratic Progressive Party
New Taipei City	8th	Chiang Yung-chang	Jiāng Yǒngchāng	江永昌	Democratic Progressive Party
New Taipei City	9th	Lin Te-fu	Lín Défú	林德福	Kuomintang
New Taipei City	10th	Wu Chi-ming	Wú Qímíng	吳琪銘	Democratic Progressive Party
New Taipei City	11th	Lo Ming-tsai	Luó Míngcái	羅明才	Kuomintang
New Taipei City	12th	Huang Kuo-chang	Huáng Guóchāng	黃國昌	New Power Party
Penghu County		Yang Yao	Yáng Yào	楊曜	Democratic Progressive Party
Pingtung County	1st	Su Chen-ching	Sū Zhènqīng	蘇震清	Democratic Progressive Party
Pingtung County	2nd	Chung Chia-pin	Zhōng Jiābīn	鍾佳濱	Democratic Progressive Party
Pingtung County	3rd	Chuang Jui-hsiung	Zhuāng Ruìxióng	莊瑞雄	Democratic Progressive Party
Taichung City	1st	Tsai Chi-chang	Cài Qíchāng	蔡其昌	Democratic Progressive Party
Taichung City	2nd	Yen Kuan-heng	Yán Kuānhéng	顏寬恒	Kuomintang
Taichung City	3rd	Hung Tzu-yung	Hóng Cíyōng	洪慈庸	New Power Party/Independent
Taichung City	4th	Chang Liao Wan-chien	Zhāng-Liào Wànjiān	張廖萬堅	Democratic Progressive Party
Taichung City	5th	Shen Chih-hwei	Shĕn Zhìhuì	沈智慧	Kuomintang
Taichung City	6th	Huang Kuo-shu	Huáng Guóshū	黃國書	Democratic Progressive Party
Taichung City	7th	Ho Hsin-chun	Hé Xīnchún	何欣純	Democratic Progressive Party
Taichung City	8th	Johnny Chiang	Jiāng Qǐchén	江啟臣	Kuomintang
Tainan City	1st	Yeh Yi-jin	Yè Yíjīn	葉宜津	Democratic Progressive Party
Tainan City	2nd	Kuo Kuo-wen	Guō Guówén	郭國文	Democratic Progressive Party
Tainan City	3rd	Chen Ting-fei	Chén Tíngfēi	陳亭妃	Democratic Progressive Party
Tainan City	4th	Lin Chun-hsien	Lín Jùnxiàn	林俊憲	Democratic Progressive Party
Tainan City	5th	Wang Ting-yu	Wáng Dìngyǔ	王定宇	Democratic Progressive Party
Taipei City	1st	Rosalia Wu	Wú Sīyáo	吳思瑤	Democratic Progressive Party
Taipei City	2nd	Ho Chih-wei	He Zhìwěi	何志偉	Democratic Progressive Party
Taipei City	3rd	Chiang Wan-an	Jiǎng Wàn'ān	蔣萬安	Kuomintang
Taipei City	4th	Lee Yen-hsiu	Lǐ Yànxiù	李彥秀	Kuomintang
Taipei City	5th	Freddy Lim	Lín Chǎngzuǒ	林昶佐	New Power Party/Independent
Taipei City	6th	Chiang Nai-shin	Jiǎng Nǎixīn	蔣乃辛	Kuomintang
Taipei City	7th	Alex Fai	Fèi Hóngtài	費鴻泰	Kuomintang
Taipei City	8th	Lai Shyh-bao	Lài Shìbǎo	賴士葆	Kuomintang
Taitung County		Liu Chao-hao	Liú Zhàoháo	劉櫂豪	Democratic Progressive Party
Taoyuan City	1st	Cheng Yun-peng	Zhèng Yùnpéng	鄭運鵬	Democratic Progressive Party
Taoyuan City	2nd	Chen Lai Su-mei	Chén-Lài Sùměi	陳賴素美	Democratic Progressive Party
Taoyuan City	3rd	Apollo Chen	Chén Xuéshèng	陳學聖	Kuomintang
Taoyuan City	4th	Cheng Pao-ching	Zhèng Bǎoqīng	鄭寶清	Democratic Progressive Party
Taoyuan City	5th	Lu Yu-ling	Lǚ Yùlíng	呂玉玲	Kuomintang
Taoyuan City	6th	Chao Cheng-yu	Zhào Zhèngyǔ	趙正宇	Independent
Yilan County		Chen Ou-po	Chén Ōupò	陳歐珀	Democratic Progressive Party
Yunlin County	1st	Su Chih-fen	Sū Zhìfēn	蘇治芬	Democratic Progressive Party
Yunlin County	2nd	Liu Chien-kuo	Liú Jiànguó	劉建國	Democratic Progressive Party
Lowland Aborigine (3 seats)		Jeng Tian-Tsair (Sra Kacaw)	Zhèng Tiāncái	鄭天財	Kuomintang
Lowland Aborigine (3 seats)		Chen Ying (Asenay Daliyalrep)	Chén Yíng	陳瑩	Democratic Progressive Party
Lowland Aborigine (3 seats)		Liao Kuo-tung (Sufin Siluko)	Liào Guódòng	廖國棟	Kuomintang
Highland Aborigine (3 seats)		Kung Wen-chi (Yosi Takun)	Kǒng Wénjí	孔文吉	Kuomintang
Highland Aborigine (3 seats)		Chien Tung-ming (Uliw Qaljupayare)	Jiǎn Dōngmíng	簡東明	Kuomintang
Highland Aborigine (3 seats)		Kao Chin Su-mei (Ciwas Ali)	Gāo-Jīn Sùméi	高金素梅	Non-Partisan Solidarity Union

== Party-list Proportional Representation ==
Democratic Progressive Party
№	Name	Pinyin	Chinese	Party
1	Wu Kuen-yuh	Wú Kūnyù	吳焜裕	Democratic Progressive Party
2	Wu Yu-chin	Wú Yùqín	吳玉琴	Democratic Progressive Party
3	Chen Man-li	Chén Mànlì	陳曼麗	Democratic Progressive Party
5	Frida Tsai	Cài Péihuì	蔡培慧	Democratic Progressive Party
6	Wang Jung-chang	Wáng Róngzhāng	王榮璋	Democratic Progressive Party
8	Karen Yu	Yú Wǎnrú	余宛如	Democratic Progressive Party
9	Su Jia-chyuan	Sū Jiāquán	蘇嘉全	Democratic Progressive Party
10	Tuan Yi-kang	Duàn Yíkāng	段宜康	Democratic Progressive Party
13	Yu Mei-nu	Yóu Měinǚ	尤美女	Democratic Progressive Party
14	Lee Ying-yuan	Lǐ Yīngyuán	李應元	Democratic Progressive Party
16	Lin Ching-yi	Lín Jìngyí	林靜儀	Democratic Progressive Party
18	Chou Chun-mi	Zhōu Chūnmǐ	周春米	Democratic Progressive Party
19	Shih Yi-fang	Shī Yìfāng	施義芳	Democratic Progressive Party
20	Lee Li-feng	Lǐ Lìfēn	李麗芬	Democratic Progressive Party
21	Julian Kuo		郭正亮	Democratic Progressive Party
22	Chiu Tai-yuan		邱泰源	Democratic Progressive Party
23	Chiang Chieh-an		蔣絜安	Democratic Progressive Party
24	Chen Ching-min		陳靜敏	Democratic Progressive Party
Kuomintang
№	Name	Pinyin	Chinese	Party
1	Wang Jin-pyng	Wáng Jīnpíng	王金平	Kuomintang
2	Ko Chih-en	Kē Zhì'ēn	柯志恩	Kuomintang
3	Arthur Chen	Chén Yímín	陳宜民	Kuomintang
4	Lin Li-chan	Lín Lìchán	林麗蟬	Kuomintang
5	Jason Hsu	XǔYùrén	許毓仁	Kuomintang
6	Tseng Ming-chung	Céng Míngzōng	曾銘宗	Kuomintang
7	Huang Chao-shun	Huáng Zhāoshùn	黃昭順	Kuomintang
8	John Wu	Wú Zhìyáng	吳志揚	Kuomintang
12	Alicia Wang	Wáng Yùmǐn	王育敏	Kuomintang
14	Lin Yih-hwa		林奕華	Kuomintang
15	Jennifer Tung		童惠珍	Kuomintang
People First Party
№	Name	Pinyin	Chinese	Party
1	Lee Hung-chun	Lǐ Hóngjūn	李鴻鈞	People First Party
2	Chen Yi-chieh	Chén Yíjié	陳怡潔	People First Party
3	Chou Chen Hsiu-hsia	Zhōu Chén Xiùxiá	周陳秀霞	People First Party
New Power Party
№	Name	Pinyin	Chinese	Party
1	Jang Show-ling	Zhèng Xiùlíng	鄭秀玲	New Power Party
2	Hsu Yung-ming	Xú Yǒngmíng	徐永明	New Power Party

== Members resigned during tenure ==
Constituency	Name	Pinyin	Chinese	Party	Reason
Nationwide	Cheng Li-chun	Zhèng Lìjūn	鄭麗君	Democratic Progressive Party	Appointed as Minister of Culture (20 May 2016)
Nationwide	Lee Ying-yuan	Lǐ Yīngyuán	李應元	Democratic Progressive Party	Appointed as Minister of Environmental Protection Administration, Executive Yuan (20 May 2016)
Nationwide	Wellington Koo	Gù Lìxióng	顧立雄	Democratic Progressive Party	Appointed as Chairperson of Ill-gotten Party Assets Settlement Committee (1 September 2016)
Nationwide	Hsu Kuo-yung	Xú Guóyǒng	徐國勇	Democratic Progressive Party	Appointed as Spokesperson of Executive Yuan (1 October 2016)
Nationwide	Kolas Yotaka	Gǔlàsī Yóudákǎ	谷辣斯·尤達卡	Democratic Progressive Party	Appointed as Spokesperson of Executive Yuan (16 July 2018)
Nationwide	Chang Li-shan	Zhāng Lìshàn	張麗善	Kuomintang	Running in election (2 November 2018)
Nationwide	Chen Chi-mai	Chén Qímài	陳其邁	Democratic Progressive Party	Running in election (3 November 2018)
Taipei 2nd	Pasuya Yao	Yáo Wénzhì	姚文智	Democratic Progressive Party	Running in election (18 November 2018)
Taichung 5th	Lu Shiow-yen	Lú Xìuyàn	盧秀燕	Kuomintang	Running in election (20 November 2018)
Changhua 1st	Wang Huei-mei	Wáng Huìměi	王惠美	Kuomintang	Elected as Magistrate of Changhua County (25 December 2018)
Tainan 2nd	Huang Wei-cher	Huáng Wěizhé	黃偉哲	Democratic Progressive Party	Elected as Mayor of Tainan City (25 December 2018)
Nationwide	Hsu Chen-wei	Xú Zhēnwèi	徐榛蔚	Kuomintang	Elected as Magistrate of Hualien County (25 December 2018)
Kinmen County	Yang Cheng-wu	Yáng Zhènwú	楊鎮浯	Kuomintang	Elected as Magistrate of Kinmen County (25 December 2018)
New Taipei 3rd	Gao Jyh-peng	Gāo Zhìpéng	高志鵬	Democratic Progressive Party	Removed from office upon conviction (26 December 2018)
Nationwide	Kawlo Iyun Pacidal	Gāolù Yǐyòng Bājǐlá	高潞·以用·巴魕剌	New Power Party	Removed from legislature after revocation of party membership (2 September 2019)
