= 7th Legislative Yuan =

Term of members

←	6th	8th	→

Overview
- Legislative body: Legislative Yuan
- Jurisdiction: Taiwan
- Meeting place: Legislative Yuan Building
- Term: 1 February 2008 – 31 January 2012
- Election: 2008 Taiwanese legislative election
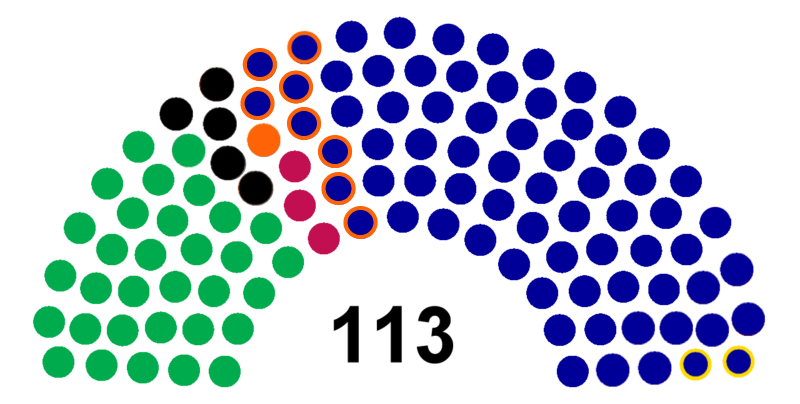
- Members: 113

The 7th Legislative Yuan was a term of members of the Legislative Yuan of Taiwan from 1 February 2008 to 31 January 2012. Members were elected to constituency (district) seats in the 12 January 2008 legislative election. The next legislative election took place in January 2012.

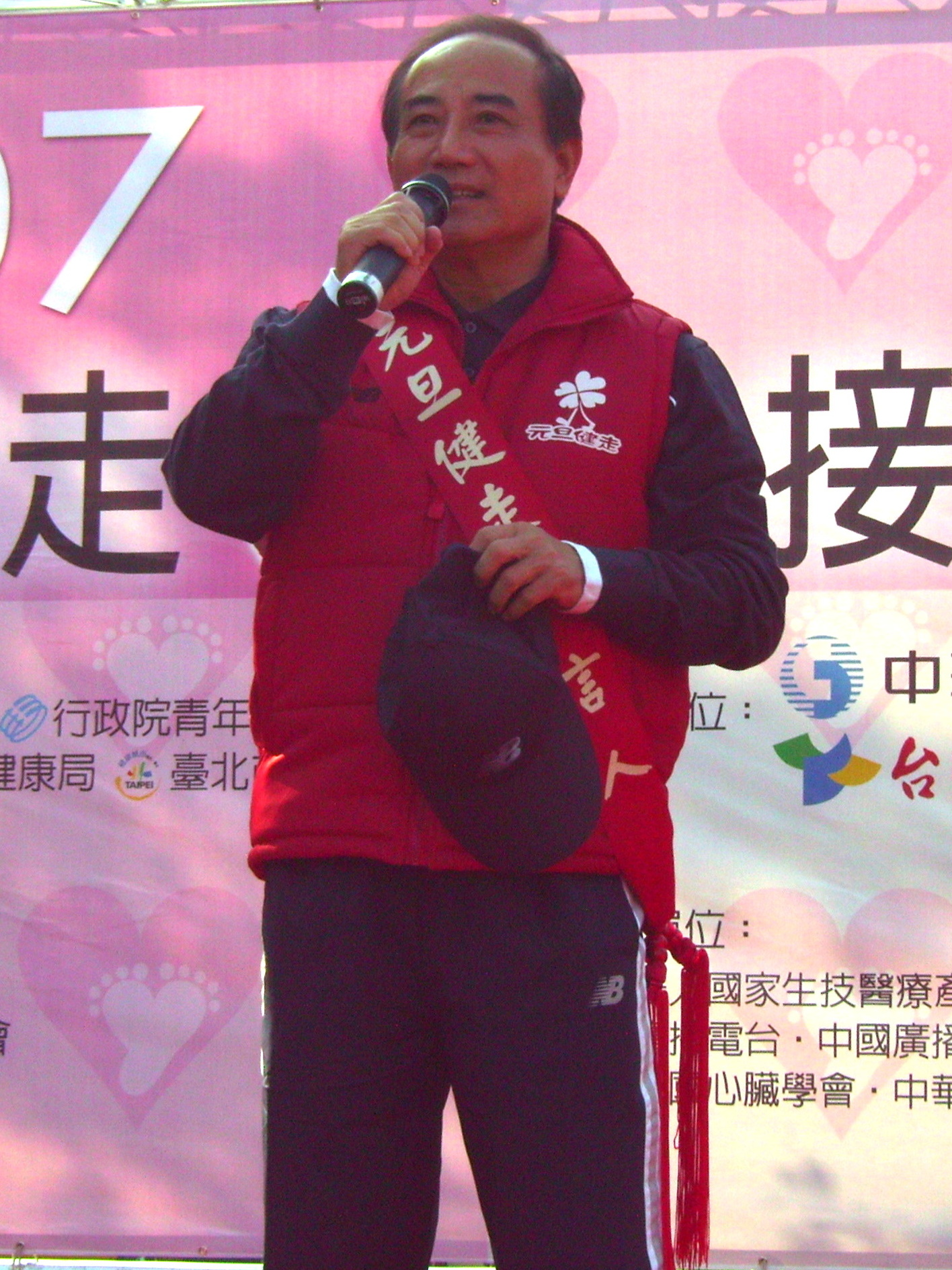
Wang Jin-pyng (KMT), speaker of Legislative Yuan (Party list)

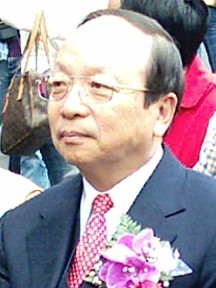
John Chiang (KMT, Taipei City 3)

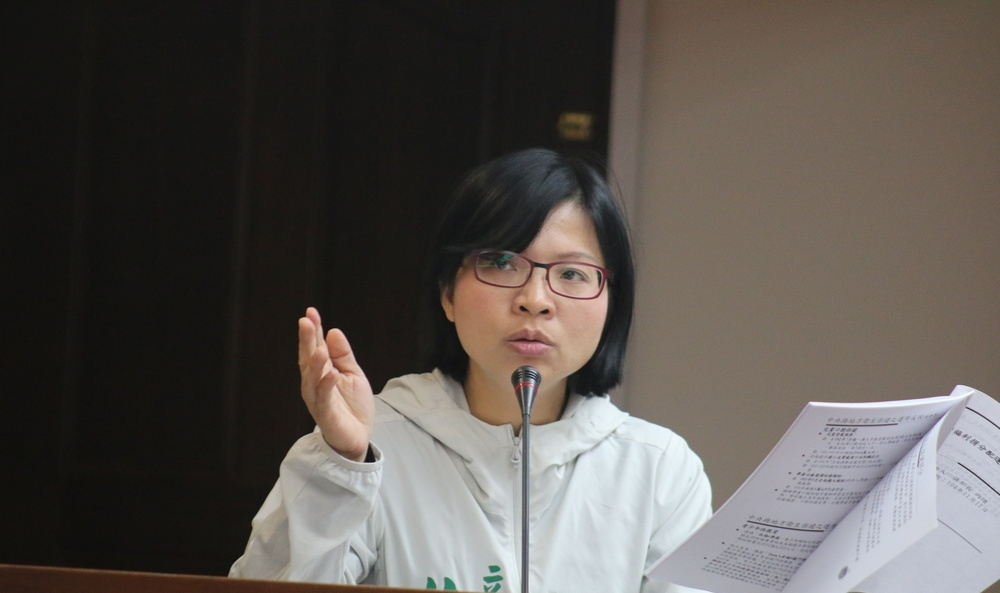
Lin Shu-fen (DPP, Taipei County 2)

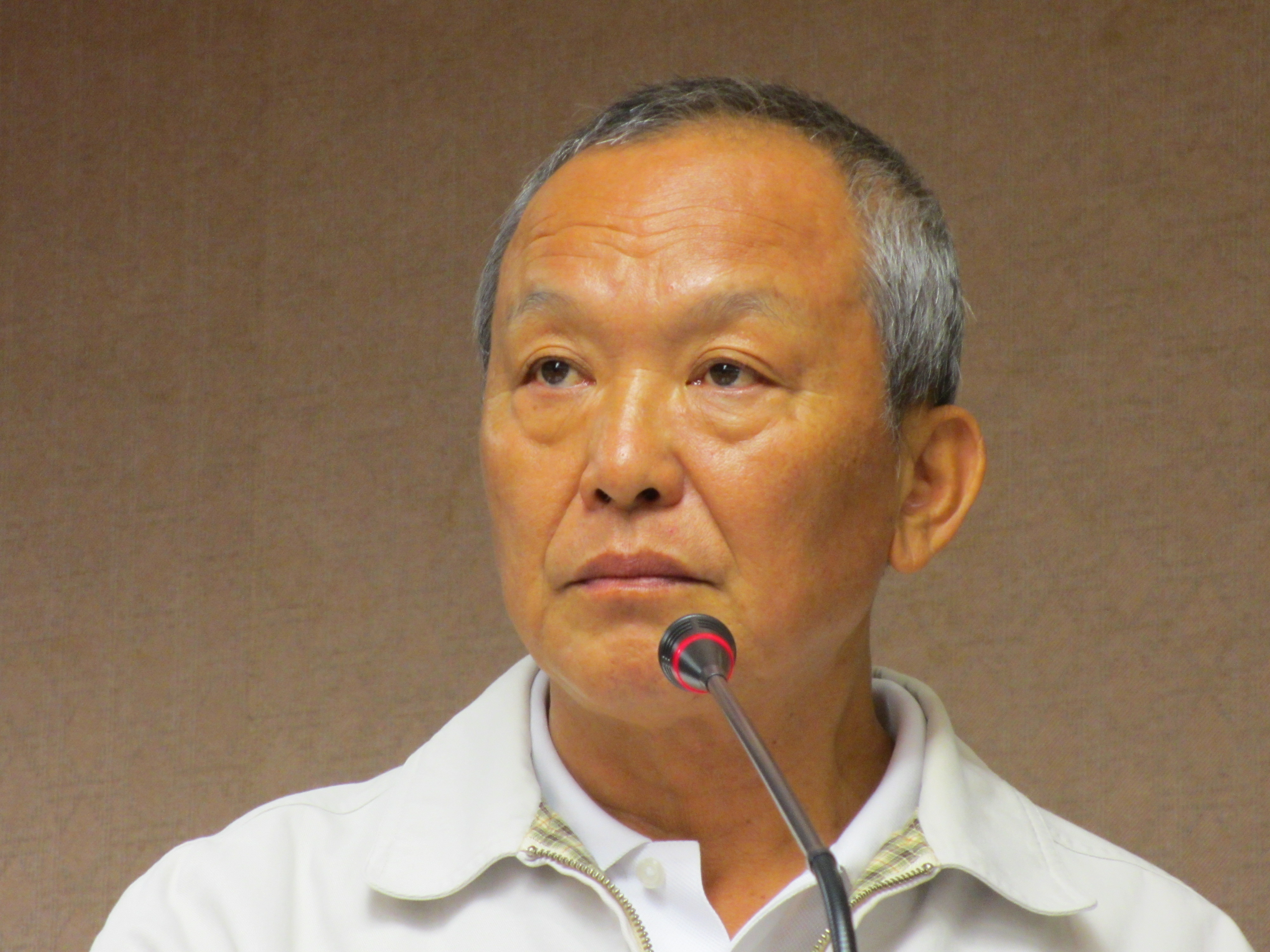
Hsu Yao-chang (KMT, Miaoli 2)

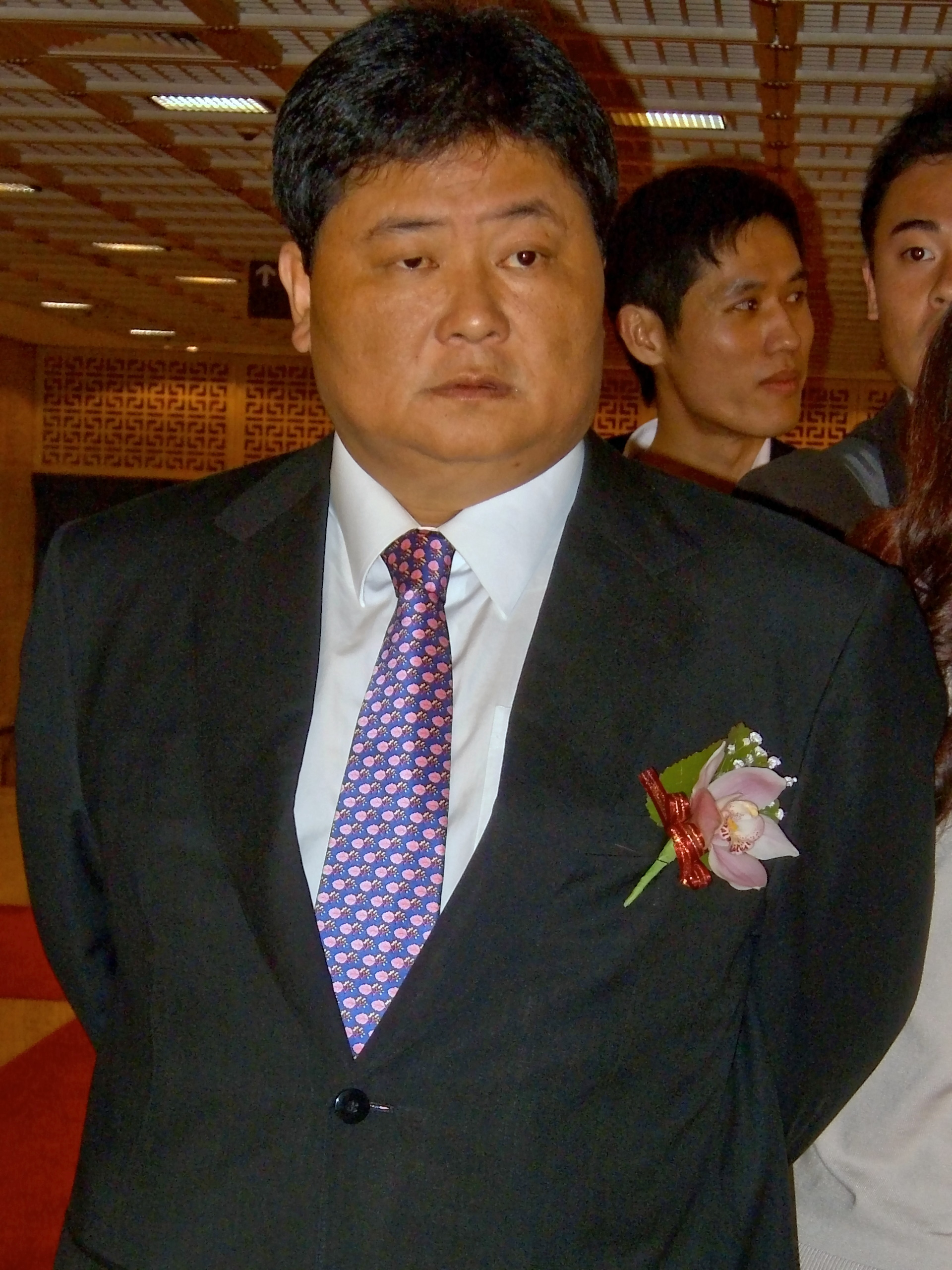
Yen Chin-piao (NPSU, Taichung County 2)

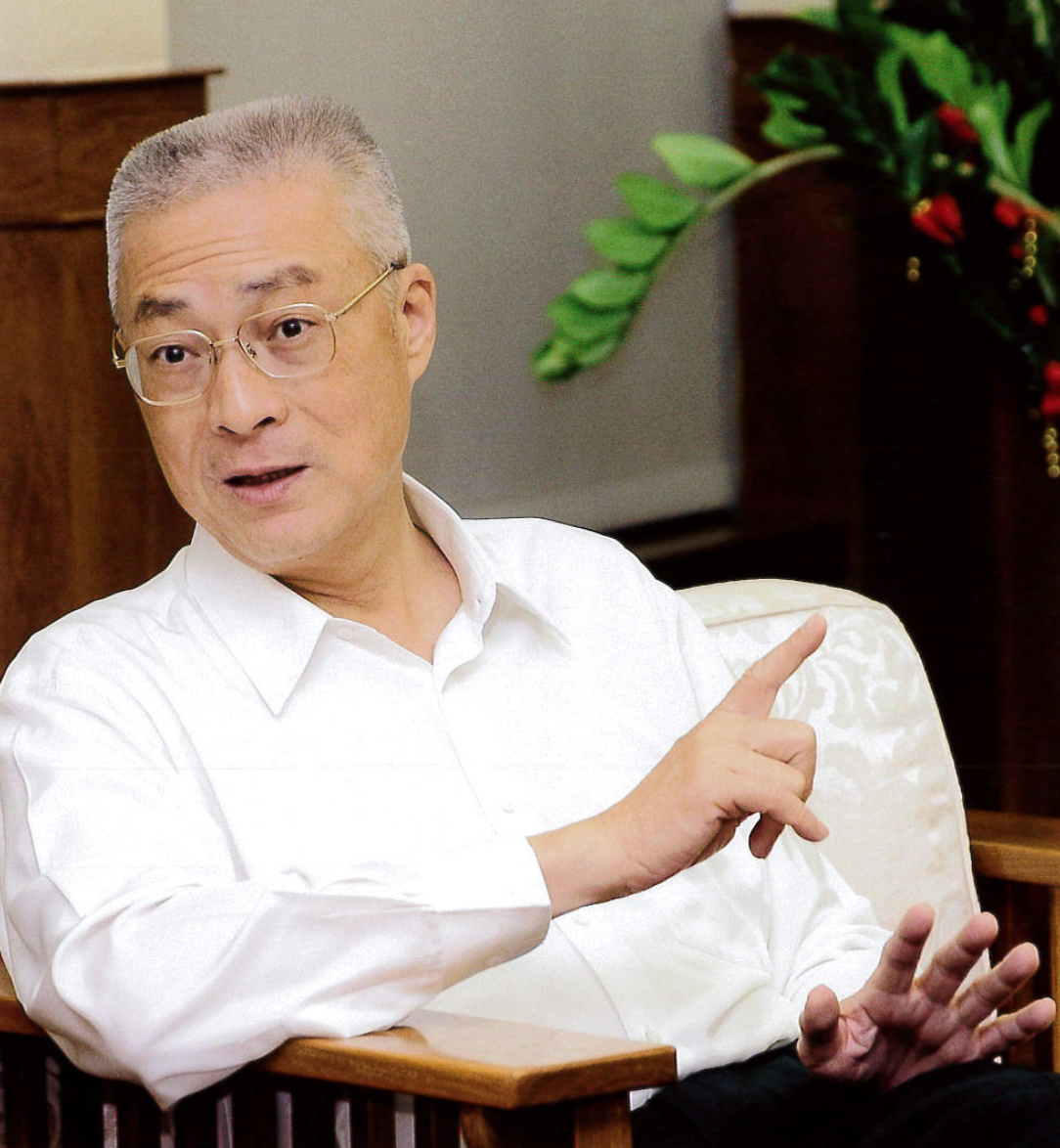
Wu Den-yih (KMT, Nantou 1)

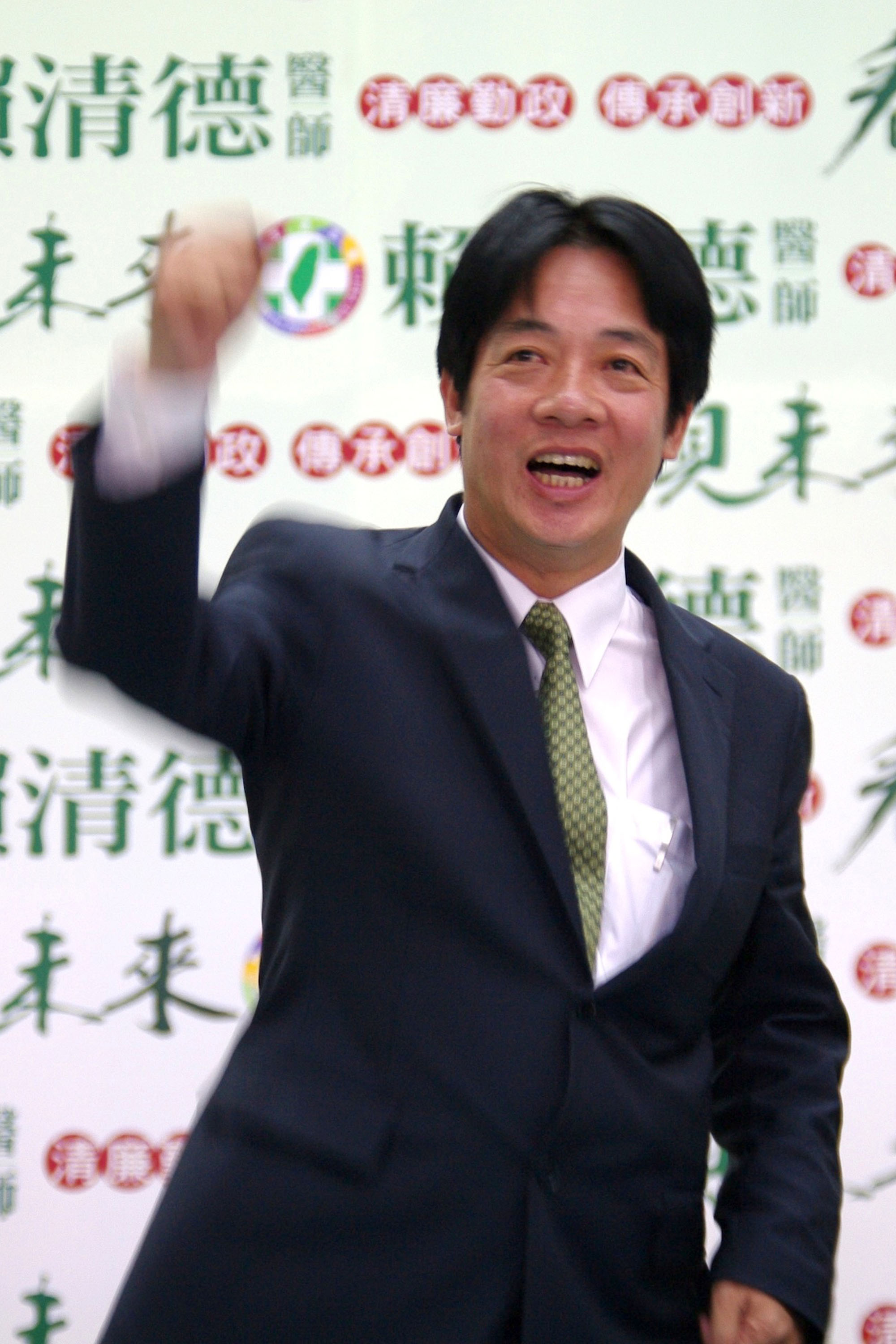
William Lai (DPP, Tainan City 2)

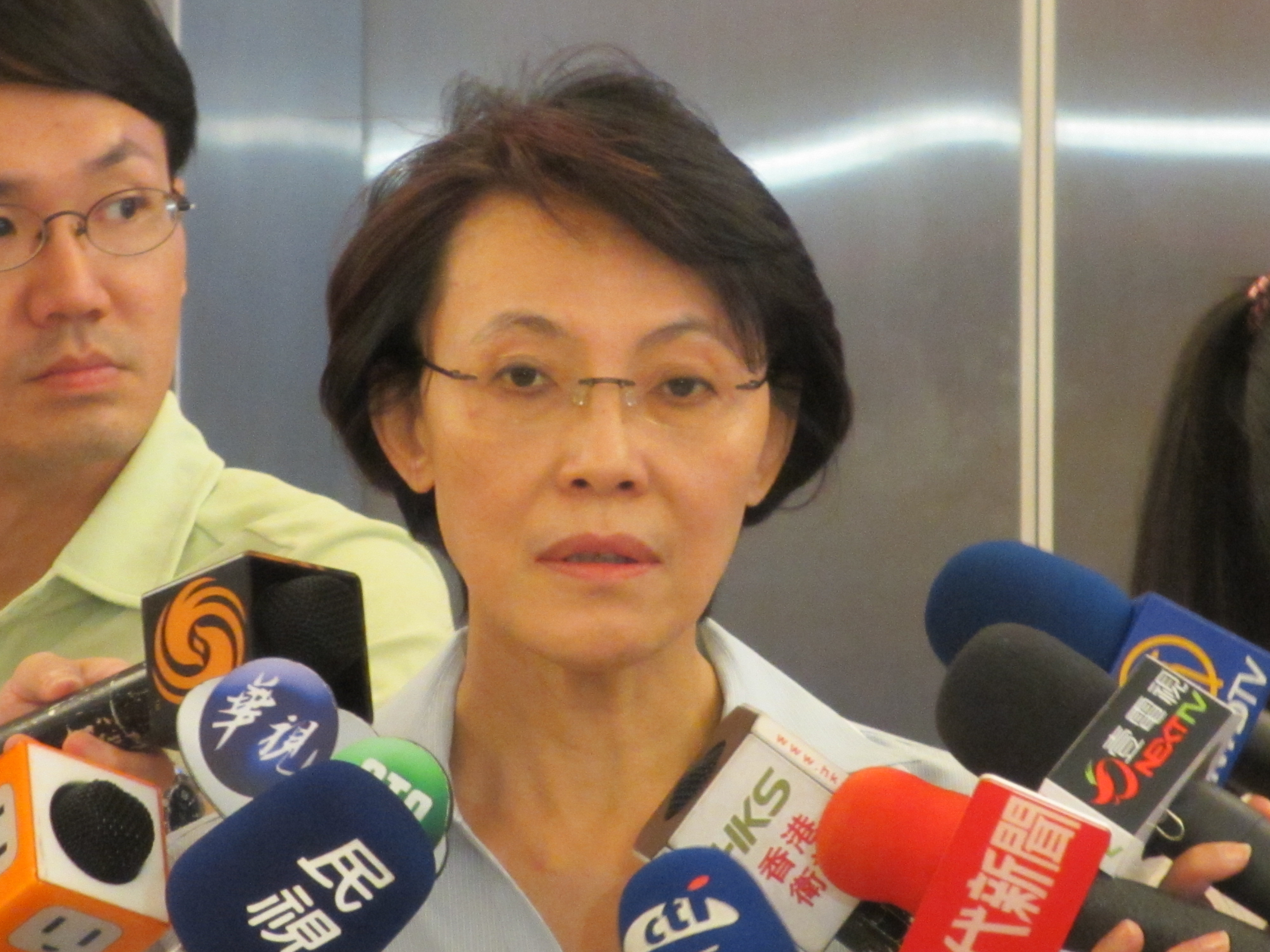
Huang Chao-shun (KMT, Kaohsiung City 1)

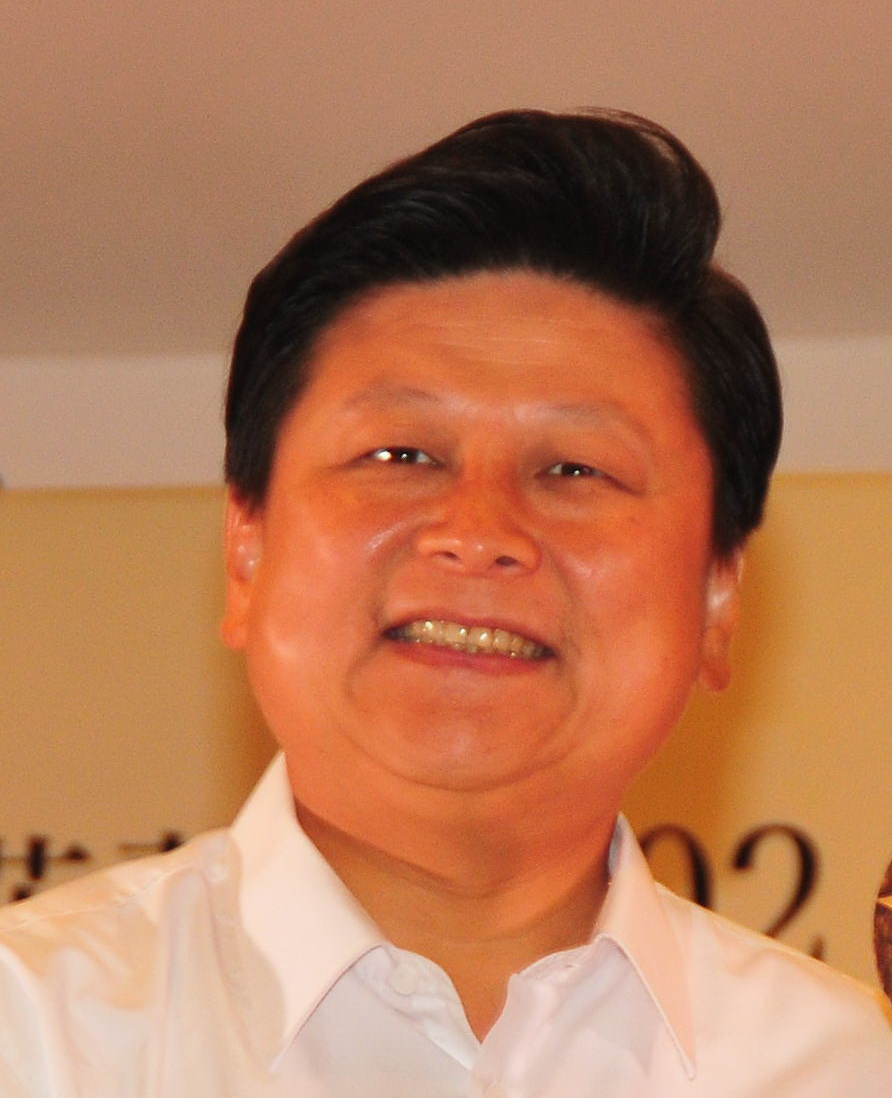
Fu Kun-chi (KMT, Hualien)

Liao Kuo-tung (Sufin Siluko) (KMT, Lowland aborigines)

Chai Trong-rong (DPP, Party list)

== List of constituency members ==
Members of the 7th Legislative Yuan were as follows:

Constituency		Current member	Party
Changhua County	1st	Chen Hsiu-ching (陳秀卿)	Kuomintang
Changhua County	2nd	Lin Tsang-min (林滄敏)	Kuomintang
Changhua County	3rd	Cheng Ru-fen (鄭汝芬)	Kuomintang
Changhua County	4th	Hsiao Ching-tien (蕭景田)	Kuomintang
Chiayi City		Chiang Yi-hsiung (江義雄)	Kuomintang
Chiayi County	1st	Wong Chung-chun (翁重鈞)	Kuomintang
Chiayi County	2nd	Helen Chang (張花冠)	Democratic Progressive
Hsinchu City		Lu Hsueh-chang (呂學樟)	Kuomintang
Hsinchu County		Chiu Ching-chun (邱鏡淳)	Kuomintang
Hualien County		Fu Kun-chi (傅崐萁)	Kuomintang/People First
Kaohsiung City	1st	Huang Chao-shun (黃昭順)	Kuomintang
Kaohsiung City	2nd	Kuan Bi-ling (管碧玲)	Democratic Progressive
Kaohsiung City	3rd	Hou Tsai-feng (侯彩鳳)	Kuomintang
Kaohsiung City	4th	Lee Fu-hsing (李復興)	Kuomintang
Kaohsiung City	5th	Kuo Wen-cheng (郭玟成)	Democratic Progressive
Kaohsiung County	1st	Chung Shao-ho (鍾紹和)	Kuomintang/People First
Kaohsiung County	2nd	Lin Yi-shih (林益世)	Kuomintang
Kaohsiung County	3rd	Chen Chi-yu (陳啟昱)	Democratic Progressive
Kaohsiung County	4th	Chiang Ling-chun (江玲君)	Kuomintang
Keelung City		Hsieh Kuo-liang (謝國樑)	Kuomintang
Kinmen County		Chen Fu-hai (陳福海)	Kuomintang/Independent
Lienchiang County		Tsao Erh-chung (曹爾忠)	Kuomintang
Miaoli County	1st	Lee Yi-ting (李乙廷)	Kuomintang
Miaoli County	2nd	Hsu Yao-chang (徐耀昌)	Kuomintang
Nantou County	1st	Wu Den-yih (吳敦義)	Kuomintang
Nantou County	2nd	Lin Ming-chen (林明溱)	Kuomintang
Penghu County		Lin Pin-kuan (林炳坤)	Kuomintang/Non-Partisan Solidarity Union
Pingtung County	1st	Su Chen-ching (蘇震清)	Democratic Progressive
Pingtung County	2nd	Wang Chin-shueh (王進士)	Kuomintang
Pingtung County	3rd	Pan Men-an (潘孟安)	Democratic Progressive
Taichung City	1st	Tsai Chin-lung (蔡錦隆)	Kuomintang
Taichung City	2nd	Lu Shiow-yen (盧秀燕)	Kuomintang
Taichung City	3rd	Daniel Huang (黃義交)	Kuomintang/People First
Taichung County	1st	Liu Chuan-chung (劉銓忠)	Kuomintang
Taichung County	2nd	Yen Ching-piao (顏清標)	Kuomintang/Non-Partisan Solidarity Union
Taichung County	3rd	Chiang Lien-fu (江連福)	Kuomintang
Taichung County	4th	Shyu Jong-shyong (徐中雄)	Kuomintang
Taichung County	5th	Yang Chiung-ying (楊瓊瓔)	Kuomintang
Tainan City	1st	Chen Ting-fei (陳亭妃)	Democratic Progressive
Tainan City	2nd	William Lai (賴清德)	Democratic Progressive
Tainan County	1st	Yeh Yi-jin (葉宜津)	Democratic Progressive
Tainan County	2nd	Huang Wei-cher (黃偉哲)	Democratic Progressive
Tainan County	3rd	Lee Chun-yee (李俊毅)	Democratic Progressive
Taipei City	1st	Ting Shou-chung (丁守中)	Kuomintang
Taipei City	2nd	Justin Chou (周守訓)	Kuomintang
Taipei City	3rd	John Chiang (蔣孝嚴)	Kuomintang
Taipei City	4th	Alex Tsai (蔡正元)	Kuomintang
Taipei City	5th	Lin Yu-fang (林郁方)	Kuomintang
Taipei City	6th	Diane Lee (李慶安)	Kuomintang
Taipei City	7th	Alex Fai (費鴻泰)	Kuomintang
Taipei City	8th	Lai Shyh-bao (賴士葆)	Kuomintang
Taipei County	1st	Wu Yu-sheng (吳育昇)	Kuomintang
Taipei County	2nd	Lin Shu-fen (林淑芬)	Democratic Progressive
Taipei County	3rd	Yu Tian (余天)	Democratic Progressive
Taipei County	4th	Lee Hung-chun (李鴻鈞)	Kuomintang/People First
Taipei County	5th	Huang Chih-hsiung (黃志雄)	Kuomintang
Taipei County	6th	Lin Hung-chih (林鴻池)	Kuomintang
Taipei County	7th	Wu Chin-chih (吳清池)	Kuomintang
Taipei County	8th	Chang Ching-chung (張慶忠)	Kuomintang
Taipei County	9th	Lin Te-fu (林德福)	Kuomintang
Taipei County	10th	Lu Chia-chen (盧嘉辰)	Kuomintang
Taipei County	11th	Lo Ming-tsai (羅明才)	Kuomintang
Taipei County	12th	Lee Ching-hua (李慶華)	Kuomintang
Taitung County		Justin Huang (黃健庭)	Kuomintang/People First
Taoyuan County	1st	Chen Ken-te (陳根德)	Kuomintang
Taoyuan County	2nd	Liao Cheng-ching (廖正井)	Kuomintang
Taoyuan County	3rd	John Wu (吳志揚)	Kuomintang
Taoyuan County	4th	Yang Li-huan (楊麗環)	Kuomintang
Taoyuan County	5th	Chu Fong-chih (朱鳳芝)	Kuomintang
Taoyuan County	6th	Sun Ta-chien (孫大千)	Kuomintang
Yilan County		Lin Chian-rong (林建榮)	Kuomintang
Yunlin County	1st	Chang Chia-chun (張嘉郡)	Kuomintang
Yunlin County	2nd	Chang Sho-wen (張碩文)	Kuomintang
Lowland Aborigine (3 seats)		Liao Kuo-tung (廖國棟, Sufin Siluko)	Kuomintang
Lowland Aborigine (3 seats)		Yang Jen-fu (楊仁福)	Kuomintang
Lowland Aborigine (3 seats)		Lin Cheng-er (林正二)	People First/Kuomintang
Highland Aborigine (3 seats)		Chien Tung-ming (簡東明, Uliw Qaljupayare)	Kuomintang
Highland Aborigine (3 seats)		Kung Wen-chi (孔文吉, Yosi Takun)	Kuomintang
Highland Aborigine (3 seats)		Kao Chin Su-mei (高金素梅, Ciwas Ali)	Non-Partisan Solidarity Union

== Former makeup ==
The following is the list of constituencies that were in place at the time of the 2004 legislative election.

Constituency	Seats	Minimum female members
First Taipei City constituency (Beitou, Shihlin, Songshan, Sinyi, Neihu, Nangang)	10	1
Second Taipei City constituency (Jhongshan, Datong, Da-an, Jhongjheng, Wanhua, Wunshan)	10	1
First Kaohsiung City constituency (Yancheng, Gushan, Cijin, Zuoying, Nanzih, Sanmin)	6	1 shared with Second Kaohsiung City Constituency
Second Kaohsiung City constituency (Sinsing, Cianjin, Lingya, Cianjhen, Siaogang)	5	
First Taipei County constituency (Banciao City, Tucheng City, Shulin City, Yingge Township, Sansia Township)	2 shared with Second and Third Taipei County constituencies	
Second Taipei County constituency (Sanchong City, Lujhou City, Sinjhuang City, Wugu Township, Taishan Township, Linkou Township, Danshuei Township, Bali Township, Sanjhih Township, Shihmen Township, Jinshan Township, Wanli Township)	-	
Third Taipei County constituency (Jhonghe City, Yonghe City, Sindian City, Shenkeng Township, Shihding Township, Pinglin Township, Wulai Township, Sijhih City, Rueifang Township, Pingsi Township, Shuangsi Township, Gongliao Township)	-	
Yilan County	3	-
Taoyuan County	13	1
Hsinchu County	3	-
Miaoli County	4	-
Taichung County	11	1
Changhua County	10	1
Nantou County	4	-
Yunlin County	6	1
Chiayi County	4	-
Tainan County	8	1
Kaohsiung County	9	1
Pingtung County	6	1
Taitung County	1	-
Hualien County	2	-
Penghu County	1	-
Keelung City	3	-
Hsinchu City	3	-
Taichung City	8	1
Chiayi City	2	-
Tainan City	6	1
Kinmen County	1	-
Lienchiang County	1	-
Highland (Aboriginal constituency)	4	-
Lowland (Aboriginal constituency)	4	-
Nationwide constituency (proportional representation)	41	-
Overseas Chinese (proportional representation)	8	-
Total	225 (176 from multi-member, non-aboriginal and non-proportional representation constituencies)	-

== See also ==
- 2008 Taiwan legislative election
- List of candidates of Taiwan legislative election, 2008
- Eighth Legislative Yuan
- Ninth Legislative Yuan
