= Chen Ying =

Chen Ying may refer to:

- Chen Ying (badminton) (born 1971), Chinese badminton player
- Chen Ying (politician) (born 1972), Taiwanese politician
- Chen Ying (sport shooter) (born 1977), Chinese sport shooter
- Jeannie Chan (born 1989), or Chen Ying, Hong Kong–based actress
- Chen Ying (fictional), fictional character in the historical novel Romance of the Three Kingdoms

== See also ==
- Ying Chen (born 1961), Chinese Canadian author
