= Zheng Tiancai =

The name Zheng Tiancai may refer to:

- Zheng Tiancai (郑天才), a character in Singaporean drama series Your World in Mine
- Sra Kacaw (born 1956), Amis Taiwanese politician also known as Jeng Tian-tsair (鄭天財; pinyin: Zhèng Tiāncái) in Chinese
