= Chen Yi-min =

Taiwanese politician

Chen Yi-ming
- 陳宜民
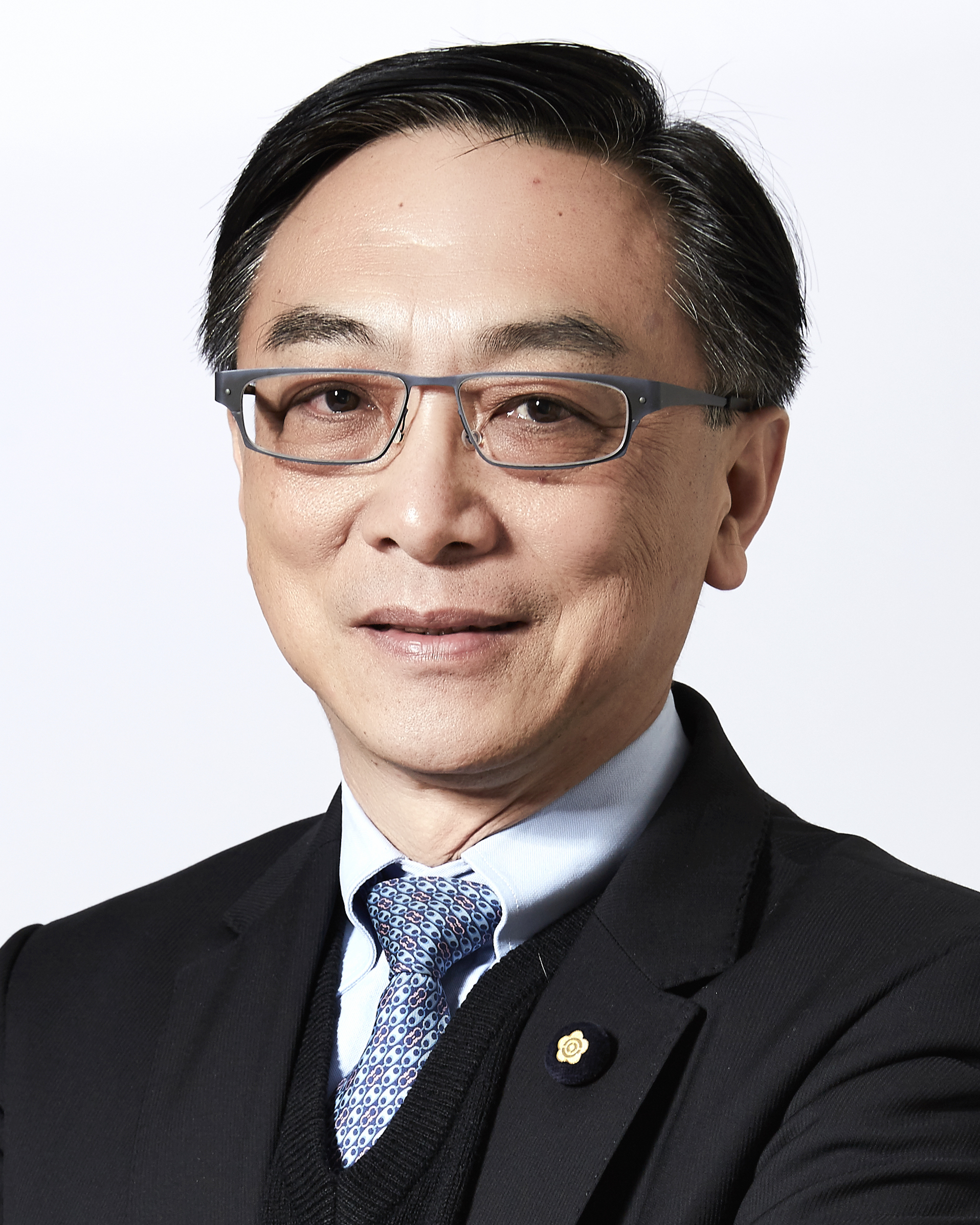
- Official portrait, 2016

Member of the Legislative Yuan
- In office 1 February 2016 – 31 January 2020
- Preceded by: Tseng Chu-wei
- Succeeded by: Lí Kuì-bín
- Constituency: Proportional Representation No.3

Personal details
- Party: Kuomintang
- Education: National Yang-Ming University (MD, MS); Harvard University (DSc)

Chen Yi-ming (Chinese: 陳宜民; pinyin: Chén Yímíng), also known as Arthur Chen, is a Taiwanese oncologist, physician, and politician. He was the vice president of Kaohsiung Medical University and a member of the Legislative Yuan from 2016 to 2020.

Before entering politics, Chen graduated from National Yang-Ming University and earned his doctorate from Harvard University. His medical research focuses on cancer, AIDS and epidemiology.

== Education ==
Chen attended medical school at National Yang-Ming University, where he graduated with a Doctor of Medicine (M.D.) in 1982 ranked first in his class and earned a Master of Science (M.S.) in microbiology and immunology in 1984. After completing his compulsory military service in Taiwan in 1986, Chen pursued doctoral studies in the United States at Harvard University, where he earned a Doctor of Science (D.Sc.) at the Harvard School of Public Health specializing in cancer research under the supervision of virologist Max Essex in 1990.

After receiving his doctorate, Chen was a postdoctoral researcher at the National Cancer Institute in Frederick, Maryland, where he studied molecular oncology.

== Career ==
He was the party-list legislator of the Kuomintang in the 9th Legislative Yuan from 2016 to 2020. During the 2019 protest on 2019, he pushed a female police officer and he apologized for that behavior.

In May 2018, he joined the Kuomintang's Kaohsiung mayoral primary campaign. Han Kuo-yu won that campaign and was subsequently nominated as the party's mayoral candidate.
