= Chen Ying (politician) =

Taiwanese politician

Asenay Daliyalrep
- 陳瑩
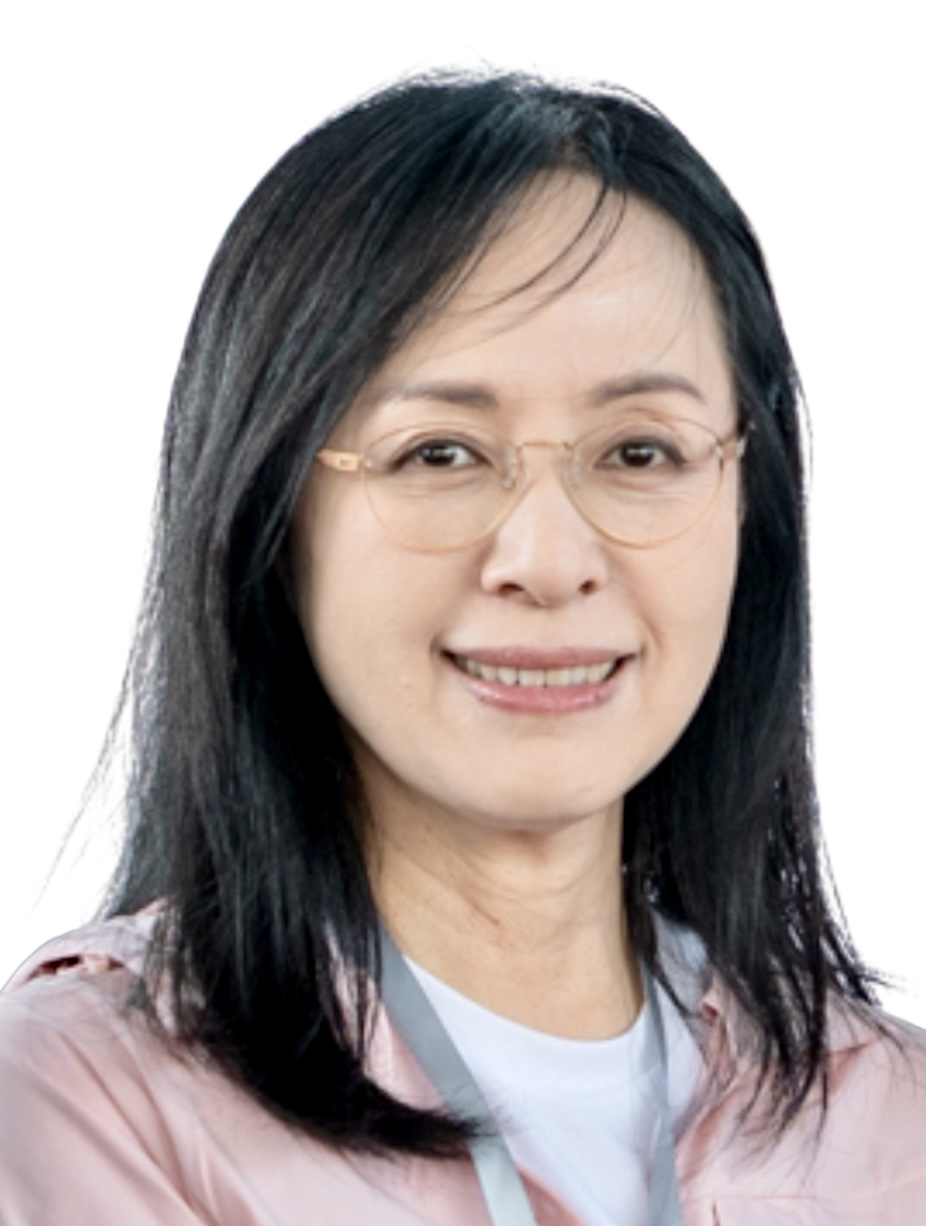
- Official portrait, 2026

Member of the Legislative Yuan
- Incumbent
- Assumed office 1 February 2016
- Constituency: Lowland Aborigine
- In office 1 February 2005 – 31 January 2012
- Constituency: Lowland Aborigine (2005-2008); Party-list (DPP) (2008-2012)

Personal details
- Born: 15 November 1972 (age 53) Taitung, Taiwan
- Party: Democratic Progressive Party
- Spouse: Chou Shyh-chuan (m. 2000; div. 2007)
- Parents: Adulumau Daliyalrep (father); Huang Yu-hsia (mother)
- Education: Wenzao Ursuline University of Languages (BA); Brigham Young University–Hawaii (did not graduate); San Francisco Conservatory of Music (BMus); University of Illinois Urbana-Champaign (MMus, DMus)

Chen Ying (Chinese: 陳瑩; pinyin: Chen Ying; Wade–Giles: Chen^{2} Ying^{2}; born 15 November 1972), also known as Asenay Daliyalrep in the Puyuma language, is a Taiwanese politician and musician who is currently serving as a member of the Legislative Yuan. A member of the Democratic Progressive Party, Chen served previous terms in the Legislative Yuan, from 2005 to 2012. Chen is a Puyuma Taiwanese and currently represents the Lowland Aborigine Constituency.

== Early life and education ==
Chen was born in Taitung and belongs to the Puyuma tribe. After graduating with a degree in languages from the Wenzao Ursuline University of Languages and studying at Brigham Young University, she earned a bachelor's degree in music (piano) from the San Francisco Conservatory of Music in 2000, a Master of Music (MMus) in harpsichord performance from the University of Illinois Urbana-Champaign in 2002, then a Doctor of Music (DMus) from the University of Illinois.

== Political career ==
=== Member of the Legislative Yuan (2005–2012, 2016–present) ===
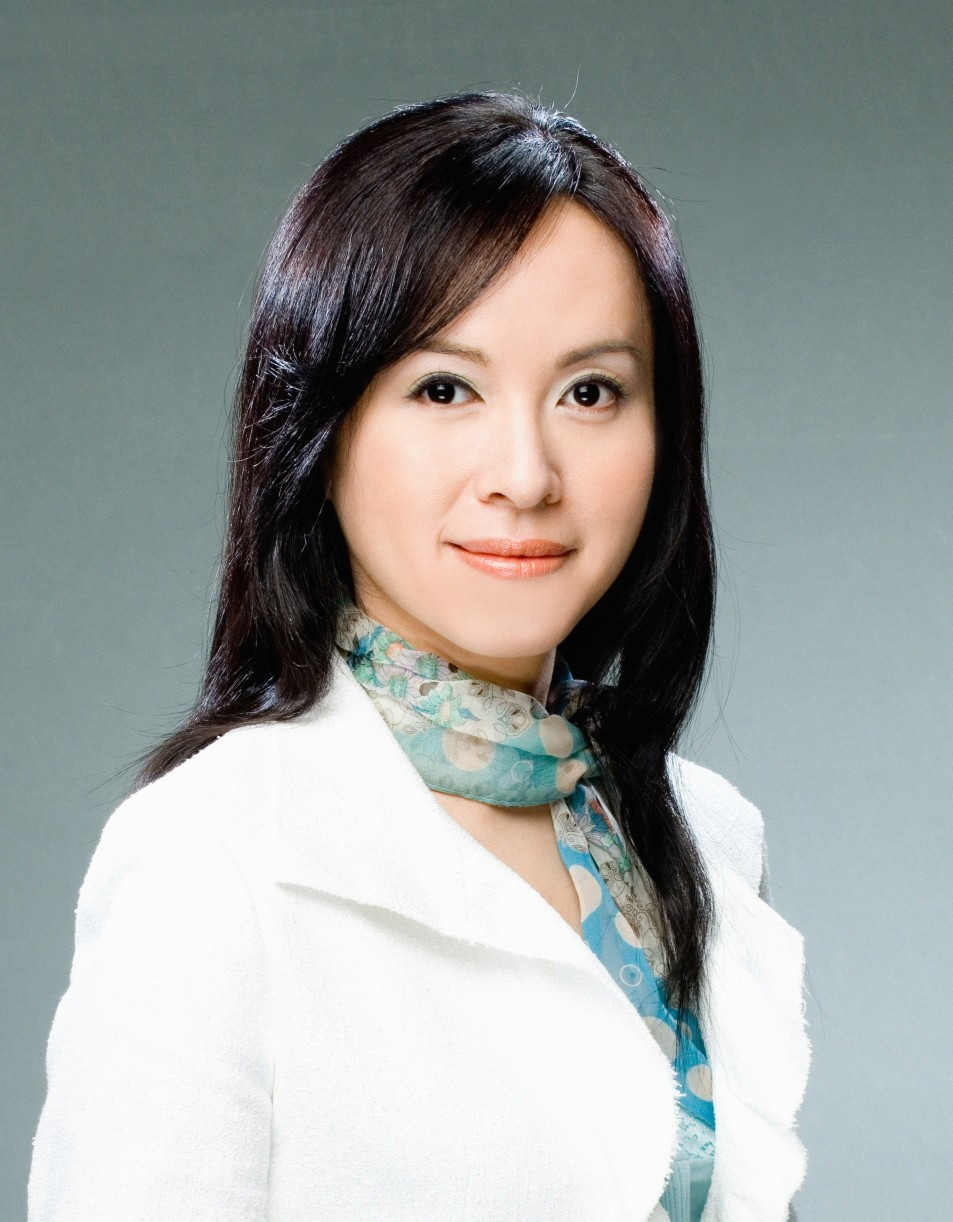
Chen's official portrait during her tenure as member of the 7th Legislative Yuan

In 2004, Chen ran in the legislative election and secured a seat for the DPP. She was the first and only member of the DPP to have won in the Lowland Aborigine Constituency.

In 2011, at an event where then-President Ma Ying-jeou and Premier Wu Den-yih signed their names on a Tao canoe to celebrate the 100th anniversary of the Republic of China's founding, Chen criticized Ma for showing contempt for aboriginal culture. She was quoted as saying, "100th anniversary of the ROC was also a demarcation of the 100 years during which Aborigines lost their land."

Chen again secured a Lowland seat in 2016.

In 2018, Chen negotiated a deal for a Pinaski palakuwan, an important institution in the Puyuma tribe, to be sold to an indigenous buyer. The palakuwan was previously registered to an "Aniu" (アニウ) during the Japanese era but was transferred to a Han Chinese ownership. As the property was rumored to be listed for sale in the previous year, Puyuma tribal members expressed concern that the palakuwan would be jeopardized. Chen requested the Executive Yuan to aid the tribe in repurchasing the property, and this request was granted in October 2018. The initiative was part of Chen's larger campaign to realize transitional justice in the prior treatment of the Taiwanese indigenous peoples in previous administrations.

In July 2019, Chen announced that the government had nationalized land that was registered to a defunct Japanese-era organization. The land was never properly registered in the modern era, and was neither public nor private. Chen worked with Kuomintang legislator Sra Kacaw to facilitate a bipartisan process of recognizing the land as public and reserving it for indigenous use.

Chen was re-elected in 2020 along with Wu Li-hua, and the 2020 election became the first time the DPP was able to secure seats in both the Lowland and Highland Aborigine constituencies. Chen called attention to the Chinese propaganda campaign targeted at the Taiwanese aboriginal population. She cited National Security Bureau findings that China had for decades carried out wide-ranging united front tactics such as "business incentives and procurement, funding and donations, cultural exchanges, promoting China as the “motherland" for Taiwanese youth, China-centric news and social media, and political lobbying." Chen demanded the bureau investigate cases of Chinese money being used to support Beijing's preferred candidates and influence elections in aboriginal districts.

In September 2021, along with other DPP colleagues as well as Taiwan Statebuilding Party legislator Chen Po-wei, Chen Ying called for the establishment of a permanent athletic training and sports science center similar to ones in the United States, Japan, and South Korea, to facilitate the training of competitive athletes in Taiwan.

=== Candidacy for Magistrate of Taitung ===
In early 2025, Chen announced her intention to seek for nomination from the Democratic Progressive Party for the candidacy ticket for Magistrate of Taitung in the 2026 Taiwanese local elections. Later the same year on 22 October, DPP's chair, also the President of Taiwan, Lai Ching-te announced her nomination to be the candidate.

== Personal life ==
Chen is a member of the Church of Jesus Christ of Latter-day Saints. Her father Adulumau Daliyalrep was former Magistrate of Taitung from 1993 to 2001 and was the Minister of the Council of Aboriginal Affairs from 2002 to 2005 during the administration of Chen Shui-bian.

Her grandfather, Kouichi Agematsu, was a member of the famed Kano baseball team, the Taiwanese high school team that won second place at Japanese High School Baseball Championship (Koshien) in 1931, portrayed in the 2014 film Kano. In honor of his father, Chen Chien-nian launched the Kung-Yuan Cup (耕元盃棒球賽), an annual baseball tournament that was restarted by Chen Ying in 2016.

== Awards and honors ==
In 2017, Māori King Tūheitia Paki awarded Chen a royal order for her work in promoting medical diplomacy as part of Taiwan's New Southbound Policy. Attendees of the ceremony included the Swiss and United States ambassadors to New Zealand.
