= Tsay Chung-han =

Tsay Chung-han MLY
- 蔡中涵; Safulo Kacaw Lalanges
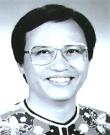

Member of the Legislative Yuan
- In office 1 February 2002 – 31 January 2005
- Constituency: Republic of China
- In office 1 February 1987 – 31 January 2002
- Preceded by: Yang Chuan-kwang
- Succeeded by: Liao Kuo-tung
- Constituency: Lowland Aborigine

Personal details
- Born: 1943 (age 82–83)
- Party: People First Party (since 2001)
- Other political affiliations: Kuomintang (until 1998); Democratic Non-Partisan Alliance (Independent) (1998–2001)
- Education: Soochow University (BA, MA); University of Tokyo (PhD)
- Profession: Sociologist

Tsay Chung-han (Chinese: 蔡中涵; Amis: Safulo Kacaw Lalanges or Safulo Arik Cikatopay; born 1943) is a Taiwanese sociologist and politician. He was a member of the Legislative Yuan from 1987 to 2005.

== Personal life ==
Tsay is of Amis descent. He earned a master's degree in international studies at Soochow University and a Ph.D. in sociology at the University of Tokyo, and was one of 21 people of indigenous descent interviewed for the book The Story of their Lives: the Academic Path of Taiwan's Aboriginal Doctorate Holders, which stated that, from 1945 to 2004, there were 23 indigenous people to have earned a doctorate. He has taught with the Social Science Center at National Chengchi University, served as an associate professor at Tamkang University, a visiting professor at Peking University, and a lecturer at Ryutsu Keizai University.

== Political career ==
Tsay was elected to the First Legislative Yuan in 1986 and 1990, as a representative of what became the Lowland Aborigine Constituency, under the Kuomintang banner. He remained affiliated with the Kuomintang during the second and third convocations of the Legislative Yuan. In 1987, martial law was lifted, and Tsay became an advocate for the sailors captured during the Tuapse incident. His efforts and press coverage by the Independence Evening Post led President Lee Teng-hui to release all remaining captives in 1988. Tsay won reelection as a political independent in 1998, working with the Democratic Non-Partisan Alliance. In 2001, Tsay returned to the Legislative Yuan via the party list of the People First Party.

As a legislator, Tsay took a lead role in the review of indigenous welfare policies, and commented on biomedical research involving indigenous people. In 2004, Tsay took part in protests that occurred after vice president Annette Lu stated that the Taiwanese indigenous peoples were not the original inhabitants of Taiwan, including a hunger strike.

In 2004, Liu Wen-hsiung, Jaw Shaw-kong and Tsay accused Chen Shui-bian of sexually harassing Mireya Moscoso. Separately, Chen and Moscoso sued the trio of accusers. The Taipei District Court issued a decision on Chen's lawsuit against Liu, Jaw, and Tsay in January 2006, ruling that Jaw was not guilty, but that Liu and Tsay had to publish public apologies in major Chinese-language newspapers.
