= Yang Jen-fu =

Taiwanese Amis politician (1942–2024)

Yang Jen-fu MLY
- 楊仁福
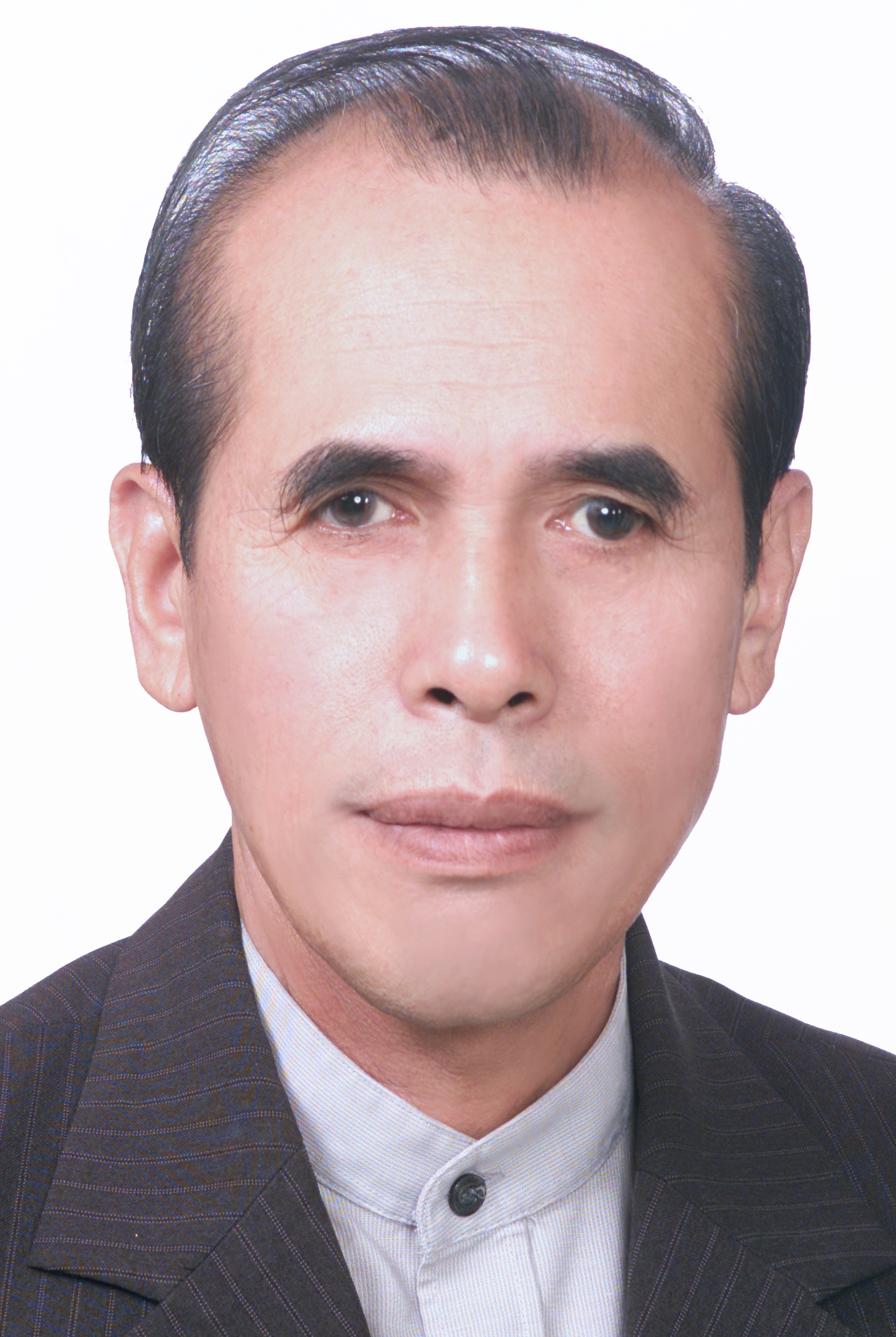

Member of the Legislative Yuan
- In office 1 February 1999 – 31 January 2012
- Preceded by: Chuang Chin-sheng
- Succeeded by: Sra Kacaw
- Constituency: Lowland Aborigine

Personal details
- Born: 16 February 1942
- Died: 4 September 2024 (aged 82)
- Party: Kuomintang
- Education: National Taiwan University (BA)
- Occupation: Politician

Yang Jen-fu (Chinese: 楊仁福; pinyin: Yáng Rénfú; 16 February 1942 – 4 September 2024) was a Taiwanese Amis politician.

== Early life ==
Yang graduated from National Taiwan University with a degree in political science, then became a teacher. He was of Amis descent and was active in a Hualien County-based association of Amis people.

== Political career ==
Yang served three terms on the Taiwan Provincial Consultative Council before his 1998 election to the Legislative Yuan. Shortly after the 1999 Chi-Chi earthquake, Yang formed an inter-party parliamentary group which sought to provide disaster relief to aboriginal communities. At the start of his second term, Yang expressed interest in joining the economics and energy committee. He was not offered membership, and as a result, scaled back his participation in Kuomintang caucus activities. In June 2002, Yang was formally admonished for voting against the caucus. Yang won a third term in 2005, and his forth term in 2008, despite a coalition of LGBT rights groups opposing his candidacy. He helped reestablish the aboriginal caucus within the Legislative Yuan in 2009. In March 2010, Yang was named convenor of the legislature's transportation committee alongside Chu Fong-chi.

== Political stances ==
Over the course of his legislative career, Yang has defended the political and property rights of aborigines. Upon the passage of the Aboriginal Basic Law in January 2005, Yang commented that it would "provide indigenous rights with a strong basis in law, to give Aboriginal people a stable and secure environment for survival." He has stated of the aboriginal workforce, "Everybody says they love Taiwan, but they don’t love my people. They say they can’t find workers, but that is just an excuse. The government has offered these companies many tax benefits. How can they simply ignore the rules and disregard the interests of local employees?" Yang also maintained an interest in transportation.

== Death ==
Yang died on 4 September 2024, at the age of 82.
