= Kolas Yotaka =

Taiwanese politician

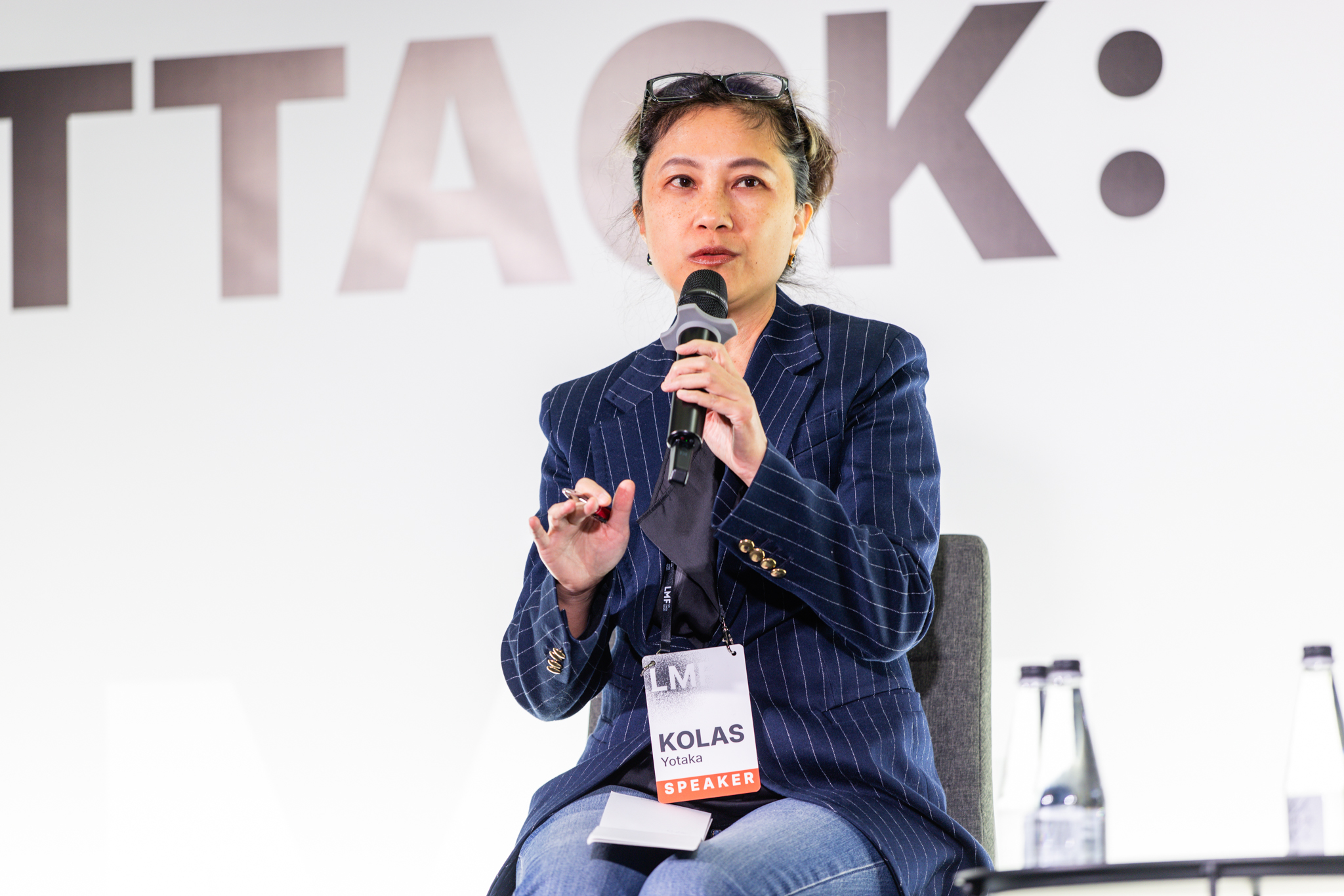
- Kolas in 2026

Spokesperson of the Office of the President
- In office 31 January 2023 – 28 June 2023 Serving with Lin Yu-chan, Gao Zun
- President: Tsai Ing-wen
- In office 20 May 2020 – 17 July 2022
- President: Tsai Ing-wen
- Preceded by: Ting Yun-kung
- Succeeded by: Gao Zun

Spokesperson of the Executive Yuan
- In office 16 July 2018 – 19 May 2020
- Prime Minister: William Lai; Su Tseng-chang
- Preceded by: Hsu Kuo-yung
- Succeeded by: Evian Ting

Member of the Legislative Yuan
- In office 1 February 2016 – 15 July 2018
- Succeeded by: Chiang Chieh-an
- Constituency: Party-list ( Democratic Progressive Party)

Personal details
- Born: Yeh Kuan-lin; 17 March 1974 (age 52) Hsinchu, Taiwan
- Party: Democratic Progressive Party
- Education: Tunghai University (BA, MA)
- Profession: Journalist

Kolas Yotaka (born 17 March 1974) is an Amis Taiwanese politician and journalist. From 2020 to 2022 and again in 2023, she served as spokesperson for the Office of the President under Tsai Ing-wen. Kolas previously served as spokesperson for the Executive Yuan in 2018, the first indigenous Taiwanese to hold the position.

As a journalist, Kolas has worked as a reporter for Formosa Television and as a news anchor for the Taiwan Indigenous Television. Kolas went on to become the director for the Indigenous Peoples Administration Bureau of the Taoyuan City Government. In 2016, she was elected as an at-large legislator and an aboriginal affairs representative of the Democratic Progressive Party (DPP). In 2017, she was elected as a visiting scholar of the US Department of State's International Leadership Program.

== Name ==
The Pangcah people (aka Amis people) use patronymics or matronymics. Kolas' grandfather received the Japanese name Yoshinari during Japanese rule, and her father followed the tribal system with the name Yoshinari Yutaka (吉成豐). After Japanese rule ended, the "Yo" sound was converted to the Chinese surname Yeh (葉) by the KMT government, which assigned the surname to the family as part of its Sinicization policies. Kolas followed the system by using her father's given name as her second name, and thus got the name Kolas Yotaka.

Initially, only her Han name Yeh Kuan-lin (Chinese: 葉冠伶) was legally recognized. She changed her legal name on her household registration to her indigenous name in 2006, after new legislation made it possible for indigenous people to do so. She uses the romanized Kolas Yotaka rather than the Han transcription (谷辣斯·尤達卡).

== Early life ==
She was born in Hsinchu City and belongs to the Amis Harawan tribe of Yuli, Hualien County.

== Journalism career ==
After completing her studies, she worked as a program producer and reporter on PTS and FTV. She also worked at weekly business magazine, Harvard Business Review and other magazines, as well as CNN Interactive English. She translated the book Routes: Travel and Translation in the Late Twentieth Century by anthropologist and historian James Clifford to Chinese.

From 2005 to 2013, she served as the assistant, producer and anchor at Taiwan Indigenous Television. She also served as the interview leader and the anchor for the English news. She was responsible for logistics, special planning, documentary filming and international news interviews. In 2007, while she was a producer and anchor of "Indigenous Peoples Evening News," the show received an Excellence in Journalism award. It was also nominated for the award in 2008 and 2011.

In 2014, she began producing and hosting the weekly international news program "Mata! See the World". She also produced 14 documentaries on indigenous activism. This series is called "Indigenous Movements". Several of her documentaries were nominated for and received a range of awards. "Wounds of Sami" was nominated for the 2012 Award for Excellence in Journalism, "The Death of Wufeng" won the silver at the 2013 Nepal International Aboriginal Film Festival, and "Fight for the Island-Punsu No Tao" was nominated for the 2014 International Uranium Film Festival in Rio.

== Political career ==
Kolas served as the director of the Aboriginal National Administrative Bureau of the Taoyuan City Government, the Ninth Legislative Yuan (representing the Democratic Progressive Party), and spokesperson for the Executive Yuan.

=== Aboriginal National Administrative Bureau of the Taoyuan City Government ===
At the end of 2014, Cheng Wen-tsan, then mayor of Taoyuan City, appointed her as the first female director of the Aboriginal Administration of the Taoyuan City Government; and revised the name of the institution which has been used for 14 years to “Indigenous Peoples Administration Bureau”. It took effect on March 11, 2015, and required the name card to include aboriginal scripts.

=== Legislative Yuan ===
In the 2016 general election, Kolas was elected as a legislator under the DPP. The Citizens Congress Watch rated her as an outstanding legislator in the Third Session. Sometimes she writes her legislative reports in Amis language.

On the eve of International Mother Language Day in 2016, Kolas promoted “mother language justice”, and proposed amendments to the “Names Regulations” and “Public Officials' Choice of Law”. It suggested that the name of the National Identity Card of the Republic of China can be used without Chinese characters, so other writing systems (such as tribal language orthography) can be used to register the name. It is possible to include both aboriginal languages and Chinese documents together on the election gazette. In mid-December of the same year, the draft Act on the Development of the Languages of Indigenous Peoples was proposed.

In May 2016, Kolas, Chen Chi-mai, and 17 other legislators proposed a bill to abolish the Mongolian and Tibetan Affairs Commission.

On 20 May 2016, 18 legislators including Kolas and Chen Qimai proposed the Draft Amendment to Article 16 of the Immigration and Immigration Law, which was passed on November 1, 2016.

On 5 September 2016, Kolas visited the Tibetan spiritual leader Dalai Lama in Dharamsala, India. She was the first Taiwanese indigenous legislator to meet with the Dalai Lama. The Dalai Lama was very interested in the Amis sash on Kolas. He said that President Tsai Ing-wen's apology to the aborigines was "very good, it is a trend". On the following day, the Human Rights Network for Tibet and Taiwan held their first press conference in Dharamsala.

On 15 February 2017, Kolas accompanied a Taiwanese-Tibetan family to the Executive Yuan to submit a request; on the 20th of the same month, the Ministry of the Interior's Immigration Department abolished the principle of "collective review of the application for residence of Tibetan spouses holding Indian travel permits" and established “following the Nationality and Immigration Act, Article 16, Item 4, Tibetan residents who have changed their nationality and hold Indian travel permit can apply for stay in Taiwan”.

On 23 April 2017, the Ministry of the Interior, at the request of Kolas, canceled the ceremony of the Mausoleum of the Yellow Emperor, and the Central Government would no longer send representatives of the Ministry to attend the Zheng Chenggong Festival, breaking a 54-year political convention and reflecting Taiwan's change in attitude to identity and multiculturalism.

On 17 June 2018, Kolas was invited by the Hawaiki Project (an Indigenous social initiative) to seek funding from the Council of Indigenous Peoples to allow New Zealand Māori children to come to Taiwan on 23 August 2018 for a 10-day origin trip and participate in traditional tribal ceremonies; and at the same time plan in mid-February 2019, allow Taiwanese indigenous children go to New Zealand to experience Māori culture.

=== Executive Yuan spokesperson ===
Because of her August 2014 drunk driving record, she has expressed her willingness to serve as an anti-drunk driving volunteer for life. KMT members of the Legislative Yuan argued with the social consensus of the "zero tolerance" policy for Kolas to be dismissed. Ho Hsin-chun, the head of the Democratic Progressive Party Committee, believes that a person who admits their mistake should be given the opportunity.

On 15 August 2018, when President Tsai Ing-wen passed through Los Angeles, she visited the local 85°C store. Therefore, 85 °C was bombarded by Chinese netizens as a “Taiwan independence enterprise”. 85 °C immediately issued a statement that they “Support the 1992 Consensus”. Kolas Yotaka said she "sympathize 85 °C very much" and also strongly condemns the use of self-righteous ideology in specific countries to suppress free markets and international companies.

On 22 August 2018, the Ngāti Manu tribe of the Maori in New Zealand visited Taiwan for a cultural trace. After arriving in Taiwan, the traditional leader (rangatira) Arapeta Hamilton led the team to the Executive Yuan to thank spokesperson Kolas Yotaka, expressing their excitement in finding a link between Maori culture and Taiwanese aboriginal culture.

On 20 September 2018, at the invitation of Bilung Gloria Salii of the Republic of Palau, she participated in the "25th Anniversary Conference of the National Women's Conference" as the guest speaker. She was the first representative of the Taiwanese government to ever attend the conference.

=== Presidential Office spokesperson ===
Kolas was the spokesperson from the President's Office from May 2020 to July 2022, when she resigned to unsuccessfully campaign for the governorship of Hualien during the 2022 Taiwanese local elections.

In 2023, she was appointed again as spokesperson, but resigned in July in response to allegations that she was involved in an affair with a married policeman assigned to her security detail during her governorship campaign.

== Personal life ==
In 2007, she was in a relationship with politician Icyang Parod.

In March 2018, lawyer Jewel Chen implied online that Kolas was cohabiting with politician Icyang Parod, so Kolas sued her for defamation. On October 3, 2018, the Taiwan Taipei District Prosecutors Office pointed out that since representation of the electorate is elected by the public, the handling of public affairs, whether private or honest, will affect the purity and credit of the public office, so it must be criticized by the outside world. Even if there is a need for private inspection, it should be publicly available. In this matter, since it was implied, the lawsuit was dropped. On 6 October 2018, Kolas requested assistance from the Legal Aid Foundation with lawsuit. This action was subsequently criticized as a misuse of Legal Aid resources.
