= Chiang Chieh-an =

Taiwanese politician

- 蔣絜安
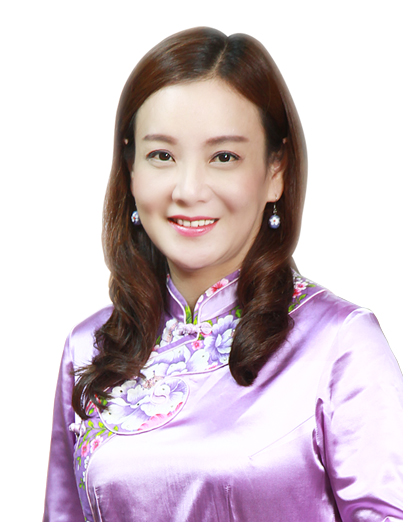

Member of the Legislative Yuan
- In office 17 July 2018 – 31 January 2020
- Preceded by: Kolas Yotaka
- Constituency: National At-Large

Personal details
- Born: 7 July 1968 (age 58) Miaoli County, Taiwan
- Party: Democratic Progressive Party
- Education: Soochow University (BA)

Chiang Chieh-an (Chinese: 蔣絜安; born 7 July 1968) is a Taiwanese politician who served in the Legislative Yuan from 2018 to 2020.

== Personal life ==
Chiang Chieh-an is of Hakka descent. Her father-in-law was the writer Chung Chao-cheng. She graduated from Soochow University with a bachelor's degree in Chinese language and literature.

== Political career ==
Chiang Chien-an was appointed to the Legislative Yuan via a proportional representation party list as a representative of the Democratic Progressive Party.

She took office on 17 July 2018, succeeding Kolas Yotaka, who joined the William Lai-led Executive Yuan as the spokesperson. In May 2019, an amendment to the Referendum Act proposed by Chiang was advanced to a second reading without undergoing committee review.

The amendment included a clause that required voters to present their National identification card when voting in a referendum. It also called for referendums to be held separately from elections and only once every two years. The opposition Kuomintang caucus raised concerns about the national identification card requirement, and it was removed before the amendment splitting referendums from elections passed.
