= Chuang Chin-sheng =

Taiwanese politician (born 1941)

Chuang Chin-sheng (Chinese: 莊金生; born 13 July 1941) is a Taiwanese politician.

Chuang studied law at National Chung Hsing University and was a high school teacher prior to his career in politics.

Chuang was mayor of Guangfu, Hualien before serving two terms (1981–1989) on the Taiwan Provincial Assembly. He won his first election to the Legislative Yuan in 1990, as a member of the Kuomintang from the Lowland Aborigine Constituency. Chuang was a member of the Legislative Yuan until 1999.
