= Sra Kacaw =

Amis Taiwanese politician

Sra Kacaw Jeng Tian-tsair MLY
- 鄭天財
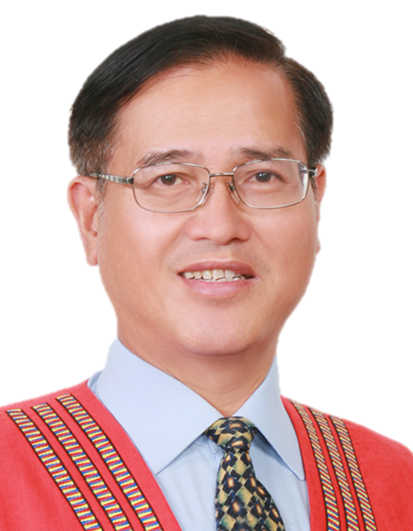
- Official portrait of Sra Kacaw

Member of the Legislative Yuan
- Incumbent
- Assumed office 1 February 2012
- Preceded by: Yang Jen-fu
- Constituency: Lowland Aborigine

Personal details
- Born: 16 December 1956 (age 69) Hualien County, Taiwan
- Party: Kuomintang
- Education: National Taiwan University (LLB)

Sra Kacaw (born 16 December 1956), also known by the name Jeng Tian-tsair (Chinese: 鄭天財; pinyin: Zhèng Tiāncái), is an Amis Taiwanese lawyer and politician.

== Early life and education ==
Sra Kacaw, an Amis, was born in Hualien County and studied law at National Taiwan University.

== Political career ==
Sra Kacaw has served as vice minister of the Council of Indigenous Peoples.

He was elected to the Legislative Yuan in January 2012 as a representative of the Lowland Aborigine district, and was reelected in 2016. Shortly after taking office for his first term, Sra Kacaw joined residents of Xiulin, Hualien to protest Taipower's construction of a well and nuclear waste storage site in the area. He coauthored an amendment to the Mountain Slope Conservation and Utilization Act in 2012 that led to criticism from many aboriginal rights groups. The act contained a clause that mandated how long an aborigine was to keep their land before legally selling it. Kao Chin Su-mei, Kung Wen-chi, and Sra Kacaw, along with Chien Tung-ming, Liao Kuo-tung, and Lin Cheng-er, all aborigines, believed that the five-year ownership period mandated in the law was discriminatory and irrelevant, as the law already stated that all aboriginal land could only be sold to another aborigine. Later that year, Sra Kacaw criticized the Executive Yuan's proposal to help Taiwanese businesses hire foreign workers, stating that the policy would lessen job opportunities for aborigines. He supported an amendment to the Criminal Procedural Act that passed in January 2013, mandating that aborigines always appear with their lawyers when being questioned by prosecutors and in all court appearances. was one of many Kuomintang legislators fined in February 2013, because he had abstained from many votes after members of the legislative body approved a pay cut for themselves. He has worked to pass legislation making more social housing available to aborigines.

In late August 2024, Sra Kacaw's legislative office and residence were searched as part of an investigation into corruption. He was released on bail after questioning. In December 2025, the Taipei District Prosecutors' Office indicted Sra Kacaw on charges of corruption, alleging that he had received NT$7.11 million in bribes between 2020 and 2023.
