= Lowland Aborigine Constituency =

Constituency of the Legislative Yuan of Taiwan

Lowland Aborigine district
- Multi-member constituency for the Legislative Yuan
- Electorate: Taiwanese Plains Aborigines

Current constituency
- Created: 2008
- Members: Huang Jen (2024–); Sra Kacaw (2012–); Chen Ying (2016–)

The Lowland Aborigine Constituency (Chinese: 平地原住民選舉區; pinyin: Píngdì Yuán Zhùmín Xuǎnjǔ Qū) is a multi-member constituency of the Legislative Yuan. Taiwanese indigenous people have elected representatives to reserved legislative seats since the 1970s. The predecessors to both the Lowland and Highland Aborigine districts were established in 1994. Since 2008, the Lowland Taiwanese indigenous voters have elected three members to the Legislative Yuan. At its peak between 1998 and 2004, the constituency sent four members to the Legislative Yuan.

The district is dominated by the Amis ethnic group, with only one legislator (Chen Ying) ever elected from the Puyuma ethnic group.

== Legislators ==
Election	Representative	Representative	Representative	Representative
1980	Lin Tung-hung (Amis); Kuomintang			
1983	Yang Chuan-kwang (Amis); Maysang Kalimud; Kuomintang			
1986	Tsai Chung-han (Amis); Safulo Kacaw Lalanges; Kuomintang			
1989	Tsai Chung-han (Amis); Safulo Kacaw Lalanges; Kuomintang	Chuang Chin-sheng (Amis); Kuomintang		
1992	Tsai Chung-han (Amis); Safulo Kacaw Lalanges; Kuomintang	Chuang Chin-sheng (Amis); Kuomintang	Kao Wei-he (Amis); Takapu; Kuomintang	
1995	Tsai Chung-han (Amis); Safulo Kacaw Lalanges; Kuomintang	Chuang Chin-sheng (Amis); Kuomintang	Chang Jen-hsiang (Amis); Kuomintang	
1998	Tsai Chung-han (Amis); Safulo Kacaw Lalanges; Independent	Yang Jen-fu (Amis); Kuomintang	Chang Jen-hsiang (Amis); Kuomintang	Lin Cheng-er (Amis); Kuomintang
2001	Liao Kuo-tung (Amis); Sufin Siluko; Kuomintang	Yang Jen-fu (Amis); Kuomintang	Chang Jen-hsiang (Amis); Kuomintang	Lin Cheng-er (Amis); People First Party
2004	Liao Kuo-tung (Amis); Sufin Siluko; Kuomintang	Yang Jen-fu (Amis); Kuomintang	Chen Ying (Puyuma); Asenay Daliyalrep; Democratic Progressive Party	Lin Cheng-er (Amis); People First Party
2008	Liao Kuo-tung (Amis); Sufin Siluko; Kuomintang	Yang Jen-fu (Amis); Kuomintang	Lin Cheng-er (Amis); People First Party	
2012	Liao Kuo-tung (Amis); Sufin Siluko; Kuomintang	Jen Tian-tsair (Amis); Sra Kacaw; Kuomintang	Lin Cheng-er (Amis); People First Party	
2016	Liao Kuo-tung (Amis); Sufin Siluko; Kuomintang	Jen Tian-tsair (Amis); Sra Kacaw; Kuomintang	Chen Ying (Puyuma); Asenay Daliyalrep; Democratic Progressive Party	
2020	Liao Kuo-tung (Amis); Sufin Siluko; Kuomintang	Jen Tian-tsair (Amis); Sra Kacaw; Kuomintang	Chen Ying (Puyuma); Asenay Daliyalrep; Democratic Progressive Party	
2024	Huang Jen (Amis); Kin Cyang; Kuomintang	Jen Tian-tsair (Amis); Sra Kacaw; Kuomintang	Chen Ying (Puyuma); Asenay Daliyalrep; Democratic Progressive Party	

== Election results ==
=== 2024 ===
Legislative Election 2024: Lowland Aborigine Constituency
Party	Candidate	Votes	%	±%
Kuomintang	Sra Kacaw	45,242	38.00	
Democratic Progressive	Chen Ying	27,431	23.04	
Kuomintang	Huang Jen	20,087	16.87	
Independent	Zhen Zheng Zong	9,823	8.25	
Independent	Gao Meizhu	6,928	5.82	
Independent	Chung Jen‧Da Lu Sih	5,148	4.32	
Independent	Wu Jian Zhi Ka Fei Ge	2,486	2.09	
Taiwan Renewal Party	KoLon	1,055	0.89	
New	Mikagkag Lifuk	863	0.72	
Total valid votes		119,063		
Kuomintang hold		Swing		
Democratic Progressive hold		Swing		
Kuomintang hold		Swing		
