= Lai Shyh-bao =

Taiwanese politician

Lai Shyh-bao MLY
- 賴士葆
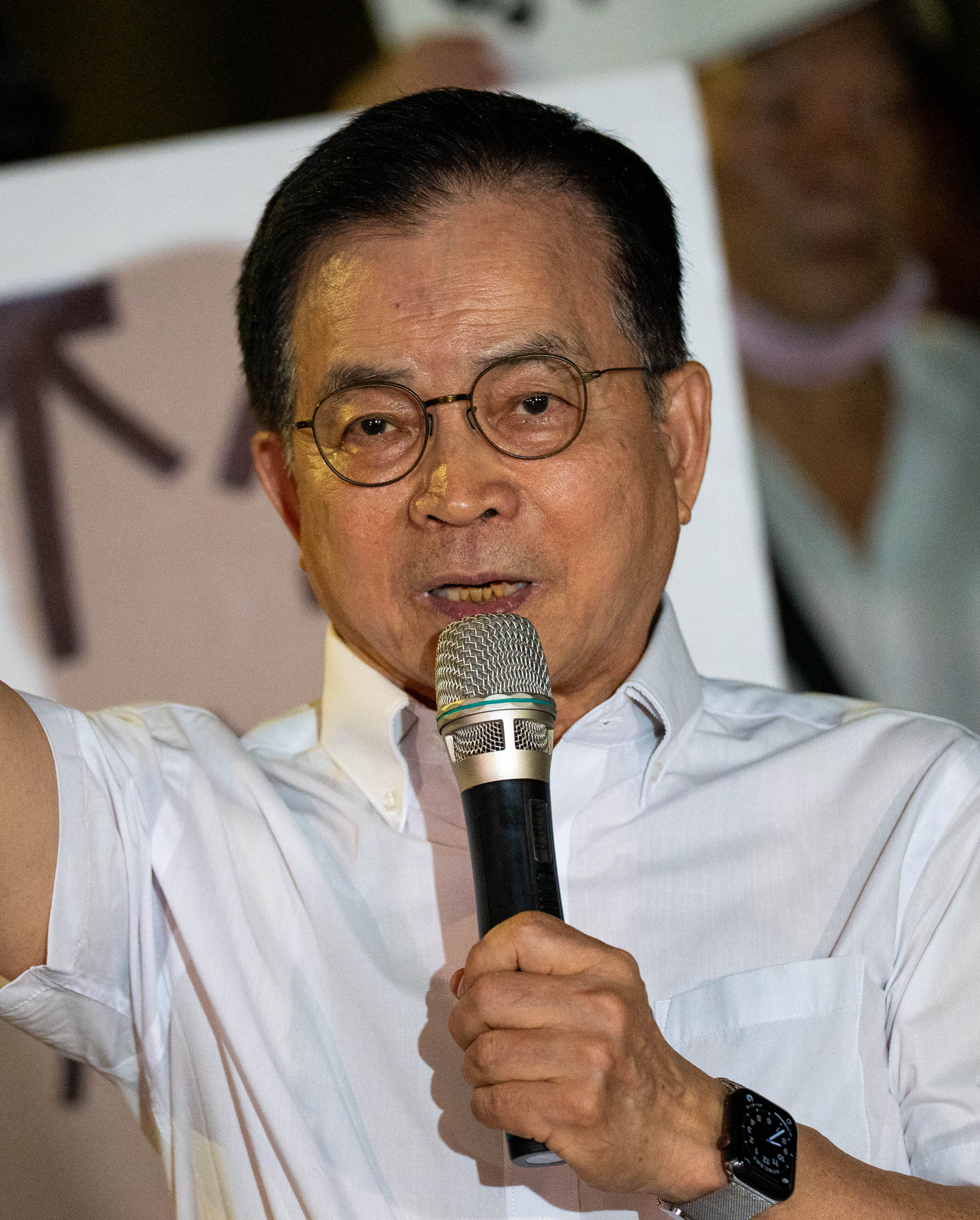
- Lai in 2025

Member of the Legislative Yuan
- Incumbent
- Assumed office 1 February 2008
- Constituency: Taipei 8

Minority Leader of the Legislative Yuan
- In office 1 February 2016 – 7 July 2016
- Preceded by: Ker Chien-ming
- Succeeded by: Liao Kuo-tung
- In office 1 February 1999 – 1 February 2002

Majority Leader of the Legislative Yuan
- In office 7 February 2015 – 1 February 2016
- Preceded by: Alex Fai
- Succeeded by: Ker Chien-ming

Personal details
- Born: 20 June 1951 (age 75) Taipei, Taiwan
- Party: Kuomintang
- Other political affiliations: New Party
- Education: National Cheng Kung University (BS); National Chengchi University (MBA); University of Southern California (MS, PhD)

Lai Shyh-bao (Chinese: 賴士葆; pinyin: Lài Shìbǎo; Wade–Giles: Lai⁴ Shih⁴-pao³; born 20 June 1951) is a Taiwanese engineer and politician currently serving as a member of the Legislative Yuan. A member of the Kuomintang (KMT), he has served on the party's Central Standing Committee and in the National Assembly.

== Early life and education ==
Lai was born on 20 June 1951 in Taichung, Taiwan. He was raised in a low-income household in the city, where his family lived in an illegally constructed dwelling. He graduated from Taichung Municipal Taichung First Senior High School, then known as Taiwan Provincial Taichung First Senior High School. His mother died from heart disease while he was a high school student.

After high school, Lai graduated from National Cheng Kung University with a bachelor's degree in mechanical engineering in 1973. He then earned a Master of Business Administration (M.B.A.) from National Chengchi University in 1976. Afterwards, he pursued further graduate studies in the United States, earning his Master of Science (M.S.) and his Ph.D. in industrial engineering and systems engineering in 1984 from the University of Southern California. His doctoral dissertation, completed under professors G. A. Fleischer and Ewald Heer, was titled, A Generalized Replacement Model for a Robotic System.

== Political career ==
From 1999 to 2002, Lai was a New Party legislator. Despite a declaration that he would leave the New Party at the end of 2001 but not join another party, Lai switched affiliations to the Kuomintang in his legislative second term and secured the continued endorsement of the New Party.

Lai was also promoted to increasingly important KMT caucus positions. In April 2005 he was deputy secretary of the caucus. By July, Lai had become caucus whip, a position he held until February 2016. Lai was nominated as the Kuomintang candidate for speaker of the ninth Legislative Yuan. The Democratic Progressive Party held a majority in the legislature, and elected Su Jia-chyuan as President of the Legislative Yuan. In 2020, Lai was again nominated for the speakership, losing for a second time, to Yu Shyi-kun.

== Electoral history ==
=== 2008 legislative election ===
- Eligible voters: 231,411
- Total votes cast (Ratio): 146,614 (63.36%)
- Valid Votes (Ratio): 145,173 (99.02%)
- Invalid Votes (Ratio): 1,441 (0.98%)

No.	Candidate	Party	Votes	Ratio	Elected
1	Mei Fong (梅峰)	Independent	171	0.12%	
2	Ren Li Min (任立民)	Home Party	234	0.16%	
3	Chou Po-ya (周柏雅)	Democratic Progressive Party	38,261	26.36%	
4	Lai Shyh-bao	Kuomintang (New Party Endorsement)	104,257	71.81%	
5	Shih Mei Yan (史美延)	Third Society Party	492	0.34%	
6	Fang Ying Jyun (方景鈞)	Independent	277	0.19%	
7	Peng Yan Wun (彭渰雯)	Green Party Taiwan	1,481	1.02%	

== Personal life ==
In July 2024, Lai hit and injured two pedestrians with his car. The incident came about a year after he had made a Facebook post criticizing a Ministry of Transportation policy to fine drivers who do not keep a distance of 3 meters from pedestrians in the crosswalk.
