= Liao Kuo-tung =

Taiwanese Amis politician and physician

Sufin Siluko Liao Kuo-tung MLY
- 廖國棟
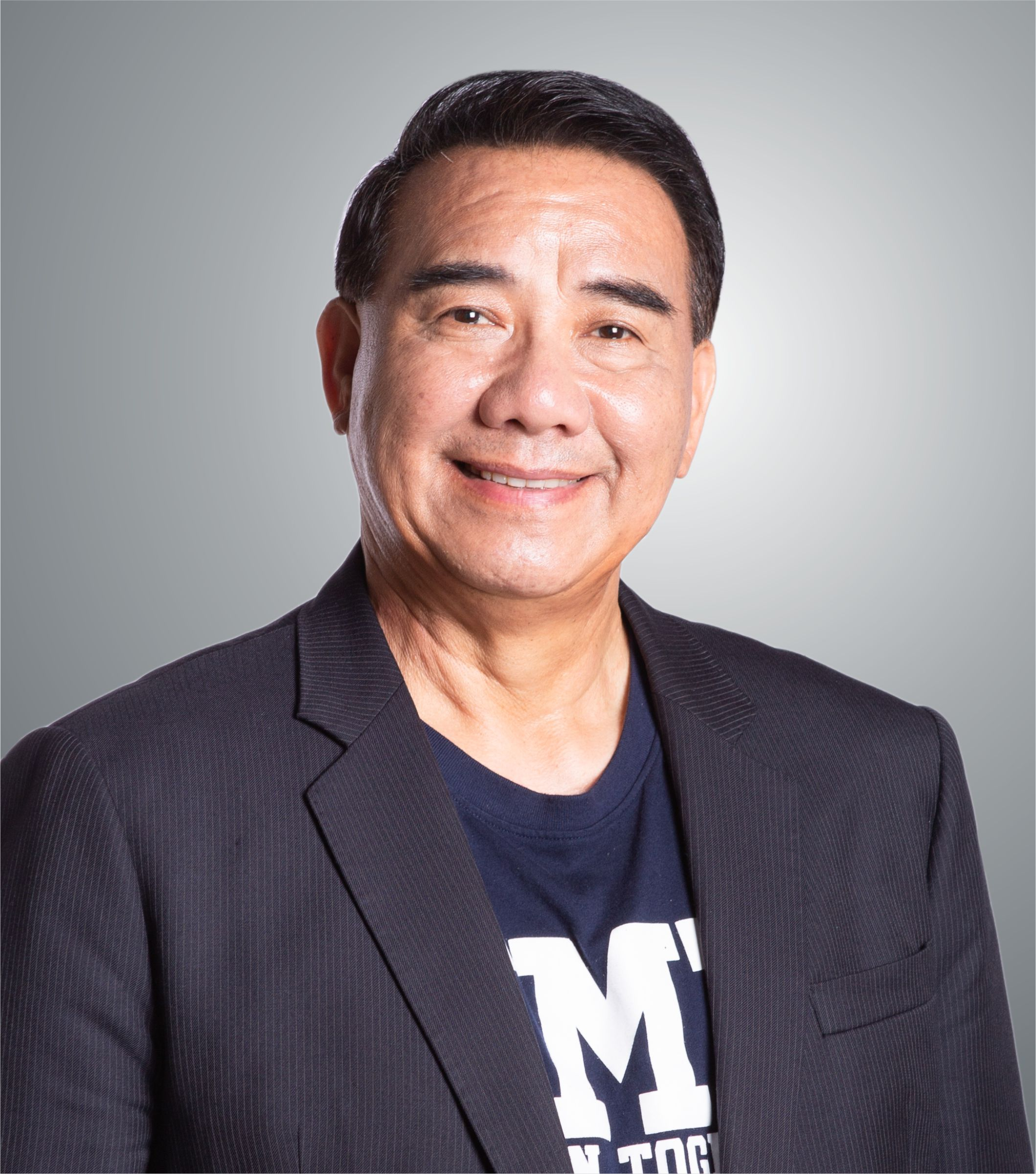
- Liao in 2019

Member of the Legislative Yuan
- In office 1 February 2002 – 31 January 2024
- Preceded by: Tsai Chung-han
- Succeeded by: Kin Cyang
- Constituency: Lowland Aborigine

Minority Leader of the Legislative Yuan
- In office 7 July 2016 – 29 June 2017
- Preceded by: Lai Shyh-bao
- Succeeded by: Lin Te-fu

Personal details
- Born: 8 January 1955 (age 71) Taitung County, Taiwan
- Party: Kuomintang
- Education: Kaohsiung Medical University (MD); University of the Pacific (MDiv)
- Profession: Physician

Liao Kuo-tung (Chinese: 廖國棟; pinyin: Liào Guódòng; born 8 January 1955) is a Taiwanese Amis politician and physician. Also known by the Amis name Sufin Siluko, he represented the Lowland Aborigine Constituency in the Legislative Yuan from 2002 to 2024.

== Early life and education ==
Liao Kuo-tung, of Amis descent, is also known by the name Sufin Siluko. Born in Taitung County, he studied medicine at Kaohsiung Medical University, where he graduated with a Doctor of Medicine (M.D.) degree in 1982. He later earned a Master of Divinity (M.Div.) from the University of the Pacific in the United States.

== Political career ==
Upon the end of his term in the third National Assembly, Liao was elected to the Legislative Yuan. In 2011, he served as a member of the Kuomintang Central Standing Committee. Three years later, Liao was named deputy caucus whip. He faced Apollo Chen in a May 2016 election for KMT caucus leader, the first time the post was directly elected. Liao eventually assumed the position on 7 July.

=== 2018 Taitung County magistrate election ===
2018 Kuomintang Taitung County magistrate primary results
Candidates	Place	Results
Rao Ching-ling	Nominated	Results not released
Liao Kuo-tung	2nd	Results not released

Liu's Kuomintang membership was suspended in August 2020, after he was detained and questioned regarding a legal case involving allegations of bribery. The Taipei District Court ruled in July 2022 that Liao had violated the Anti-Corruption Act, sentenced him to eight years and six months imprisonment, and decided that he was to return NT$6.2 million in bribes. In February 2025, Liao was indicted on additional further charges. The Taipei District Court sentenced Liao to seven and a half years in prison on the corruption charges in November 2025.
