= 8th Legislative Yuan =

←	7th	9th	→

Overview
- Legislative body: Legislative Yuan
- Jurisdiction: Taiwan
- Meeting place: Legislative Yuan Building
- Term: 1 February 2012 – 31 January 2016
- Election: 2012 Taiwanese legislative election
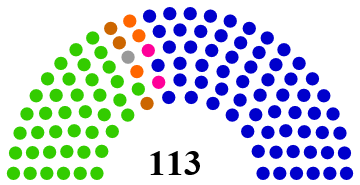
- Members: 113

The 8th Legislative Yuan was a term of members of the Legislative Yuan of Taiwan, from 1 February 2012 to 31 January 2016. Members were elected in the 14 January 2012 legislative election. The ruling Kuomintang (KMT) controlled the Legislative Yuan. Legislative highlights include a resolution to continue to support local tobacco growers, and a hearing to investigate the Chinese Communist Party's interference in the 2012 elections.

== Members ==
The list is arranged by constituency (district) and proportional representation (party list).

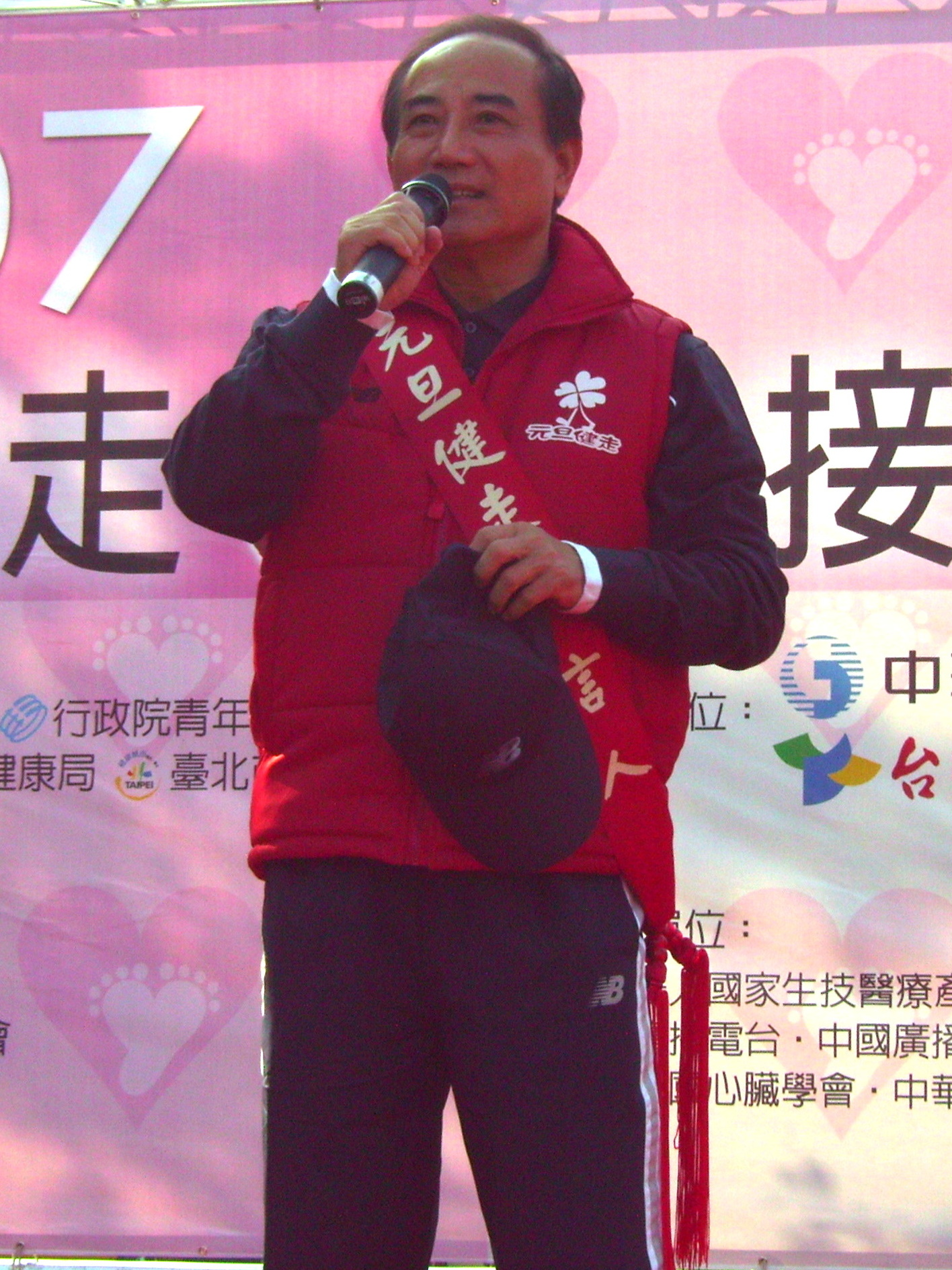
Wang Jin-pyng (KMT), speaker of Legislative Yuan (Party list)

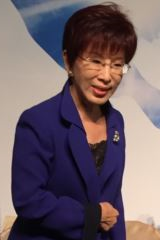
Hung Hsiu-chu (KMT), deputy speaker of Legislative Yuan (Party list)

Lai Shyh-bao (KMT, Taipei 8)

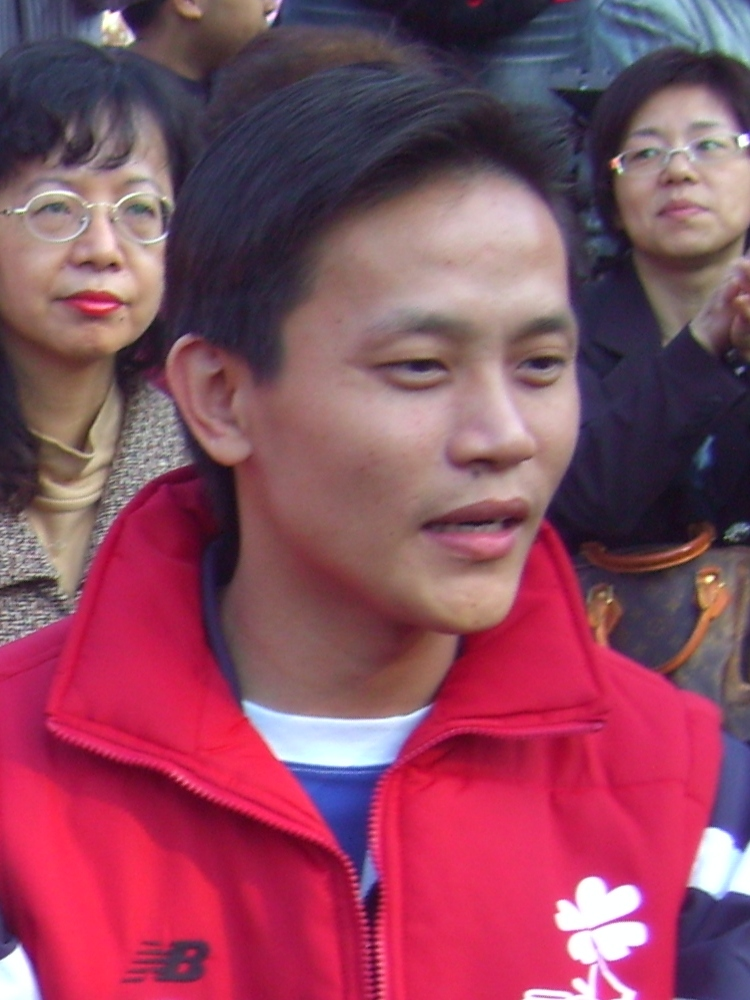
Huang Chih-hsiung (KMT, New Taipei 5)

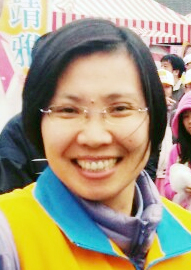
Hsu Hsin-ying (MKT, Hsinchu County)

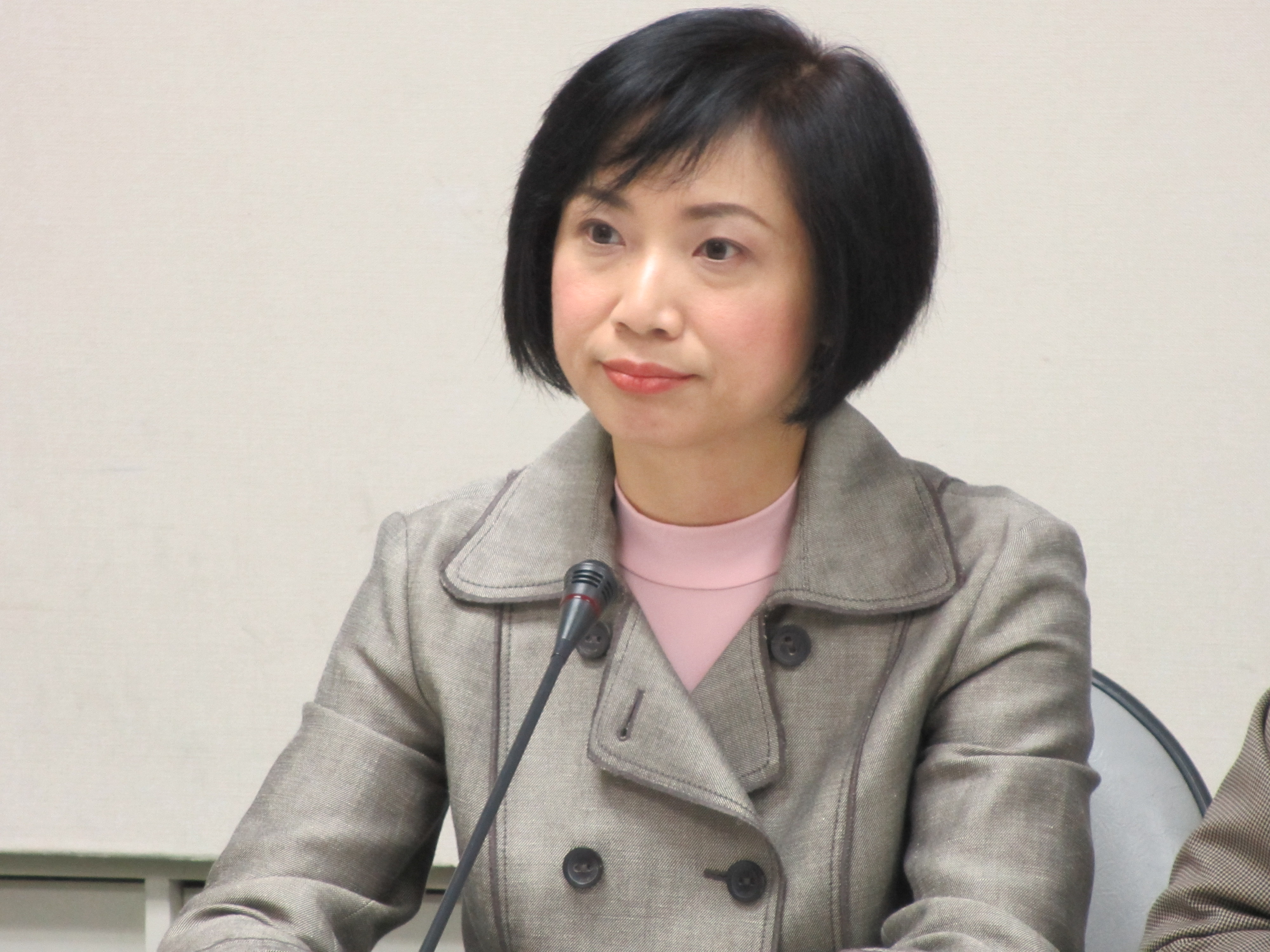
Ho Hsin-chun (DPP, Taichung 7)

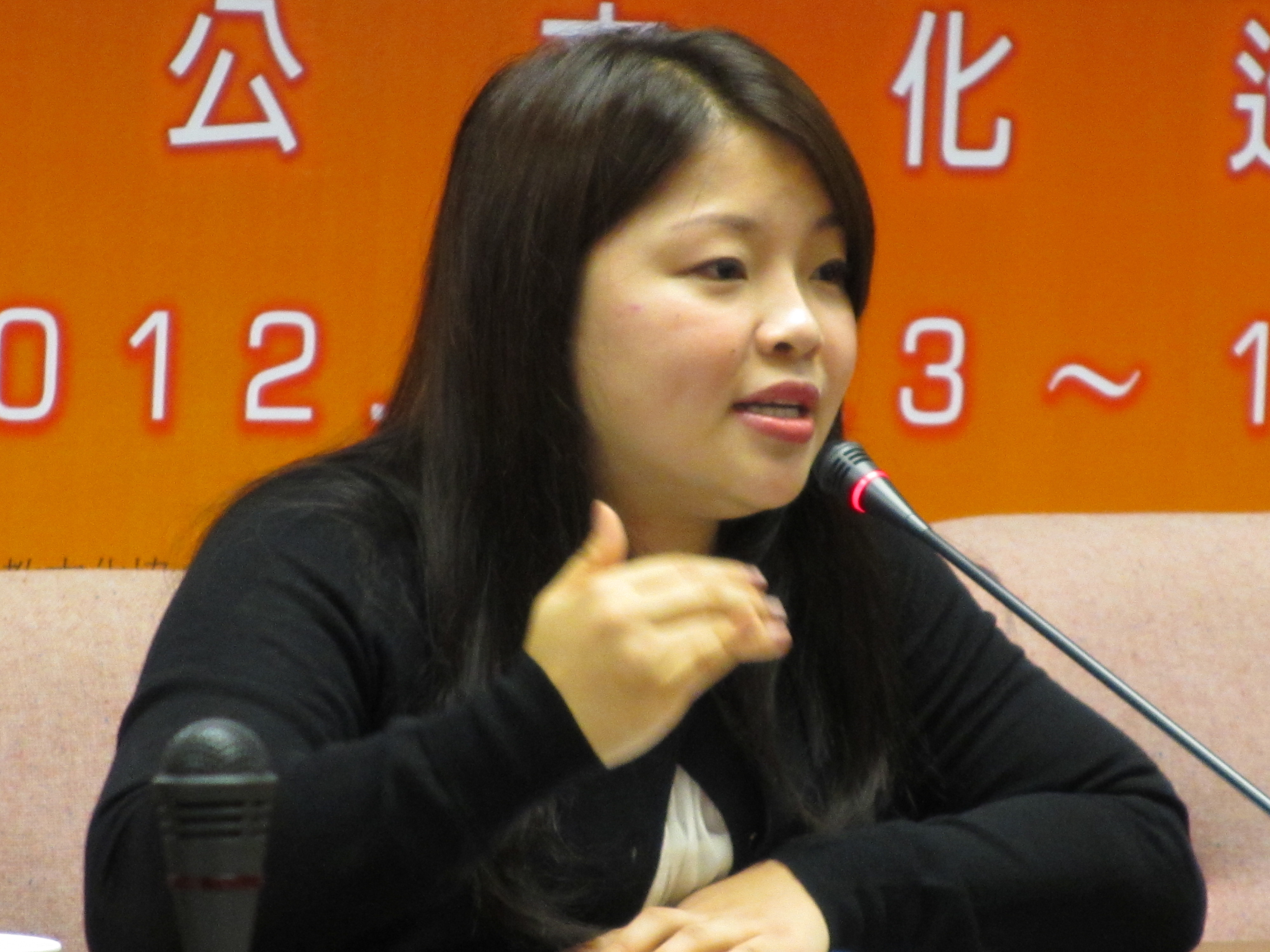
Chang Chia-chun (KMT, Yunlin 1)

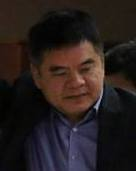
Chuang Jui-hsiung (DPP, Pingtung 3)

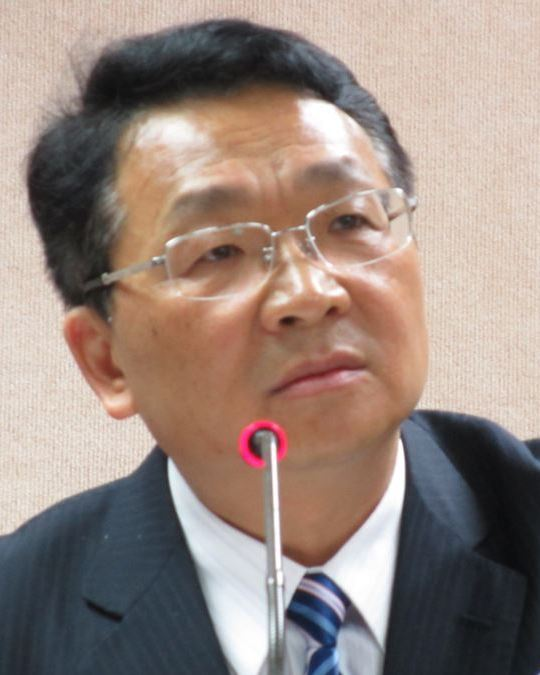
Chen Ou-po (DPP, Yilan)

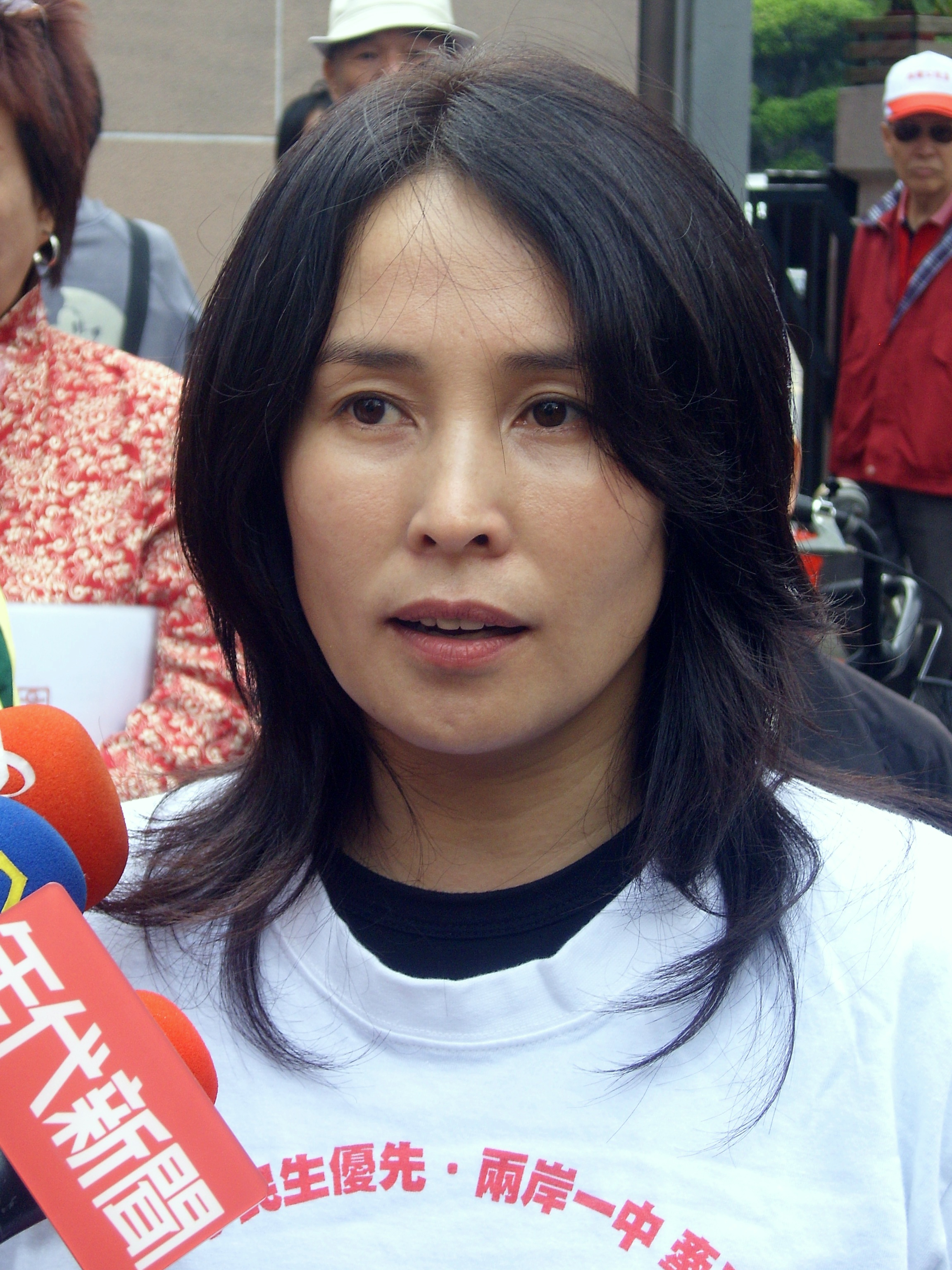
Kao Chin Su-mei (NPSU, Highland aborigines)

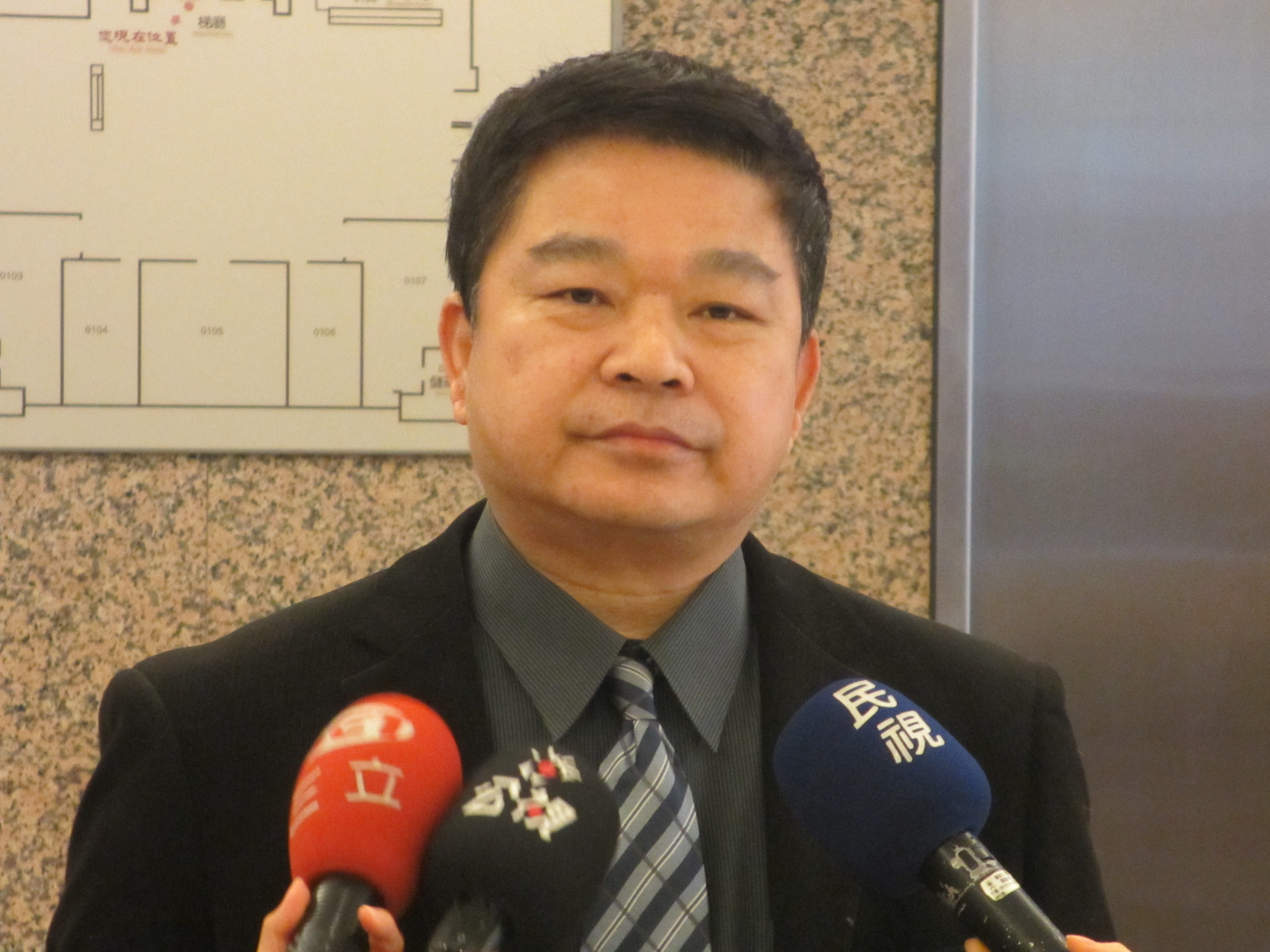
Tsai Huang-liang (DPP, party list)

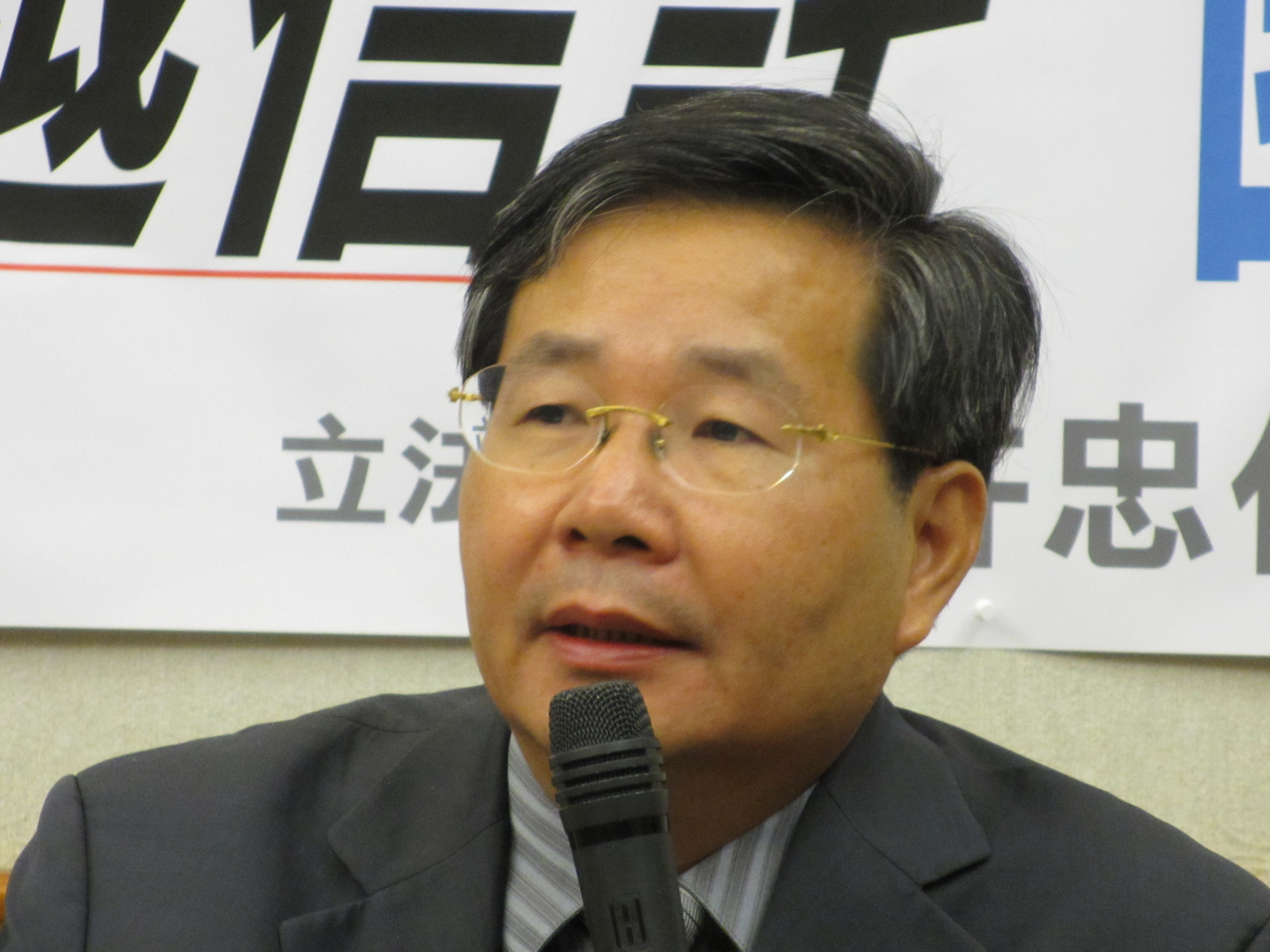
Hsu Chung-hsin (TSU, Party list)

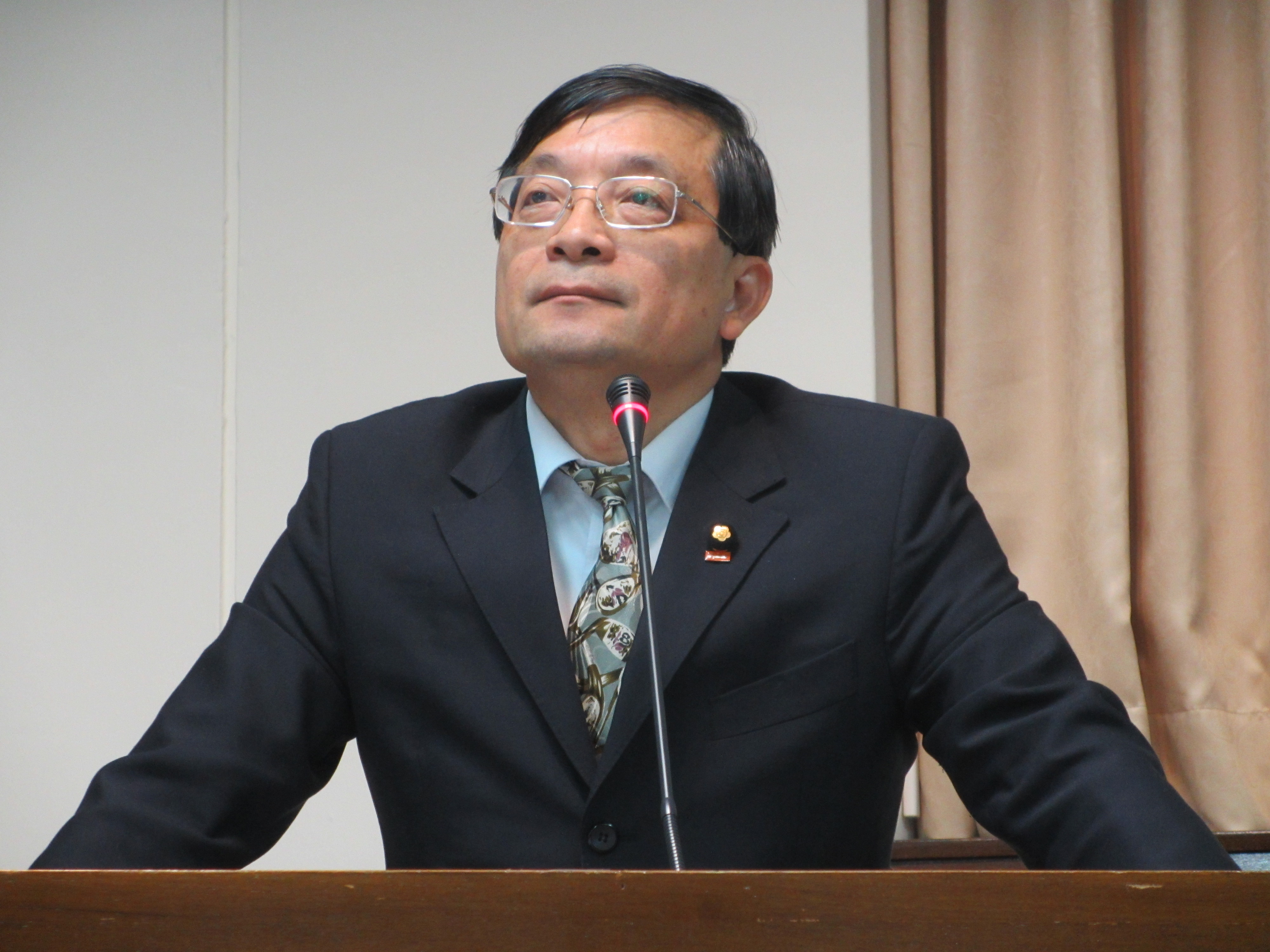
Lee Tung-hao (PFP, party list)

== Constituency ==
Constituency		Name	Pinyin	Chinese	Party
Changhua County	1st	Wang Huei-mei	Wáng Huìměi	王惠美	Kuomintang
Changhua County	2nd	Lin Tsang-min	Lín Cāngmǐn	林滄敏	Kuomintang
Changhua County	3rd	Cheng Ru-fen	Zhèng Rǔfēn	鄭汝芬	Kuomintang
Changhua County	4th	Wei Ming-ku	Wèi Mínggǔ	魏明谷	Democratic Progressive Party
Chiayi City		Lee Chun-yi	Li Jùnyì	李俊俋	Democratic Progressive Party
Chiayi County	1st	Wong Chung-chun	Wēng Zhòngjūn	翁重鈞	Kuomintang
Chiayi County	2nd	Chen Ming-wen	Chén Míngwén	陳明文	Democratic Progressive Party
Hsinchu City		Lu Hsueh-chang	Lǚ Xuézhāng	呂學樟	Kuomintang
Hsinchu County		Hsu Hsin-ying	Xú Xīnyíng	徐欣瑩	Kuomintang
Hualien County		Wang Ting-son	Wáng Tíngshēng	王廷升	Kuomintang
Kaohsiung City	1st	Chiu Yi-ying	Qiū Yìyíng	邱議瑩	Democratic Progressive Party
Kaohsiung City	2nd	Chiu Chih-wei	Qiū Zhìwěi	邱志偉	Democratic Progressive Party
Kaohsiung City	3rd	Huang Chao-shun	Huáng Zhāoshùn	黃昭順	Kuomintang
Kaohsiung City	4th	Lin Tai-hua	Lín Dàihuà	林岱樺	Democratic Progressive Party
Kaohsiung City	5th	Kuan Bi-ling	Guǎn Bìlíng	管碧玲	Democratic Progressive Party
Kaohsiung City	6th	Lee Kun-tse	Li Kūnzé	李昆澤	Democratic Progressive Party
Kaohsiung City	7th	Chao Tien-lin	Zhào Tiānlín	趙天麟	Democratic Progressive Party
Kaohsiung City	8th	Hsu Chih-chieh	Xǔ Zhìjié	許智傑	Democratic Progressive Party
Kaohsiung City	9th	Lin Kuo-cheng	Lín Guózhèng	林國正	Kuomintang
Keelung City		Hsieh Kuo-liang	Xiè Guóliáng	謝國樑	Kuomintang
Kinmen County		Yang Ying-hsiung	Yáng Yīngxióng	楊應雄	Kuomintang
Lienchiang County		Chen Hsueh-sheng	Chén Xuěshēng	陳雪生	Independent
Miaoli County	1st	Chen Chao-ming	Chén Chāomíng	陳超明	Kuomintang
Miaoli County	2nd	Hsu Yao-chang	Xú Yàochāng	徐耀昌	Kuomintang
Nantou County	1st	Ma Wen-chun	Mǎ Wénjūn	馬文君	Kuomintang
Nantou County	2nd	Lin Ming-chen	Lín Míngqín	林明溱	Kuomintang
New Taipei City	1st	Wu Yu-sheng	Wú Yùshēng	吳育昇	Kuomintang
New Taipei City	2nd	Lin Shu-fen	Lín Shūfēn	林淑芬	Democratic Progressive Party
New Taipei City	3rd	Gao Jyh-peng	Gāo Zhìpéng	高志鵬	Democratic Progressive Party
New Taipei City	4th	Lee Hung-chun	Li Hóngjūn	李鴻鈞	Kuomintang
New Taipei City	5th	Huang Chih-hsiung	Huáng Zhìxióng	黃志雄	Kuomintang
New Taipei City	6th	Lin Hung-chih	Lín Hóngchí	林鴻池	Kuomintang
New Taipei City	7th	Chiang Huei-chen	Jiāng Huìzhēn	江惠貞	Kuomintang
New Taipei City	8th	Chang Ching-chung	Zhāng Qìngzhōng	張慶忠	Kuomintang
New Taipei City	9th	Lin Te-fu	Lín Défú	林德福	Kuomintang
New Taipei City	10th	Lu Chia-chen	Lú Jiāchén	盧嘉辰	Kuomintang
New Taipei City	11th	Lo Ming-tsai	Luó Míngcái	羅明才	Kuomintang
New Taipei City	12th	Lee Ching-hua	Li Qìnghuá	李慶華	Kuomintang
Penghu County		Yang Yao	Yáng Yào	楊曜	Democratic Progressive Party
Pingtung County	1st	Su Chen-ching	Sū Zhènqīng	蘇震清	Democratic Progressive Party
Pingtung County	2nd	Wang Chin-shih	Wáng Jìnshì	王進士	Kuomintang
Pingtung County	3rd	Pan Men-an	Pān Mèng'ān	潘孟安	Democratic Progressive Party
Taichung City	1st	Tsai Chi-chang	Cài Qíchāng	蔡其昌	Democratic Progressive Party
Taichung City	2nd	Yen Chin-piao	Yán Qīngbiāo	顏清標	Kuomintang/Non-Partisan Solidarity Union
Taichung City	3rd	Yang Chiung-ying	Yáng Qióngyīng	楊瓊瓔	Kuomintang
Taichung City	4th	Tsai Chin-lung	Cài Jǐnlóng	蔡錦隆	Kuomintang
Taichung City	5th	Lu Shiow-yen	Lú Xiùyàn	盧秀燕	Kuomintang
Taichung City	6th	Lin Chia-lung	Lín Jiālóng	林佳龍	Democratic Progressive Party
Taichung City	7th	Ho Hsin-chun	Hé Xīnchún	何欣純	Democratic Progressive Party
Taichung City	8th	Johnny Chiang	Jiāng Qǐchén	江啟臣	Kuomintang
Tainan City	1st	Yeh Yi-jin	Yè Yijīn	葉宜津	Democratic Progressive Party
Tainan City	2nd	Huang Wei-cher	Huáng Wěizhé	黃偉哲	Democratic Progressive Party
Tainan City	3rd	Chen Ting-fei	Chén Tíngfēi	陳亭妃	Democratic Progressive Party
Tainan City	4th	Hsu Tain-tsair	Xǔ Tiāncái	許添財	Democratic Progressive Party
Tainan City	5th	Mark Chen Tan-sun	Chén Tángshān	陳唐山	Democratic Progressive Party
Taipei City	1st	Ting Shou-chung	Dīng Shǒuzhōng	丁守中	Kuomintang
Taipei City	2nd	Pasuya Yao	Yáo Wénzhì	姚文智	Democratic Progressive Party
Taipei City	3rd	Lo Shu-lei	Luó Shūlěi	羅淑蕾	Kuomintang
Taipei City	4th	Tsai Cheng-yuan	Cài Zhèngyuán	蔡正元	Kuomintang
Taipei City	5th	Lin Yu-fang	Lín Yùfāng	林郁方	Kuomintang
Taipei City	6th	Chiang Nai-shin	Jiǎng Nǎixīn	蔣乃辛	Kuomintang
Taipei City	7th	Fai Hrong-tai (Alex Fai)	Fèi Hóngtài	費鴻泰	Kuomintang
Taipei City	8th	Lai Shyh-bao	Lài Shìbǎo	賴士葆	Kuomintang
Taitung County		Liu Chao-how	Liú Zhàoháo	劉櫂豪	Democratic Progressive Party
Taoyuan City	1st	Chen Ken-te	Chén Gēndé	陳根德	Kuomintang
Taoyuan City	2nd	Liao Cheng-ching	Liào Zhèngjǐng	廖正井	Kuomintang
Taoyuan City	3rd	Chen Shei-saint	Chén Xuéshèng	陳學聖	Kuomintang
Taoyuan City	4th	Yang Li-huan	Yáng Lìhuán	楊麗環	Kuomintang
Taoyuan City	5th	Lu Yu-ling	Lǚ Yùlíng	呂玉玲	Kuomintang
Taoyuan City	6th	Sun Ta-chien	Sūn Dàqiān	孫大千	Kuomintang
Yilan County		Chen Ou-po	Chén Ōupò	陳歐珀	Democratic Progressive Party
Yunlin County	1st	Chang Chia-chun	Zhāng Jiājùn	張嘉郡	Kuomintang
Yunlin County	2nd	Liu Chien-kuo	Liú Jiànguó	劉建國	Democratic Progressive Party
Lowland Aborigine (3 seats)		Liao Kuo-tung	Liào Guódòng	廖國棟	Kuomintang
Lowland Aborigine (3 seats)		Jeng Tian-tsair	Zhèng Tiāncái	鄭天財	Kuomintang
Lowland Aborigine (3 seats)		Lin Cheng-er	Lín Zhèng'èr	林正二	People First Party
Highland Aborigine (3 seats)		Kung Wen-chi	Kǒng Wénjí	孔文吉	Kuomintang
Highland Aborigine (3 seats)		Kao Chin Su-mei	Gāo Jīn Sùméi	高金素梅	Non-Partisan Solidarity Union
Highland Aborigine (3 seats)		Chien Tung-ming	Jiǎn Dōngmíng	簡東明	Kuomintang

== Proportional Representation ==
Kuomintang
No.	Name	Pinyin	Chinese	Party
1	Wang Jin-pyng	Wáng Jīnpíng	王金平	Kuomintang
2	Wang Yu-min	Wáng Yùmǐn	王育敏	Kuomintang
3	Tseng Chu-wei	Zéng Jùwēi	曾巨威	Kuomintang
4	Yang Yu-hsin	Yáng Yùxīn	楊玉欣	Kuomintang
5	Chiau Wen-yan	Qiū Wényàn	邱文彥	Kuomintang
6	Hung Hsiu-chu	Hóng Xiùzhù	洪秀柱	Kuomintang
7	Wu Yu-jen	Wú Yùrén	吳育仁	Kuomintang
8	Tina Pan	Pān Wéigāng	潘維剛	Kuomintang
9	Chen Chen-hsiang	Chén Zhènxiāng	陳鎮湘	Kuomintang
10	Lee Guei-min	Li Guìmǐn	李貴敏	Kuomintang
11	Su Ching-chuan	Sū Qīngquán	蘇清泉	Kuomintang
12	Chen Pi-han	Chén Bìhán	陳碧涵	Kuomintang
13	Chan Kai-chen	Zhān Kǎichén	詹凱臣	Kuomintang
14	Hsu Shao-ping	Xú Shǎopíng	徐少萍	Kuomintang
15	Chi Kuo-tung	Jì Guódòng	紀國棟	Kuomintang
16	Chen Shu-hui	Chén Shūhuì	陳淑慧	Kuomintang
Democratic Progressive Party
No.	Name	Pinyin	Chinese	Party
1	Chen Chieh-ju	Chén Jiérú	陳節如	Democratic Progressive Party
2	Ker Chien-ming	Kē Jiànmíng	柯建銘	Democratic Progressive Party
3	Wu Yi-chen	Wú Yizhēn	吳宜臻	Democratic Progressive Party
4	Lee Ying-yuan	Li Yīngyuán	李應元	Democratic Progressive Party
5	Tien Chiu-chin	Tián Qiūjǐn	田秋堇	Democratic Progressive Party
6	Tsai Huang-liang	Cài Huángláng	蔡煌瑯	Democratic Progressive Party
7	Hsiao Bi-khim	Xiāo Měiqín	蕭美琴	Democratic Progressive Party
8	Chen Chi-mai	Chén Qímài	陳其邁	Democratic Progressive Party
9	Cheng Li-chun	Zhèng Lìjūn	鄭麗君	Democratic Progressive Party
10	Tuan Yi-kang	Duàn Yikāng	段宜康	Democratic Progressive Party
11	Yu Mei-nu	Yóu Měinǚ	尤美女	Democratic Progressive Party
12	Wu Ping-jui	Wú Bǐngruì	吳秉叡	Democratic Progressive Party
13	Hsueh Ling	Xuē Líng	薛凌	Democratic Progressive Party
Taiwan Solidarity Union
No.	Name	Pinyin	Chinese	Party
1	Hsu Chung-hsin	Xǔ Zhōngxìn	許忠信	Taiwan Solidarity Union
2	Huang Wen-ling	Huáng Wénlíng	黃文玲	Taiwan Solidarity Union
3	Lin Shih-chia	Lín Shìjiā	林世嘉	Taiwan Solidarity Union
People First Party
No.	Name	Pinyin	Chinese	Party
1	Lee Tung-hao (Thomas Lee)	Li Tóngháo	李桐豪	People First Party
2	Chang Show-foong	Zhāng Xiǎofēng	張曉風	People First Party

== See also ==
- 2012 Taiwan legislative election
- Seventh Legislative Yuan
- Ninth Legislative Yuan
