= Wang Zhongyu =

Wang Zhongyu is the atonal pinyin romanization of various Chinese names and may refer to:

- Wang Zhongyu (painter) (fl. 14th century), Chinese painter under the Ming dynasty
- Wang Zhongyu (politician, born 1891), politician of the Republic of China
- Wang Zhongyu (politician, born 1933), engineer and politician of the People's Republic of China
- Wang Chung-yu (born 1945), Taiwanese politician
