= Li Chen-hsiu =

Taiwanese politician (born 1973)

- 李貞秀
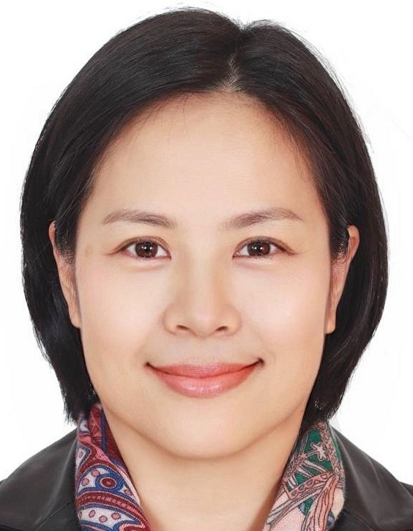
- Official portrait, 2026

Member of the Legislative Yuan Partial recognition
- In office 3 February 2026 – 13 April 2026
- Preceded by: Chang Chi-kai
- Succeeded by: Hsu Chung-hsin
- Constituency: Party-list (TPP)

Personal details
- Born: Li Zhenxiu; 15 April 1973 (age 53) Hengnan County, Hunan, China
- Citizenship: Disputed (see Nationality and legal controversy)
- Party: Taiwan People's Party (2020–2026)
- Education: Asia Eastern University of Science and Technology (AA); Tunghai University

Li Chen-hsiu (traditional Chinese: 李貞秀; simplified Chinese: 李贞秀; pinyin: Lǐ Zhēnxiù; Wade–Giles: Li Chen-hsiu; born 15 April 1973) is a Chinese-born Taiwanese politician. She served as a member of the Legislative Yuan for the Taiwan People's Party (TPP) from 3 February to 13 April 2026. Her term ended when her membership was revoked by the party.

Born in Hunan, China, she was the first mainland spouse to be nominated as a Taiwanese legislator since the implementation of the Cross-Strait Act in 1992. As a native of the People's Republic of China, her eligibility has been in dispute over suspicion of her actual renunciation of PRC citizenship, despite her candidacy being approved by the Central Election Commission. Due to the controversy over her dual citizenships, the central government, led by the Democratic Progressive Party (DPP), refused to accept her legitimacy as a legislator and boycotted her interpellation during her tenure.

== Early life and education ==
Li was born on April 15, 1973, in Hengnan County, Hunan, China. In 1993, she relocated to Taiwan following her marriage to a Taiwanese national and subsequently settled there. She has five children. She earned an associate's degree in electrical engineering from Asia Eastern University of Science and Technology. She is currently enrolled in an in-service master's program in Public Affairs at Tunghai University. Li worked at technology companies including Unitech and Foxconn, before later starting her own business. She has served as a founding member of the OSCAR Net-Zero Emissions Resilient Supply Chain Alliance, chair of the ESG Sustainable Development Committee of the Hsinchu Innovation and Entrepreneurship Association and founder of Xingheli Co., Ltd.

== Political career ==
According to Li's own account, she initially had little interest in politics. During Ko Wen-je's tenure as mayor of Taipei, she felt that Ko differed from traditional politicians and became a supporter. After Ko founded the Taiwan People's Party (TPP) in 2019, Li registered online as a party member in 2020. As she did not know any party members and could not provide a required recommender, she listed Foxconn founder Terry Gou as the recommender when completing the application. In 2021, after attending a TPP campaign event promoting the 2021 Taiwanese referendum in Hsinchu, she paid NT$10,000 to become a lifetime party member. In 2022, she was appointed campaign director for the TPP's Zhubei mayoral race, marking her formal involvement in electoral politics.

=== Legislative election ===
In the 2024 Taiwanese legislative election, Li participated in the TPP's at-large legislator selection process and was successfully nominated, ranking 15th on the party's list. Under the TPP legislative caucus's "two-year clause", she assumed office on 3 February 2026, becoming the first legislator of mainland China spouse background among Taiwan's new immigrant communities and while still holding Chinese citizenship. She was approved to enter legislative office by the Central Election Commission. During her legislator-elect period, she served as an assistant in the office of Huang Kuo-chang, convener of the TPP legislative caucus.

=== Nationality and legal controversy ===
Following the election of Li as a legislator, questions arose regarding her citizenship status and eligibility to assume office. Under the Constitution of the People's Republic of China and related Taiwan-affairs regulations, Taiwan residents are considered Chinese citizens. The administration of President Lai Ching-te holds the view that mainland Chinese spouses possess PRC citizenship and therefore fall under Article 20 of the Taiwanese nationality law, which concerns Republic of China nationals who also hold foreign nationality. According to this interpretation, Li would be required to renounce her PRC citizenship in order to assume office and to submit proof of loss of nationality within one year of taking office, otherwise the Legislative Yuan should dismiss her. The method of renunciation would depend on the laws of the relevant country. The law stipulates that the authority to dismiss a legislator rests with the Legislative Yuan. As such, the Executive Yuan and the Ministry of the Interior stated their legal position but do not possess the authority to invalidate Li's election or remove her from office. Li stated that she attempted to renounce her PRC citizenship by travelling to her hometown in China but that her application was rejected by Chinese authorities.

=== Removal from the TPP and Legislative Yuan ===
The TPP revoked Li's membership on 13 April 2026, saying that it was because of her alleged comments over the bribery scandal of party founder Ko Wen-je, especially she implied during a live streaming program that Ann Kao, the incumbent Mayor of Hsinchu, received seven million TWD bribes from Ko. Her comments angered many of her party members and demanded that the party take further disciplinary action against Li. Along with her party membership revoked, her tenure as a legislator was also terminated. Serving her two-month tenure, she became the shortest-serving member of the Legislative Yuan.

=== 2026 Zhubei mayoral campaign ===
In August 2026, Li announced her independent candidacy in the 2026 Zhubei mayoral election.
