= Lin Shih-chia =

Lin Shih-chia may refer to:

- Lin Shih-chia (archer)
- Lin Shih-chia (politician)
