= Chang Ming-hsiung =

Taiwanese politician (born 1944)

Chang Ming-hsiung (Chinese: 張明雄; born 2 December 1944) is a Taiwanese politician.

Chang attended the National Yuanlin Agricultural Vocational Senior High School and the Overseas Chinese Institute of Technology. As a member of the Kuomintang, Chang served Nantou County Council from 1982 to 1986, was elected to two terms as mayor of Zhushan from 1986 to 1994, followed by a four-year term on the Taiwan Provincial Council from 1994 to 1998. He was a member of the Legislative Yuan between 1999 and 2002. In 2001, Chang Ming-hsiung and Chang Ching-fang led a bipartisan agreement to amend the Pawn Shop Management Act, lowering the listed interest rate in the act to 24 percent. However, the final version of the law passed by the Legislative Yuan raised the interest rate to 48 percent.
