= Chang Chi-kai =

Taiwanese politician (born 1961)

Chang Chi-kai MLY
- 張啓楷
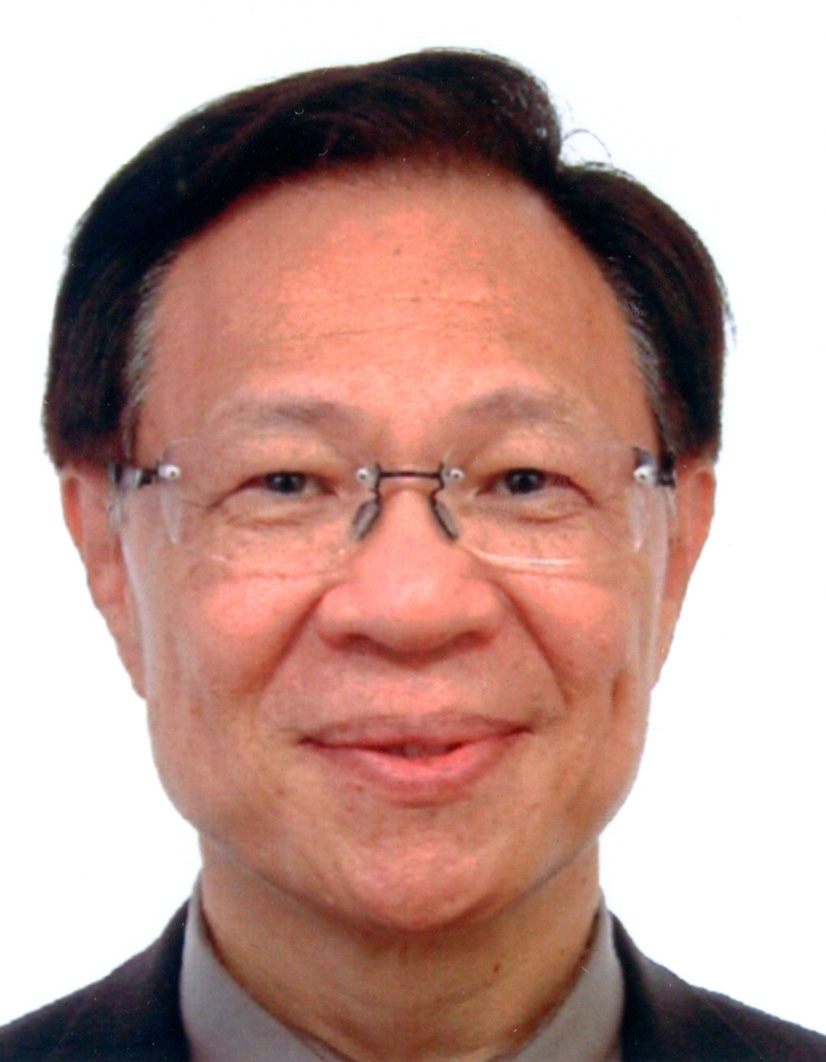

Member of the Legislative Yuan
- In office 1 February 2024 – January 2026
- Succeeded by: Li Zhenxiu
- Constituency: Party-list (TPP)

Personal details
- Born: 21 December 1962 (age 63) Dongshi, Chiayi County, Taiwan
- Party: Taiwan People's Party
- Education: National Chung Hsing University (BA); National Taiwan University (MA)

Chang Chi-kai (Chinese: 張啓楷; born 21 December 1962) is a Taiwanese journalist, television personality, and politician.

== Education and career ==
Chang graduated from National Chung Hsing University with a bachelor's degree in sociology. In 2010, he earned a master's degree in political science from National Taiwan University. His master's thesis was titled, "The Political Economy of Taiwan's Special Budget Development from 1945 to 2008".

Chang was a deputy editor for Era News, and hosted political talk shows for Era Television and TVBS.

Chang was elected to the Legislative Yuan in January 2024 running as a party-list candidate affiliated with the Taiwan People's Party, and contested the deputy speakership, losing to Johnny Chiang. In the 11th Legislative Yuan, Chang joined a parliamentary friendship group for Czechia and Austria. In May 2024, he commented on the Law Governing the Legislative Yuan's Power. In July, Chang was named head of a task force set up to investigate the Ministry of Agriculture's importation of eggs from 2022 to 2023, when the ministry was led by Chen Chi-chung. In line with TPP regulations, Chang announced his resignation from the Legislative Yuan in January 2026.
