= Mainland spouses =

Term used in Taiwan

The term "mainland spouses" (traditional Chinese: 大陸配偶; simplified Chinese: 大陆配偶; pinyin: Dàlù pèi'ǒu) or "Chinese spouses" (traditional Chinese: 中國配偶; simplified Chinese: 中国配偶; pinyin: Zhōngguó pèi'ǒu) is used primarily in Taiwan to refer to people from mainland China who are spouses of Taiwanese people. The Taiwanese government regards them as new residents of Taiwan in accordance with the law. The People's Republic of China refers to them as persons involved in cross-strait marriages rather than transnational marriages. The Terminology for Cross-Strait Marriage and Family Services implemented by the Ministry of Civil Affairs in December 2015 stipulates that the parties involved in cross-strait marriages are collectively referred to as cross-strait spouses, and mainland residents are referred to as spouse from Mainland.

Among cross-border marriages in Taiwan, the number of spouses from mainland China is the largest. As of 2025, there were 367,520 mainland spouses in Taiwan. Since more than 90% of the marriages are between women from mainland China and men from Taiwan, Taiwanese news media often refer to them as "mainland Chinese brides". Some people believe that mainland spouses are treated differently by the Republic of China government and their rights are inferior to those of foreign spouses.

== Legal status ==
The Cross-Strait Act defines "people of the Mainland Area" as residents who have household registration in the Mainland Area. Regarding spouses from Hong Kong and Macau, the definition in the Act Governing Relations between Hong Kong and Macau is different from that of "people of the Mainland Area". In practice, "people of the Mainland Area" are classified as "foreigners with special or special status" who are different from ordinary foreigners. The term is used to echo the preamble of the Additional Articles of the Constitution, which states that "it is necessary to meet the needs before national unification."

In 1992, the Taiwanese government opened up settlement opportunities for mainland spouses in Taiwan. According to relevant laws and regulations, mainland spouses can apply for dependent residence after being permitted to enter Taiwan. After four years of dependent residence, they can apply for long-term residence. After two years of long-term residence, they can apply for settlement by submitting proof of loss of their original place of residence. At this time (the minimum period is six years from the start of dependent residence), they can register their household and apply for a national identification card. Their status is changed to that of a citizen of Taiwan. Under the laws of the People's Republic of China, their status is changed to that of a resident of Taiwan.

The author of the Republic of China, Hsiao Li-ching, compared the rights of mainland spouses and foreign spouses, including the right to enter Taiwan, residency, settlement, work, academic recognition, and public service. Foreign spouses were superior to mainland spouses, while mainland spouses were subject to the greatest restrictions. In 2002, the Chen Shui-bian government planned to extend the period for mainland spouses to obtain national identification cards from eight years to eleven years, four years more than foreign spouses, but this was not implemented. In 2003, the Chen Shui-bian government implemented an interview system for mainland spouses visiting Taiwan, while there were no relevant regulations for foreign spouses. In 2009, the Ma Ying-jeou government shortened the period for mainland spouses to obtain national identification cards to six years, and abolished the restrictions on mainland spouses inheriting property, and relaxed the number of days for mainland spouses' parents to visit relatives. In 2016, Democratic Progressive Party (DPP) legislators overturned the bill that "shortened the period for mainland spouses to obtain national identification cards from six years to four years".

== Political activities ==
After mainland spouses obtain Taiwanese citizenship, they acquire the status of Taiwanese citizens and have the right to vote. However, according to the Cross-Strait Act, they can only serve as civil servants after ten years of holding Taiwanese citizenship. In 2006, the Judicial Yuan reviewed this legal provision, deeming it to be in accordance with the principle of proportionality, thus establishing the constitutional basis for regulating the political rights of mainland spouses.

Since there are more than 300,000 mainland spouses in Taiwan, many of them have obtained national identification cards, have the right to vote, and some have run for office. As of 2014, there are candidates such as Gao Dandan, who ran for the Kuomintang party representative, and Lu Yuexiang of the China Production Party, who actively assisted the Kuomintang in the election. In 2018, a mainland spouse surnamed Huang was elected as a village chief in Taipei City; in 2022, mainland spouses were elected as village chiefs in Taipei City and Hualien County. In August 2021, mainland spouse Shi Xueyan was promoted to Nantou County Councilor and served her term until December 2022, becoming the first mainland spouse county and city councilor since the implementation of the Cross-Strait Relations Act.

As the Taiwanization movement spread, more Taiwanese have begun viewing "China" as a "foreign country". Therefore, some people question whether mainland spouses are "possessing foreign nationality" and that, according to the Nationality Law, they should "lose Chinese nationality" in order to hold public office. However, in reality, according to the laws of the People's Republic of China, all residents of Taiwan are Chinese citizens and possess the nationality of the People's Republic of China, regardless of whether they were born in mainland China. In practice before 2022, the Election Commission or government agencies would not require mainland spouses elected as local representatives to "renounce Chinese nationality".

In December 2024, in response to the fact that Li Zhenxiu of the Taiwan People's Party was going to be elected as a legislator, the Lai Ching-te government cited Article 20 of the Nationality Act to abolish the public office of Shih Hsueh-yen, who had already stepped down as a councilor of Nantou County. This matter caused widespread controversy. Lin Kuo-cheng, a legislator from the Taiwan People's Party, believes that since the government has found a contradiction in the law, it should take the initiative to amend it. She said that whether it is amending the Nationality Act or the Cross-Strait Relations Act, the government should take action, otherwise, the current system would be very unfair to mainland spouses in politics. Shih Hsueh-yen filed an administrative appeal on this matter, which was rejected, and then filed an administrative lawsuit with the Taipei High Administrative Court.

In August 2025, Fuli Township, Hualien County, dismissed Deng Wanhua, the village chief of Xuetian Village, at the request of the Ministry of the Interior. Township Chief Jiang Dongcheng said that he did not agree with the Ministry of the Interior's interpretation of Taiwan and the mainland as two countries and that "the mainland spouse has foreign nationality". However, the central government threatened to send him to the Control Yuan for investigation for "negligence of duty" and strongly demanded that the local government dismiss him. Therefore, he decided to dismiss him to make the dispute transparent and hoped that the judicial power would make a determination through administrative litigation. Before the judicial litigation, the case went through administrative appeal. On October 29, the Hualien County Government ruled to revoke the dismissal. In response to the county government's appeal decision, the Ministry of the Interior said that the local government should handle the matter according to the central government's interpretation and there was no room for other interpretations. It will send another letter to the Fuli Township Office, requesting that it handle the dismissal in accordance with the Nationality Act and the interpretation of the central competent authority.

On November 20, Lo Chih-chiang, secretary-general of the Kuomintang caucus in the Legislative Yuan, said that he would propose to amend the Nationality Act to explicitly exclude the application of the article to the "Chinese nationality" of mainland spouses who have already naturalized. Huang Kuo-chang, convener of the Taiwan People's Party caucus in the Legislative Yuan, said on November 21 that the Lai Ching-te government had abandoned the correct handling method of the Tsai Ing-wen government and arbitrarily interpreted or applied the law, infringing on the rights and interests of new immigrants. If the interpretation, application and amendment of the Cross-Strait Act are returned to the original state, the matter can be rectified. He also said the TPP would continue to proceed normally with the replacement of Lee Chen-hsiu under the "two-year clause" for legislators.

At the same time, there are four similar cases, including Wang Minru, the head of Xinyi Village in Songshan District, Taipei City; Teng Yuelan, the head of Yanshou Village in Tucheng District, New Taipei City; Lin Xiuzhen, the head of Chongnan Village in Zhonghe District; and Peng Xiaolin, the head of Kejian Village in Xinwu District, Taoyuan City. These cases are facing doubts about the application of law and the determination of legal issues. The relevant municipal government units are discussing the matter with the central government. In fact, the Ministry of the Interior has already sent letters to the Control Yuan in May 2025 requesting investigation and handling of the dismissal of mainland spouses.

== Statistics ==
According to statistics from the National Immigration Agency, as of 2025, a total of 367,520 mainland spouses had married Taiwanese. Among them, 23,624 were male and 343,896 were female. They are the largest group of foreign spouses in Taiwan (including those from Hong Kong and Macau). In 2008, there were about 30,000 mainland spouses who obtained work permits through family reunification, with the majority being economically disadvantaged and occupationally disadvantaged.

=== Total number of people ===
- This table is progressive and is not updated annually.
- The statistics published on the website of the National Immigration Agency of the Ministry of the Interior are from 2004 onwards. This table only includes citizens whose original nationality was the People's Republic of China and also includes those who have acquired the nationality of the Republic of China, in order to conform to the definition in this article.
- Statistics for 2014 up to the end of September.
- "Percentage" refers to the percentage of all foreign spouses.
- Since 2009, the Ministry of the Interior has kept separate statistics on the number of applicants and the number of approved applicants. This table only includes the number of applications.

Year	Male	Female	Total	Percentage (%)	Ref.
2004	9,815	194,990	204,805	60.86	
2005	10,256	212,954	223,210	61.22	
2006	10,677	227,508	238,185	62.15	
2007	11,033	240,165	251,198	62.95	
2008	11,408	251,293	262,701	63.54	
2009	11,867	262,155	274,022	63.80	
2010	12,427	271,702	284,129	64.12	
2011	13,248	282,847	296,095	64.45	
2012	14,135	292,379	306,514	64.78	
2013	14,939	300,966	315,905	64.91	
2014	15,500	306,183	321,683	64.83	
2016	17,044	318,338	335,382	64.36	
2017	17,193	320,645	337,838	63.68	
2018	17,821	325,049	342,870	63.05	
2019	18,975	330,157	349,132	62.63	
2020	19,314	331,609	350,923	62.08	
2021	19,554	332,360	351,914	61.76	
2022	20,390	334,734	355,124	61.45	
2023	22,027	339,540	361,567	61.02	
2024	23,319	343,272	366,591	60.47	
2025	23,624	343,896	367,520	59.72	
