= Chang Ching-fang =

Taiwanese politician

Chang Ching-fang MLY
- 張清芳

Member of the Legislative Yuan
- In office 1 February 1999 – 31 January 2005
- Constituency: Taipei County 1

Personal details
- Born: 23 November 1952 (age 73)
- Party: Democratic Progressive Party
- Education: Soochow University (LLB); Barrington University (MBA)

Chang Ching-fang (Chinese: 張清芳; pinyin: Zhāng Qīngfāng; born 23 November 1952) is a Taiwanese politician.

== Education ==
Chang was educated at Ta-Tung Primary School, Shu-Lin High School, then Heng-Yi Senior High School. He graduated from Soochow University, where he received a Bachelor of Laws, and then Barrington University, where he earned a Master of Business Administration.

== Political career ==
Chang was first elected to the legislature in December 1998, as a Democratic Progressive Party representative of Taipei County. Taiwan Solidarity Union candidate Liao Pen-yen was expected to claim some of Chang's vote share in 2001, but both were elected to office. Chang received support from the DPP to run for a third term in 2004, but lost.

During his first term on the Legislative Yuan, Chang drew attention to a number of environmental concerns, including pollution of the Kaoping River, and the environmental effect of the Longmen Nuclear Power Plant. He worked with Chai Trong-rong to pass stricter law against electoral fraud. Additionally, Chang backed efforts to regulate imported drugs.

Chang commented frequently on exchanges between Taiwan and China, mainly in relation to tourism. In August 2000, he called out Taipower for importing Chinese gravel illegally for use in building the Longmen nuclear plant. Later that year, he opined that an increase in Chinese visitors would expose Taiwan to increased espionage. In March 2002, Chang criticized brokers that defrauded Taiwanese students who wished to pursue higher education in China. He was supportive of an initiative allowing children of taishang to study in Kinmen, rather than the Chinese educational system. In October 2002, John Chang announced that 121 lawmakers had signed his petition advocating airline flights across the Taiwan Strait. One of the signatories was Chang Ching-fang, but he pulled his support days later. Among Chang Ching-fang's counterproposals included that flights from China to Taiwan transit in Okinawa, and that Taiwan's government lift select restrictions on Chinese entrepreneurs to elicit further investment in Taiwanese real estate. Chang supported Chen Shui-bian's decision to shift Cross-Strait policy away from "no haste, be patient." However, Chang was largely critical of its replacement, the three links. In 2004, Chang claimed that China treated Taiwanese businesspeople unfairly, especially those who supported the Democratic Progressive Party.

Chang Ching-fang maintained an interest in national security. In June 2000, Chang asked the Control Yuan to investigate a former National Security Bureau official who visited China days after retirement. In October, Chang submitted evidence in a separate legal case implicating the NSB's Liu Kuan-chun, who was suspected of embezzling money from the agency. Chang reported to the NSB in March 2002 that Liu was in Canada.

== Controversy ==
While in office, Chang noted the underworld connections of Lin Ming-yi, Lo Fu-chu, and Wu Tse-yuan.

In January 2002, Chang and Yeh Yi-jin accused several of their legislative colleagues of accepting bribes. In April, Chang accused legislator Wang Chung-yu, former president of the Association of Industry for Environmental Protection ROC, of using the group's funds improperly.

In November 2003, Chang alleged that James Soong had an affair with Yang Yun-tai. Members of Soong's People First Party filed a lawsuit against Chang. Yang did the same, and the court ruled in her favor in August 2005.

In December 2003, Chang called a press conference to present evidence that Pan Jung-kuang had joked about Chen Shui-bian while giving a lecture. Pan apologized after Democratic Progressive Party members filed suit against him.

In February 2004, Chang sued Thomas Lee for libel, because Lee had accused Chang of involvement in black gold politics. Chang later filed a related lawsuit against Chen Yu-hao.
