= Chen Pi-han =

Taiwanese politician

Chen Pi-han (Chinese: 陳碧涵) is a Taiwanese politician.

== Education and teaching career ==
Chen attended Wu-Ling Senior High School, then studied physical education at Chinese Culture University before completing a master's degree at the University of Tsukuba and a doctorate in education at the University of Southern California. She taught at the National Taiwan University of Physical Education and Sport and was dean of the National Taiwan College of Performing Arts. While at the NTCPA, she designed a program that became the Hakka Youth Cultural Troupe.

== Political career ==
Chen was placed on the Kuomintang party list and elected to the Legislative Yuan in 2012 via proportional representation. In March 2012, Chen opined that the government should help younger people by calibrating the compatibility of university courses with job market demands. In August of that year, she and fellow legislator Apollo Chen organized a public hearing to discuss the development of visual arts. In 2013, Chen asked the Ministry of Economic Affairs to present analysis on the effects that joining the Trans-Pacific Partnership would have on agriculture in Taiwan, and commented favorably on the professionalism of David Lin in the aftermath of the Guang Da Xing No. 28 incident. In 2014, Chen signed off on a proposal to allow Taiwanese police officers the use of pepper spray. In 2015, Chen commented on the introduction of new educational curriculum, and expressed support for Ma Ying-jeou to report to the Legislative Yuan and discuss his meeting with Xi Jinping, additionally suggesting that Democratic Progressive Party lawmakers not boycott the proceedings.
