= Chen Shu-hui =

Taiwanese politician

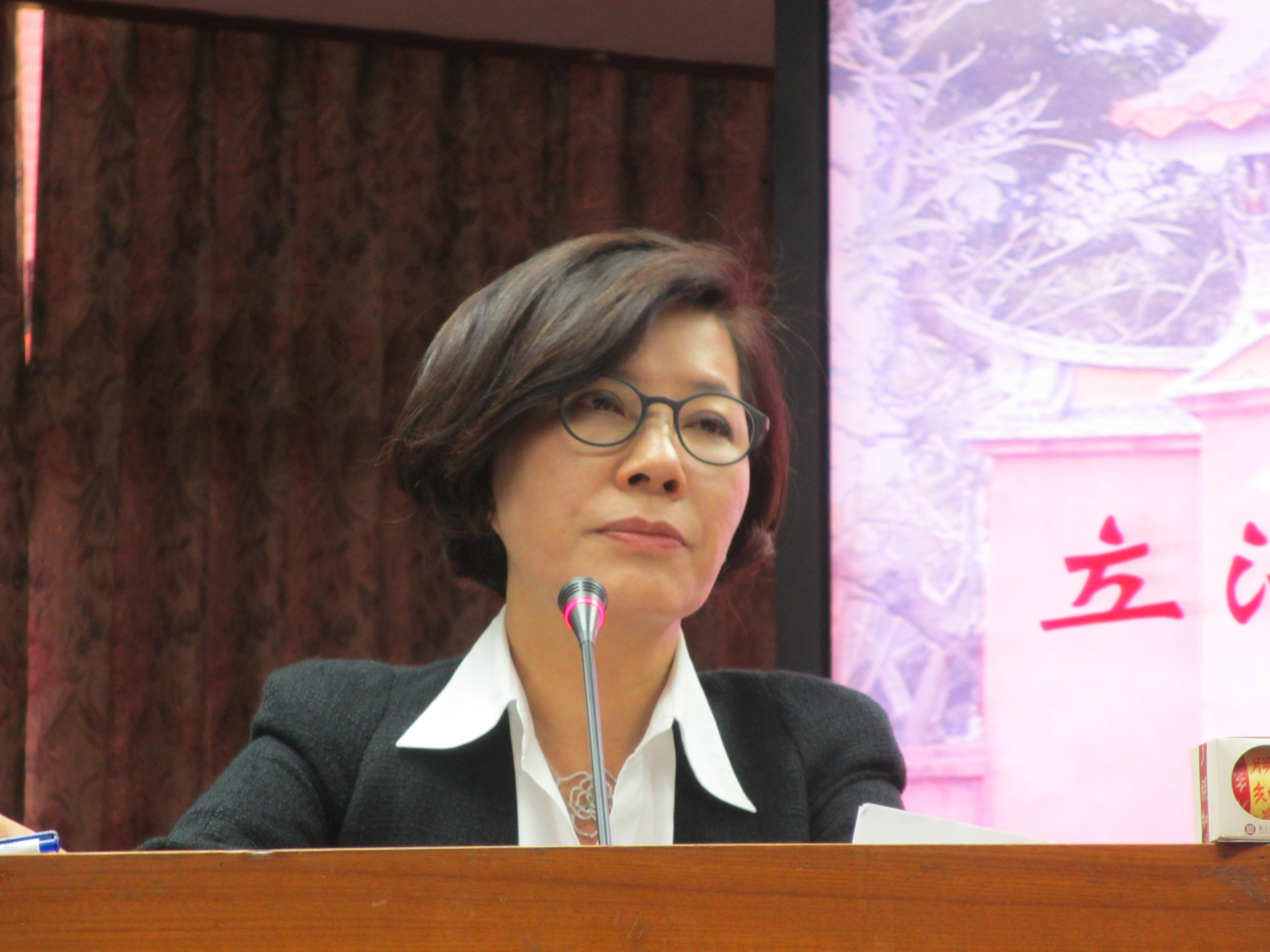
Chen Shu-hui

Chen Shu-hui (traditional Chinese: 陳淑慧; simplified Chinese: 陈淑慧; pinyin: Chén Shúhuì; Wade–Giles: Ch'en^{2} Shu^{2}-hui^{4}) is a member of the Kuomintang and a former member of the Legislative Yuan in Taiwan.

== See also ==
- Eighth Legislative Yuan
