= Hsu Chung-hsin =

Taiwanese legal scholar and politician (born 1965)

- 許忠信
- Official portrait, 2026

Member of the Legislative Yuan
- Incumbent
- Assumed office 22 April 2026
- Preceded by: Li Chen-hsiu
- Constituency: Party-list
- In office 1 February 2012 – 1 February 2014
- Succeeded by: Lai Cheng-chang

Personal details
- Born: 1 June 1965 (age 61) Tainan, Taiwan
- Party: Taiwan People's Party (after 2023); Taiwan Solidarity Union (2011–2015)
- Education: National Taiwan University (LLB); National Chengchi University (LLM); University of Cambridge (PhD)
- Profession: Law professor

Military service
- Branch/service: Republic of China Army
- Years of service: 1988–1990
- Rank: Second lieutenant

Hsu Chung-hsin (Chinese: 許忠信; pinyin: Xǔ Zhōngxìn; born 1 June 1965) is a Taiwanese legal scholar and politician who has served as a member of the Legislative Yuan since 2026. A member of the Taiwan People's Party (TPP), he was previously an at-large legislator for the Taiwan Solidarity Union (TSU) from 2012 to 2014.

== Early life and education ==
Hsu was born on 1 June 1965 in Tainan, Taiwan. He was born in the city's Annan District, although his family later relocated to Xinshi District. His father was a Republic of China Navy veteran who worked as an ox-cart operator. When Hsu was three years old, his parents sold his mother's dowry to purchase a motorized three-wheeled cargo vehicle, known locally as an "iron ox" tricycle (鐵牛三輪車), and moved into rented accommodation in Xinshi to establish a transportation business.

Hsu attended Xinshi Elementary School and Xinshi Junior High School. He then finished high school at National Tainan First Senior High School, where he initially was placed on its natural sciences curriculum before transferring to social sciences in his second year. After high school, he graduated from National Taiwan University with a Bachelor of Laws, specializing in political science and international relations. He then served two years in the Republic of China Army as a military logistics officer stationed in Chiayi.

In November 1990, Hsu passed a qualifying examination in law in March 1991. He passed Taiwan's national bar examination in 1992 and clerked at the law firm Formosa Transnational Attorneys at Law (萬國法律事務所). In 1994, he earned a Master of Laws (LL.M.) from National Chengchi University, where he wrote a thesis titled, Liability for Damages Arising from Copyright Infringement (著作權侵害之損害賠償責任). He then briefly began doctoral studies in law at the university. During his doctoral studies, he studied international economic and trade law under Tsai Ing-wen, who was then a professor there. After he obtained his master's degree, Hsu was awarded a Ministry of Education scholarship to pursue doctoral studies overseas. He earned his Ph.D. in international economic law from the University of Cambridge in 2000.

== Academic career ==
After receiving his doctorate from Cambridge, Hsu became an adjunct professor of law at Fu Jen Catholic University, where he taught until 2004. He then became an adjunct professor of law at National Cheng Kung University, where he was promoted to an associate professor of law in 2006 and a full professorship in 2009. He has also been a visiting scholar at Heidelberg University, an adviser to the International Trade Commission of the Ministry of Economic Affairs, and a chief arbitrator for the International Chamber of Commerce. He has also served as a member of the Republic of China Air Force's committee for the protection of the rights of officers and enlisted personnel.

== Legislative Yuan ==
=== First term, 2012–2014 ===
Hsu being interviewed by Public Television Service at the Legislative Yuan in August 2013

In 2007, Hsu gave an interview to the southern Taiwanese underground radio station Taiwanese Club in 2007 to oppose the Economic Cooperation Framework Agreement (ECFA), and became a regular guest on the station afterwards. He went on to give 400 speeches against the ECFA across Taiwan. He was an advocate of Taiwan independence and was nominated as the first legislator-at-large candidate for the Taiwan Solidarity Union (TSU). During the 2012 legislative election, Hsu, who had gained nationwide fame for his campaign against the ECFA, toured the country with TSU chairman Huang Kun-huei, promising voters that each of the party's at-large seats would be served by two lawmakers in rotation.

Hsu in October 2013 at the Legislative Yuan's Economics Committee

Hsu won a seat in the 8th Legislative Yuan and took office on 1 February 2012, serving on the Economics Committee and the Procedure Committee. He was the convener of the TSU legislative caucus. Hsu's interpellations mixed Mandarin, Taiwanese Hokkien, English and German, which at times confused legislators.

Under the TSU's two-year rotation rule, Hsu resigned from the legislature in 2014 and returned to teaching at National Cheng Kung University. His resignation took effect on 1 February 2014, and his seat was filled by Lai Cheng-chang. He withdrew from the TSU in 2015.

=== Second term, 2026–present ===
Hsu joined the Taiwan People's Party in 2023. He was ranked 16th on the TPP's party list for the 2024 legislative election, behind Li Chen-hsiu. In 2026, he became deputy director of the TPP's Policy Committee.

After the TPP expelled Li Chen-hsiu in April 2026, Hsu was expected to fill her seat. On 15 April 2026, the Central Election Commission announced that Hsu would fill the vacant seat. He was sworn in on 22 April 2026. He took Li's place on the Internal Administration Committee. During the legislature's fifth session, he was also a convener of the Expenditure Audit Committee.

== Tainan mayoral campaigns (2018, 2022) ==
On 26 May 2018, Hsu announced his candidacy for the Tainan mayoralty as an independent. At the time, he was the vice-principal of the Ketagalan Institute. In the 2018 election, Hsu received about 45,000 votes, finishing fifth among six candidates.

On 14 July 2022, Hsu announced that he would again run for Mayor of Tainan as an independent. Former Tainan County magistrate Su Huan-chih served as chairman of his campaign headquarters. Hsu was a member of the Taiwan Second Democratic Movement Coalition, which Su had initiated. In the 2022 election, Hsu received 38,697 votes, or 4.35 percent of the vote.
