= Chan Kai-chen =

Taiwanese politician

Chan Kai-chen (Chinese: 詹凱臣) is a Taiwanese politician.

Chan earned a Master of Business Administration at Wisconsin International University. He served on the Overseas Compatriot Affairs Commission, then subsequently won election to the 8th Legislative Yuan via party list proportional representation as a Kuomintang candidate. As a legislator, Chan traveled to the Pratas Islands in May 2012 to draw attention to territorial disputes in the South China Sea. Near the end of that year, Chan commented on the use of Simplified Chinese characters in downloadable teaching materials on the Overseas Chinese Affairs Council website, describing their use as well-intended but inappropriate, and on Taiwanese contributions to the regional economy of Asia. In 2014, he joined a group of Kuomintang members in visiting Vietnam-based Taiwanese businesses after anti-China protests in the country. That same year, he supported a proposal to permit Taiwanese police officers the use of pepper spray.
