= Chiau Wen-yan =

Taiwanese politician and architect

- 邱文彥
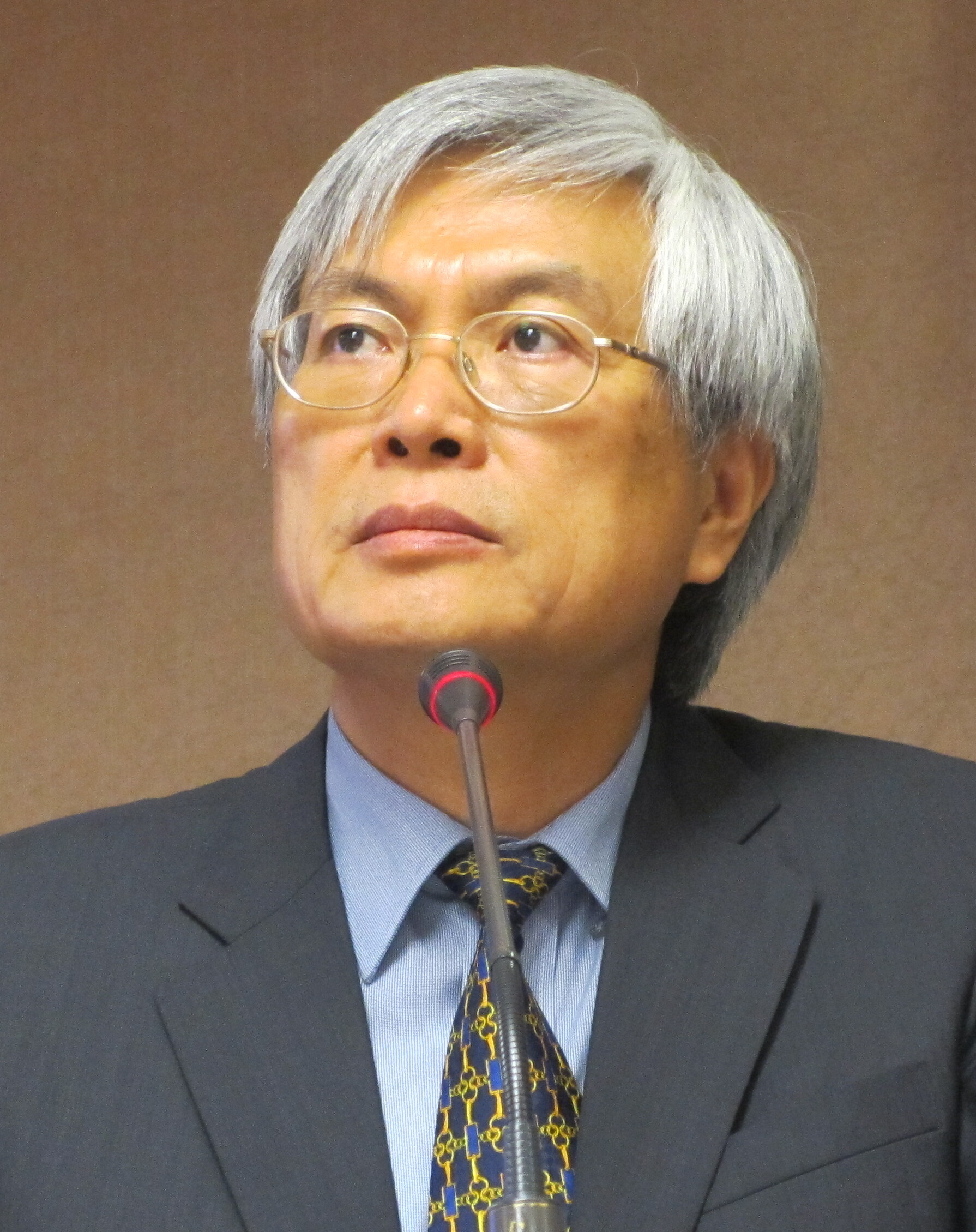
- Chiau in 2014

Member of Legislative Yuan
- In office 1 February 2012 – 31 January 2016

Personal details
- Born: 17 July 1953 (age 72) Pingtung County, Taiwan
- Party: Kuomintang
- Education: National Cheng Kung University (BS); National Chung Hsing University (MA); University of Pennsylvania (MA, PhD)
- Scientific career
- Fields: Urban planning
- Thesis: Hazardous waste management: Establishing a framework for Taiwan (1991)
- Doctoral advisor: Wen K. Shieh

Chinese name
- Traditional Chinese: 邱文彥
- Simplified Chinese: 邱文彦
Transcriptions
Standard Mandarin
- Hanyu Pinyin: Qiū Wényàn

Chiau Wen-yan (Chinese: 邱文彥; pinyin: Qiū Wényàn: born 17 July 1953) is a Taiwanese urban planner, architect, and politician. He was the member of Legislative Yuan, a professor and the former director of the Institute of Marine Affairs and Resource Management at National Taiwan Ocean University.

== Early life and education ==
Chiau was born in Pingtung County in 1953. His mother, Dai-tai Moei, was Hakka Chinese.

After high school, Chiau graduated from National Cheng Kung University in 1976 with a Bachelor of Science (B.S.) in urban planning and earned a master's degree in urban planning in 1980 from National Chung Hsing University. He then completed advanced studies in the United States, where he earned a Master of Arts (M.A.) in 1989 and a Ph.D. in 1991, both from the University of Pennsylvania in urban planning and regional planning.

When Chiau was a student at the National Cheng Kung University, he served as President of the Fine Art Club, and studied under Professor Guo Bai-chuan (郭柏川) for sketching, Professor Ma Den-Fieu (馬電飛) for watercolor painting, Professor Tsai Mao-song (蔡茂松) for traditional Chinese painting, and Professor Wang Jia-cheng (王家誠) for design. Chiau has won the first prizes in both college group and social group in the "Ink Painting and Sketching Competition in Southern Taiwan’s Seven Counties," with the works collected in Tainan Social Education Center. Chiau has also won the first prize (Golden Ring Award) in the traditional Chinese painting category of the national "Qingxi Literature and Art Award" for the military reserve force. Some of his ballpoint pen drawings are preserved in [Chiau Wen-yan's Travel Essays].

== Career ==
He was honored with the 2015 National Cheng Kung University Distinguished Alumni Award in November 2015 and the Lifetime Contribution Award by the Taiwan Institute of Landscape Architects in January 2016. Chiau's specialties are environmental planning and management, especially with regard to the areas of city and regional planning, climate change, coastal zone management, wetland conservation, ecotourism, underwater heritage, ocean policies and environmental law. In fact, Chiau drafted Taiwan's Environmental Education Act, which was passed in 2010. In 1995 and again in 2001, the Canadian Trade Office in Taipei honored him with the Canadian Studies Award for his research on coastal zone management and marine protected areas in Canada. Chiau served as a representative of the Chinese Taipei delegation in the APEC Working Group Meeting on Marine Resource Conservation and Fisheries, which led to the common APEC journals for the Marine Resource Conservation Working Group and the Fisheries Working Group. He also held the post of editor of the international journal Ocean and Coastal Management.

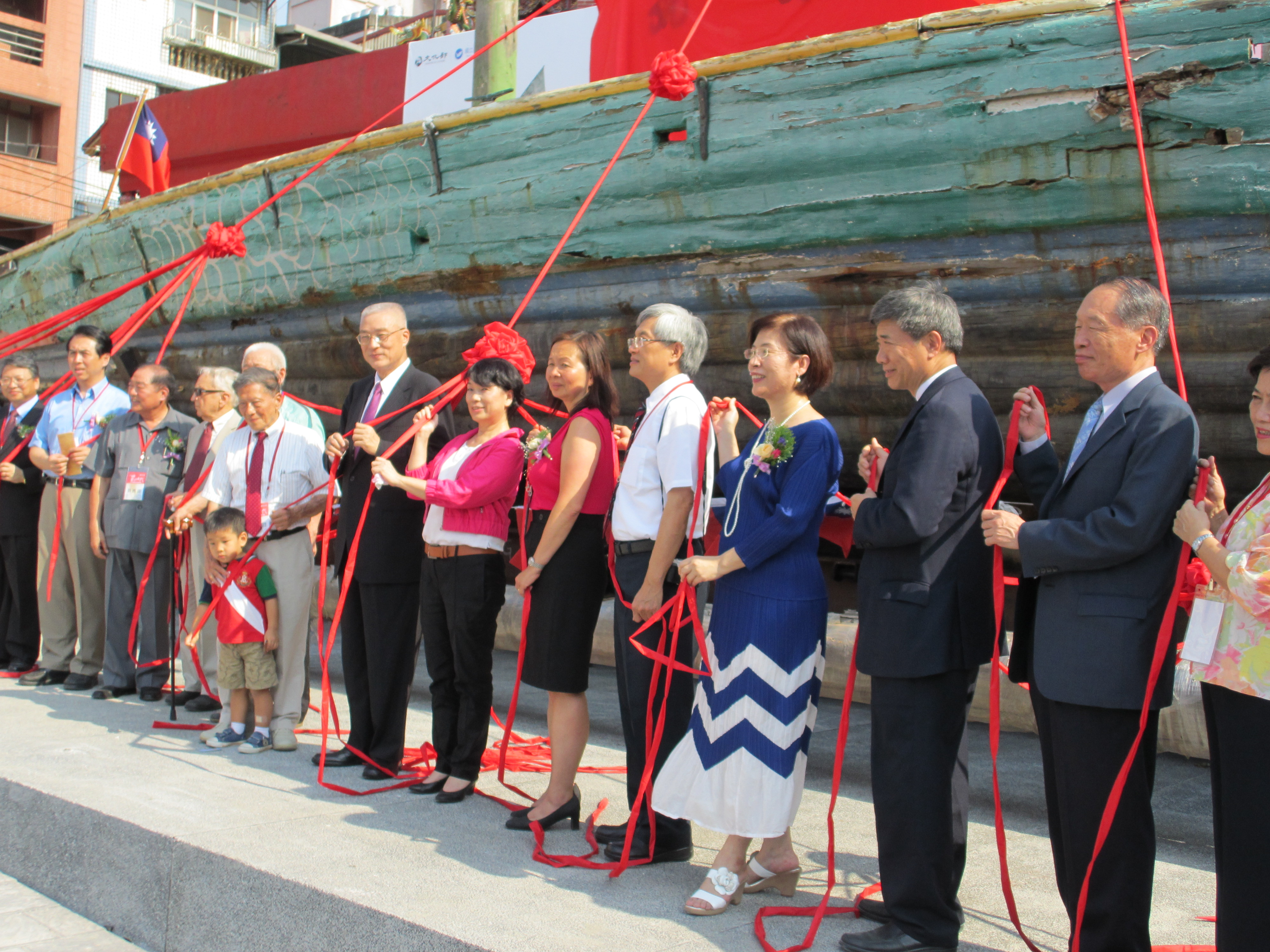
Free China boat homecoming ceremony

As an oceanographer, Chiau has drafted such marine blueprints as the "Vision of Maritime Countries" in 1996, the "Maritime Affairs Organization Prospectus" in 2000, the "Ocean White Paper" in 2001, the "National Vision for the Golden Decade" concerning the ocean and wetlands protection policy in 2002, the "Ocean Policy White Paper" in 2006, the "Ocean Education White Paper" in 2007, and the "Blue Revolution and Ocean Nation" policy in 2008. Chiau and Huang Huang-hsiung hosted the "Ocean and Taiwan Seminar" three consecutive times. Chiau also participated in rescuing the Free China Junk.

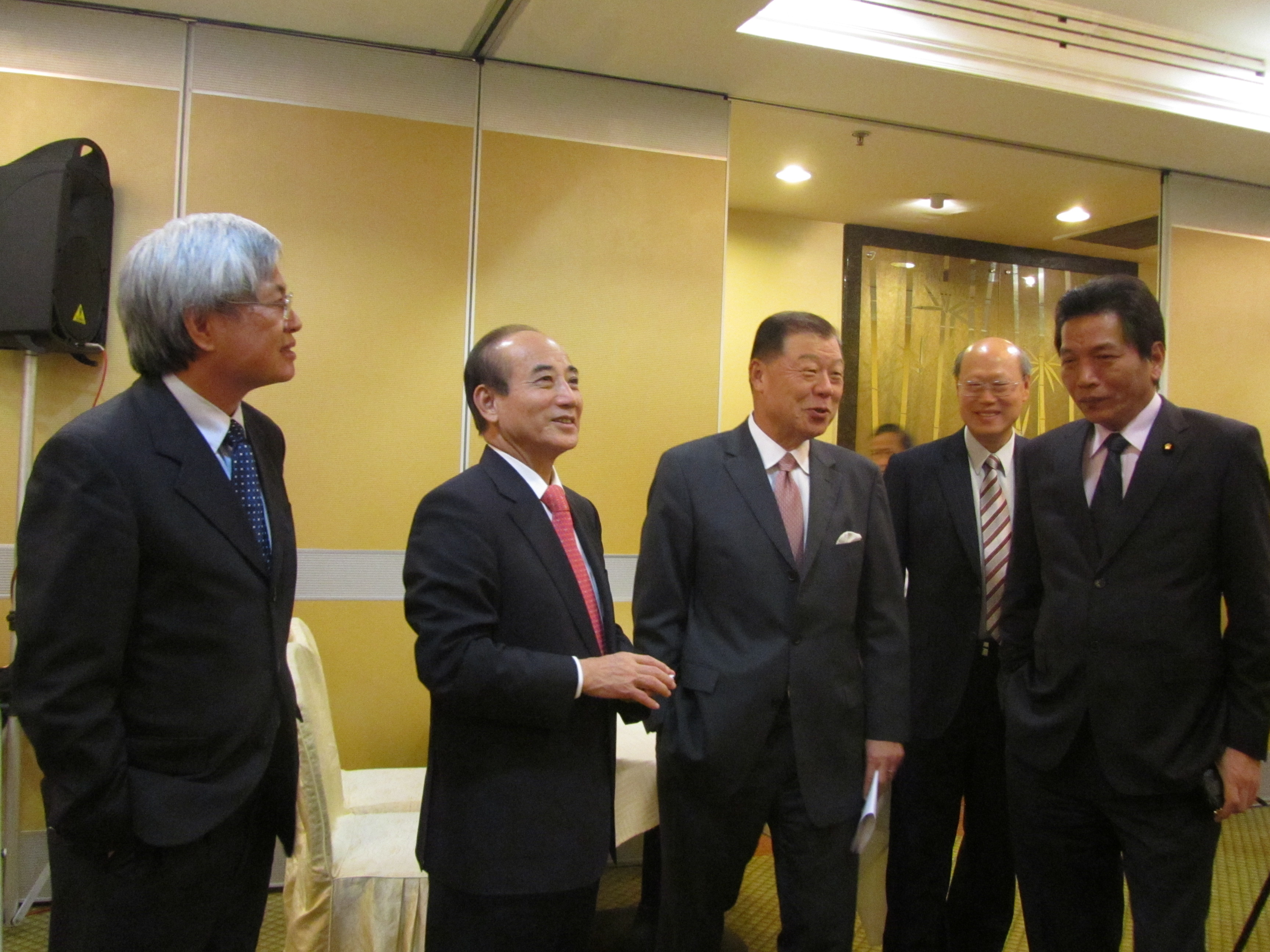
Chiau in 2012 with other diplomats

Chiau was appointed the deputy director of the Environmental Protection Administration, Executive Yuan in August 2008. In 2011, he was nominated and ranked fifth by the Kuomintang Party as the 2012 legislator-at-large in November 2011. Furthermore, Chiau was appointed as the President of "R.O.C. Parliamentary Association for Friendship with Germany" established in the Legislative Yuan on June 10, 2015.

Chiau advocates environmental sustainability and landscape and cultural heritage preservation and has also urged developing electronic maritime charts to maintain navigation safety. Meanwhile, he advocates relevant countries to be self-restrained regarding disputes over the East China Sea and South China Sea. He recommends upholding the concept of "peace" and "marine protected zones" so that Taiwan, China and Japan can temporarily put their dispute aside and negotiate with the "International Marine Peace Park" that is constructed jointly in the East China Sea and the South China Sea.

== Work History ==
Academia
Chiau previously served as a professor and the director of the Institute of Marine Affairs and Resource Management, National Taiwan Ocean University. He is currently an associate professor in the Department of Marine Environment and Engineering at National Sun Yat-sen University.

Government
Chiau's participation in the Taiwanese government has consisted of the following posts: 8th term of legislator-at-large, Deputy Minister of Environmental Protection Administration, Member, Commission on Marine Education, Ministry of Education Council Member, National Council for Marine Affairs Advancement, Executive Yuan Cabinet) Member, Commission on Research and Planning, Taiwan Coast Guard Administration, Executive Yuan (Cabinet) Advisor, Advisory Commission on National Land Conservation and Development of the Presidential Hall Council Member, National Council for Sustainable Development, Executive Yuan (Cabinet) Advisor, Committee for Sustainable Development, Legislative Yuan (Congress) Member, Committee on Environmental Impact Assessment, Penghu County Government Advisor, Kaohsiung County Government Advisor, Kaohsiung City Government Advisor, Pingtung County Government Member, Advisory Commission on Wildlife Conservation, Council of Agriculture, Executive Yuan (Cabinet) Delegate of Chinese Taipei, APEC Marine Resource Conservation Working Group Senior Specialist, Construction and Planning Administration, Ministry of the Interior.

NGOs
He is also involved in non-governmental organizations (NGOs) in the following capacities: CEO, Foundation of Ocean Taiwan President, Taiwan Association of Marine Pollution Control President, Wetlands Taiwan Board Member, Asia Environmental Council – Asia-Pacific NGOs Environmental.

== See also ==
- "Wen-Yan CHIAU Ph.D., Professor, Institute of Marine Affairs and Resources Management, National Taiwan Ocean University". Archived from the original on 2017-04-07.
- "The Legislative Yuan Republic of China-Chiau, Wen-Yan-Brief Introduction". 23 July 2013.
- List of Legislative Yuan members elected in the Republic of China legislative election, 2012
