= Wu-Ling Senior High School =

Coordinates: 24.9875°N 121.2859°E

Taoyuan Municipal Wu-Ling Senior High School
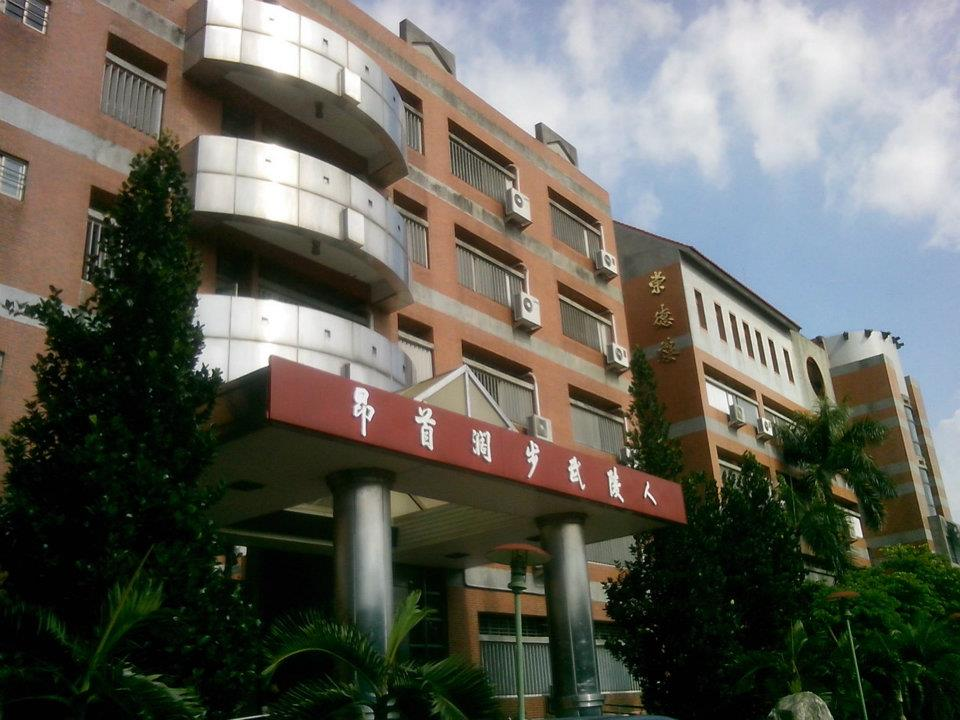

Location
- No. 889, Zhongshan Rd, Taoyuan District, Taoyuan City, 330

Information
- Type: Municipal High School
- Established: 1955
- School district: Taoyuan District, Taoyuan City, Taiwan
- Principal: 林煥周
- Staff: 24
- Faculty: 209
- Grades: 3 grades，63 classes
- Enrollment: 2,733（September 2012）
- Colors: Yellow and Green
- Area: 49250 square metres
- Website: https://www.wlsh.tyc.edu.tw

The Taoyuan Municipal Wu-Ling Senior High School (the hyphen is usually omitted, Chinese: 桃園市立武陵高級中學; pinyin: táo yuán shì lì wǔ líng gāo jí zhōng xué, abbreviation: WLSH) is a secondary school in Taoyuan City, Taiwan, providing education ranging from 9th to 12th grade. The school was founded in 1955 as a program for high schools in the Taipei city to evacuate to in case of possible wars and airstrikes. Given the dramatic sub urbanization and increases in both population and economical power of Taoyuan, the school has thus gained its independence in 1959.

Wuling is the high school with the highest entrance score in Taoyuan since 1959. Nation-wise, Wuling is the 6th most common Alma mater for National Taiwan University freshmen in 2017. In general, a large portion of graduates go on to attend universities both national and worldwide every year.

National Wu-ling Senior high school has held a student yearly exchange programme with Ozenne High School, Toulouse, France since 2009.

== History ==
The school was in February 1955 as a part of the evacuation plan for major high schools in Taipei, in response to the possible strikes during the Second Taiwan Strait Crisis. The school, at that time which was named after the Chiedung River nearby, was founded to be a rural campus of Cheng Kung High School. In 1959, the school went independent and renamed Provincial Wu-Ling High School; the name Wuling was a tribute to the Chinese writer Tao Yuanming's famous essay The Peach Blossom Spring, according to school historian's' research. In the 1970 Extension of Mandatory Education and the separation of senior and junior high schools, the junior high school department (grade 7 to 9) was cancelled, the remaining 9-12 grades renamed Provincial Wu-Ling Senior High School.

As Taoyuan had promoted to a municipal city in 2015, the school was renamed Municipal Wu-Ling Senior High School in 2018.accordingly.

== School Life ==
Following the convention of all Taiwanese senior high schools and the 2012 Reformation, Wuling enrolls its student through multiple standardized tests. For most students, the only way in to the school is through the CAP test, holding around late May each year. For students with special gifts in science, mathematics, the Science Class has its own entrance test every March or April. And for musical talented kids, the entrance test for Musial Talented class, standardized for schools in northern Taiwan, is hosted in April or May each year. Other kinds of entrance exams, like Tezhao (Chinese: 特色招生), had been around in 2012 but since then never hosted again.

Students in Wuling usually start school in 7:30 and end school at 5 o'clock. The period between 7:30 and 8:30 is called Zhaozhixi (早自習), students are expected to arrive the school at 7:30 and studying or self-learning until 8:00. Although technically, there is no punishment for not arriving at the zhaozhixi and rate of "tardy" has always been significant. The period between 4 and 5 pm is named Fudaoke (輔導課), or the "helping programs." Ideally, the helping program is limited to the students who are behind his/her classmates, and by law no new lectures should be taught. most students choose to take it for more and better academic performances, also hoping not to fall behind when lectures are illegally given in such periods. Foreign exchanges students are exempted from attending Zahozhixi and Fudaoke.

Students are only free to take courses at their free wills at a certain (in other words, not very much) extents. Conveniently, the students are sorted into "classes," pupils in the same class take every single course together and have a set, uniformed schedule. There are 21 classes in every grade, about 30 to 50 students in each of them, classes with students less than 30 are rare but possible. In Wuling, similar to that of France, classes are further sorted into 3 streams (類組) with different educational focuses in grade 11 and 12. It is interesting that although the legal tender of the streams was demolished by the Ministry of Education in 2002, in the eyes of encouraging school to adopt the free-at-will course selecting system in the US, Wuling still practices it. The educational experiment of free course taking systems was eventually set off in 2016, under the name of Xuanxio (選修). As of 2018, Xuanxio only makes up 2 lecture hours every week, comparing to the 40 total classing hours.

For most people, the classes in which they are placed, are decided by a computer random number generator. For the selected minorities, they can choose the class themselves after qualifying yet another series of standardized tests, either the national-level tests mentioned before, or by the school-wide "Gifted Student Qualification Tests," or sometimes, by the GPA of their academic performance.

Students are expected to buy the uniforms (around NTD 4000) when entering the school and have neat uniforms on them when entering the campus. The dressing codes are constantly debated regarding this topic, both between the school governing body and students, and between the school and the society in general. As for Feb 2018, there is no punishments for not buying or wearing uniforms whatsoever, both by the law and by the school internal dressing code.

== Special Education ==
Wuling has a renowned reputation for high testing scores throughout the nation. Currently, Wuling has the city's largest special education enrolling population. These are the special education programs that are offered in the school, ranked by founding date.

=== Mathematical and Scientific Talented Class ===
The Mathematical and Scientific Talented Class (數理資優班), was started as the first special education program in 1988; the homerooms of STEM class is 101, 201 and 301. STEM is a class that offers advanced Mathematics, Chemistry, Physics and Biology placement.

=== Musical Talented Class ===
The MTC was founded in 1991. The homerooms of the MTCs are 121, 221 and 321, all of which are in the Meiyu Building. Pupils in the MTCs could take courses such as Chorus, Acoustics, Orchestra and Music Theory.

=== Language Gifted Classes ===
The LGC was founded in 2004. The homerooms of the LGCs are 120, 220, 320. Pupils of LGC could take a second foreign language courses, French or Japanese or Korean or Spanish.

=== Science Class ===
The Science class is a programme for talented students directly sponsored by the Ministry of Education, pupils in the Science Class will complete the three-year high school curriculum in just two years. At the end of the eleventh grade, pupils will take an examination which decides if they could take courses in National Central University. The homerooms of the Science Classes are 103, 203 and 303.

== Uniforms ==
=== Formal Uniform ===
- Male：
  - Summer: Yellow short-sleeved shirt and olive green trousers.
  - Winter: Yellow long-sleeved shirt and olive green trousers.
- Female：
  - Summer: Kiwi green short-sleeved blouse and olive green short pleated skirt。
  - Winter: Kiwi green long-sleeved blouse and olive green trousers.

The formal uniforms are nicknamed as "Kiwi fruits" because of their iconic colour. There is also a Kiwi Festival hosted every April Fools' Day by the EPOCH.

=== Sportswear Uniform ===
- Summer: Yellow short-sleeved T-shirt, blue-yellow fluorescent trousers.
- Winter: Yellow long-sleeved sweater, blue-yellow fluorescent trousers and jacket.

The sportswear uniform does not differentiated by sexes, as a showing of support to non-binary sexes and LGBT groups. The front side of T-shirts and sweaters features the name "Wuling" in traditional Chinese calligraphy. The winter jacket features the name "Wuling" in English in the back.

=== School Bag ===
Although the school authority urges the students to carry a school bag, most students uses their own bag. The school bag is dark green oblique horizontal sticky bag, can be store as large as a B4 size printed document, size 35 × 23 × 9 cm. The front school bag features a yellow "Wuling" in Chinese at the front, and the school badge in between the Chinese characters.

== Floor Plans ==
There are 11 major buildings in WLHS. There is no dormitory nor swimming pools in WLHS, which is very different from the rest of the high school in Taoyuan.

=== Yu-jing Building ===
Sitting in the left to the school gate, the Yu-jing Building is a 6-storey building (including an underground parking space for faculty). From the first (ground) to the third floor sits the principal's office, academic affairs office, military instructor's office, academic affairs office, meeting room and the Teachers' Union office. In the fourth and the fifth floor sits the homerooms, most of them belonging to 12-graders.

=== Chong-de Building ===
Chong-de building is a rather-new building in the Wuling High School, it is located in the back of the Yu-jing building. Just like the Yu-jing, Chong-de building is also made up by 5+1 floors. On the fifth floor above ground sits the Ji-ching Hall and Classroom for Indigenous Taiwanese Cultures.

=== Ji-qing Hall and Classroom for Indigenous Taiwanese Cultures ===
The word Ji-qing means "to play Biangqing" in Chinese. Traditionally, the musical instrument Biangqing is used in China's ritual and court ceremonies. Ji-ching Hall is the classroom for traditional Chinese and traditional Chinese musics. The Classroom for Indigenous Taiwanese Cultures was completed in 2016, it is the classroom of which pupils could learn about the various kinds of Taiwanese indigenous people. Both of the two classrooms are located in the 5th floor of Chong-de and Yu-jing.

=== The Grand Mirror ===
The Grand Mirror is located between homeroom 105 and 106, in Chong-de building. The mirrors serve an important role in Chinese traditional spiritual believings; according to a widespread myth, the Grand Mirror is calm down the spirits of whom committed suicide in Wuling.

=== Science Building ===
The classrooms which located in the Science building are the Earth Science Laboratory, Chemistry Laboratory, Physics Laboratory, Group Research Project Laboratory (for STEM class students, will finish construction in 2016) and an Audio-Visual classroom.

=== Mei-yu Building ===
The classrooms which located in the Science building are the Art Classroom, Technology Classroom, Health Classroom, Home Economics Classroom, Audio-Visual classroom, Piano Room for MTC, Cooking Classroom, Concert Hall, a Meeting Room and the homerooms of 121, 221, 321.

=== Tsu-qing Building ===
The Tsu-qing building is covered in yellow mosaics. In the first floor sits the School Store, Resource Classroom for Talented Students and Counselor's Office. In the second floor sits the homerooms of STEM classes (301, 201, 101) and LTCs (120, 220, 320). In the underground floor sits the table tennis practice room. The tsu-qing building is one of the oldest buildings in WLHS.

=== Ming-dao Building ===
Located between the Gymnasium and the Student Activity Centre, Ming-dao building contains the homeroom of class 109 to 119.

=== Gong-yi Building ===
A two-storey building in the far side of the school campus. The ground floor is the Computer Science Classroom, the floor above is the Classroom for Gong-yi Classes.

=== Student Activity Centre ===
A badminton court that could also be used as the place of school assembly.

=== Gymnasium ===
Built in 1978, the Gymnasium is the oldest building in Wuling.

=== Library ===
In the back of Chong-de, the Library is a two-story building.

=== K-Centre ===
Also as known as the Guang-shi Hall. The Guang-shi Hall was the oldest building in WLHS which could be tracked back to 1955 when the school was created. In 2014, the Guang-shi Hall suffered a structural damage, after that, the building was reinforced and changed its name to the K-Centre.

== Extra-curricular Activities ==
=== School Varsity Teams ===
The mascots of WLHS varsity teams are kiwi fruits.

==== Football Team ====
The WLHS football team practices Futsal, as a result of the lack of players to play traditional 11-player football.

===== Basketball Team =====
Constituted by the girl and boy basketball team.

===== Volleyball Team =====
Constituted by the girl and boy volleyball team.

===== Baseball Team =====
Started in 2012, the baseball team is the newest varsity team in WLHS.

===== Picket Honor Guard =====
Founded in 2004, consist of picket team doing their daily duty and honor guard performing in grand ceremony.

=== Literature and Arts of Wuling Youths ===
The Literature and Arts of Wuling Youths (武陵青年文藝, or 武青文藝) is the official school publication of Wuling High School. The LAWY is published on the April Fool's Day every year, the contents are mostly poems and other student artworks.

== See also ==
- Education in Taiwan
