= Lee Tung-hao =

Taiwanese economist and politician

Lee Tung-hao MLY
- 李桐豪
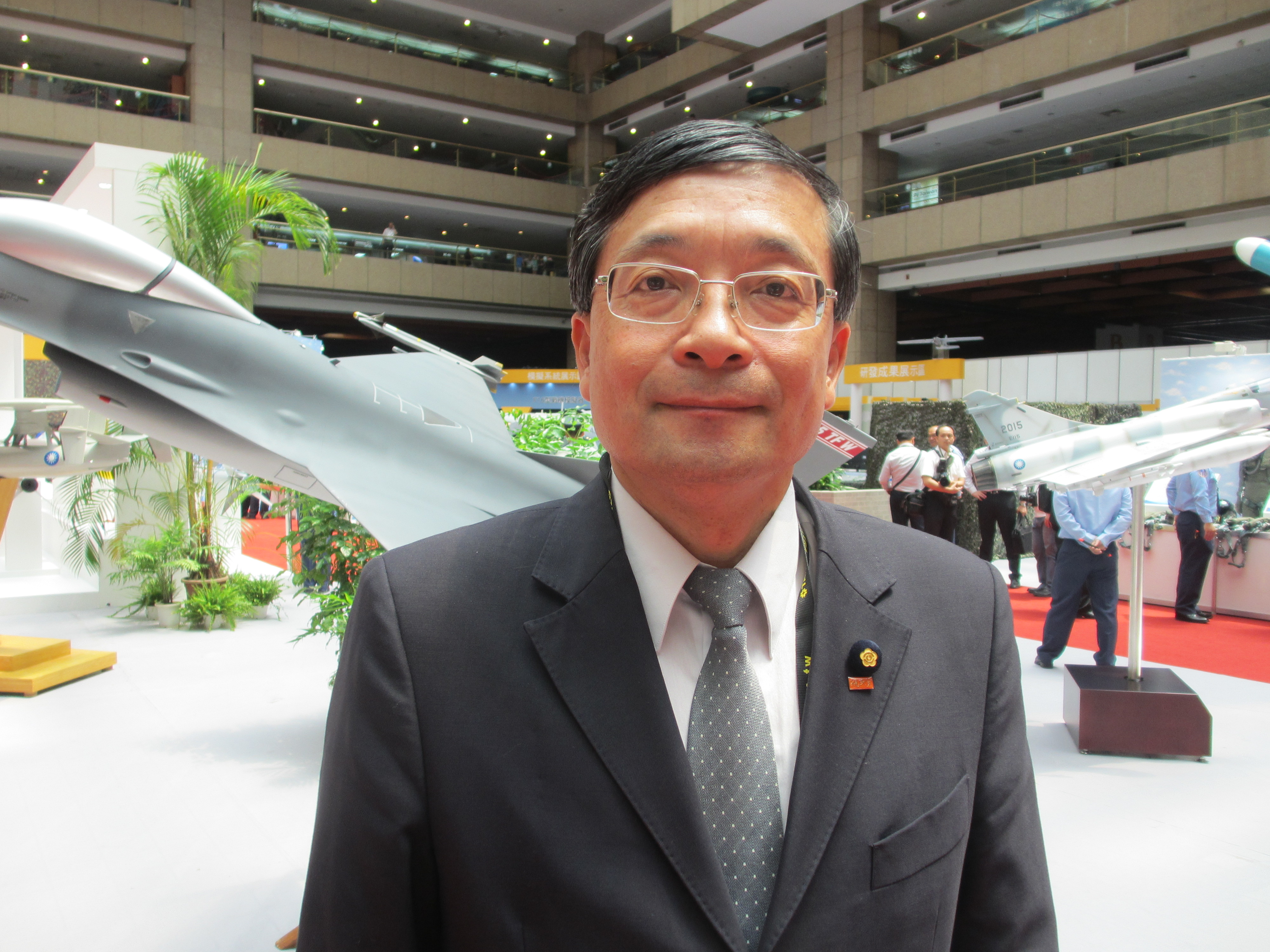
- Lee in August 2015

Member of the Legislative Yuan
- In office 1 February 2012 – 31 January 2016
- Constituency: Republic of China
- In office 1 February 2002 – 31 January 2005
- Constituency: Republic of China

Personal details
- Born: 7 October 1955 (age 70) Taipei County, Taiwan
- Party: People First Party
- Education: National Taiwan University (BA); Ohio State University (PhD)
- Profession: Economist

Lee Tung-hao (Chinese: 李桐豪; born 7 October 1955), also known by his English name Thomas Lee, is a Taiwanese economist and politician. He served as a member of the Legislative Yuan twice, first from 2002 to 2005, and again between 2012 and 2016.

== Education ==
Lee graduated from National Taiwan University with a Bachelor of Arts (B.A.) in economics in 1978, then completed doctoral studies in the United States, where he earned his Ph.D. in economics from Ohio State University in 1986 with a specialization in international economics and econometrics. His doctoral dissertation, supervised by Professor J. Huston McCulloch, was titled, "Optimal public debt policy under uncertainty: a new classical approach".

After receiving his doctorate, Lee taught finance at National Chengchi University.

== Political career ==
Lee was elected to the Legislative Yuan in 2001 via the People First Party proportional representation party list. In 2004, he was named a defendant in two court cases, as Chen Che-nan and Chang Ching-fang separately charged Lee with libel. Later that year, Lee offered to resign his legislative seat, as PFP chairman James Soong attempted to join the body and engage President Chen Shui-bian in debate. After Lee's first term expired, he was nominated by the People First Party to join the National Communications Commission. In 2011, Lee was again placed on the party list ballot as a PFP legislative candidate. During his second legislative term, Lee served as caucus whip for the People First Party. In November 2012, he attended a student-led protest against the monopolization of media in Taiwan. Lee opposed the 2013 passage of the Senior Secondary Education Act and Junior College Act because he believed that the laws did not allocate enough money to the education system. After the 2014 Kaohsiung gas explosions, Lee proposed special statues that would help relief efforts. In 2015, Chen Yi-chieh, Kao Chin Su-mei, Hsu Hsin-ying, and Lee founded a new legislative caucus named the New Alliance.

== Political stances ==
Lee supported the signing of the Economic Cooperation Framework Agreement between China and Taiwan.

He has stated that ractopamine use in beef "is not an urgent issue." After the Codex Alimentarius Commission voted to permit trace amounts of ractopamine in beef, Lee suggested that the government adopt the international standard and propose legislative amendments to allow the United States to export beef to Taiwan.

Lee became known as "the cannon of tax reform" in part due to his support of the capital gains tax.
