= Asia Eastern University of Science and Technology =

University in Banqiao, New Taipei, Taiwan

- 亞東科技大學
- Type: private university
- Established: 1968 (as Oriental Academy of Industrial Technology); 1973 (as Oriental Academy of Industry); 2000 (as Oriental Institute of Technology); 2021 (as Asia Eastern University of Science and Technology)
- Location: Banqiao, New Taipei, Taiwan; 24.9959°N 121.4527°E
- Website: Official website

Asia Eastern University of Science and Technology
- Traditional Chinese: 亞東科技大學
Transcriptions
Standard Mandarin
- Hanyu Pinyin: Yàdōng Jìshù Xuéyuàn
Southern Min
- Hokkien POJ: A-tang Kho-ki Tāi-ha̍k

Asia Eastern University of Science and Technology (OIT; Chinese: 亞東科技大學; Pe̍h-ōe-jī: A-tang Kho-ki Tāi-ha̍k) is a private university in Banqiao District, New Taipei, Taiwan and was originally known as the Far East College of Engineering and Technology. It was later renamed Asia University of Science and Technology in 2001 and then again to its current name, Asia Eastern University of Science and Technology, in 2018.

AEU offers a wide range of undergraduate and graduate programs in fields such as engineering, computer science, business, management, design, and humanities.

== History ==
OIT was founded in 1968 as Oriental Academy of Industrial Technology. In 1973, the academy was renamed Oriental Academy of Industry and consisted of four departments. In 2000, it was restructured to become Oriental Institute of Technology and its two-year college was established. In 2001, it established its four-year college. On 1 August 2021, it was renamed to Asia Eastern University of Science and Technology after approval by the Ministry of Education.

== Faculties ==
- College of Engineering
- College of Healthcare and Management
- College of Information and Communication Science

== Transportation ==
OIT is accessible within walking distance south from Far Eastern Hospital Station of the Taipei Metro.

== See also ==
- List of universities in Taiwan
