= Wang Zhongyu (politician, born 1891) =

Chinese politician

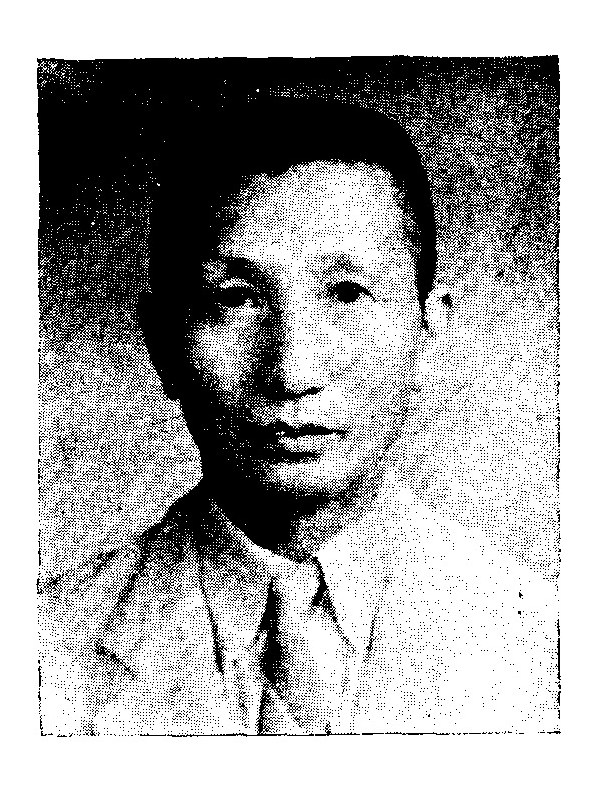

Member of the Legislative Yuan
- In office 1948–1981
- Constituency: Shandong

Personal details
- Born: 1891
- Died: 1981

Wang Zhongyu (Chinese: 王仲裕, 1891 – 1981) was a Chinese politician. An early activist of the Kuomintang, he was a follower Sun Yat-sen and Ding Weifen and a close friend of the Kuomintang veteran Gu Zhenggang. He founded the Sun Wenist League, was a delegate to the Constituent National Assembly and subsequently served in the Legislative Yuan.

== Biography ==
Born Jin Chuo, Wang was originally from Liuguzhuang, Donggang District, Rizhao City, Shandong Province. He attended Beijing China University, Moscow Sun Yat-sen University and Waseda University in Japan. Returning to China, he became a member of the Kuomintang committee in Shandong. He served as Minister of Works for Peking municipality and director of the Transport Burueau in Tianjin.

Having been a delegate to the Constituent National Assembly that drew up the Constitution of the Republic of China, he was elected to the Legislative Yuan in the 1948 elections from Shandong Province. He relocated to Taiwan during the Chinese Civil War, where he remained a member of parliament until his death in 1981.
