= Lin Shih-chia (politician) =

Taiwanese politician

- 林世嘉
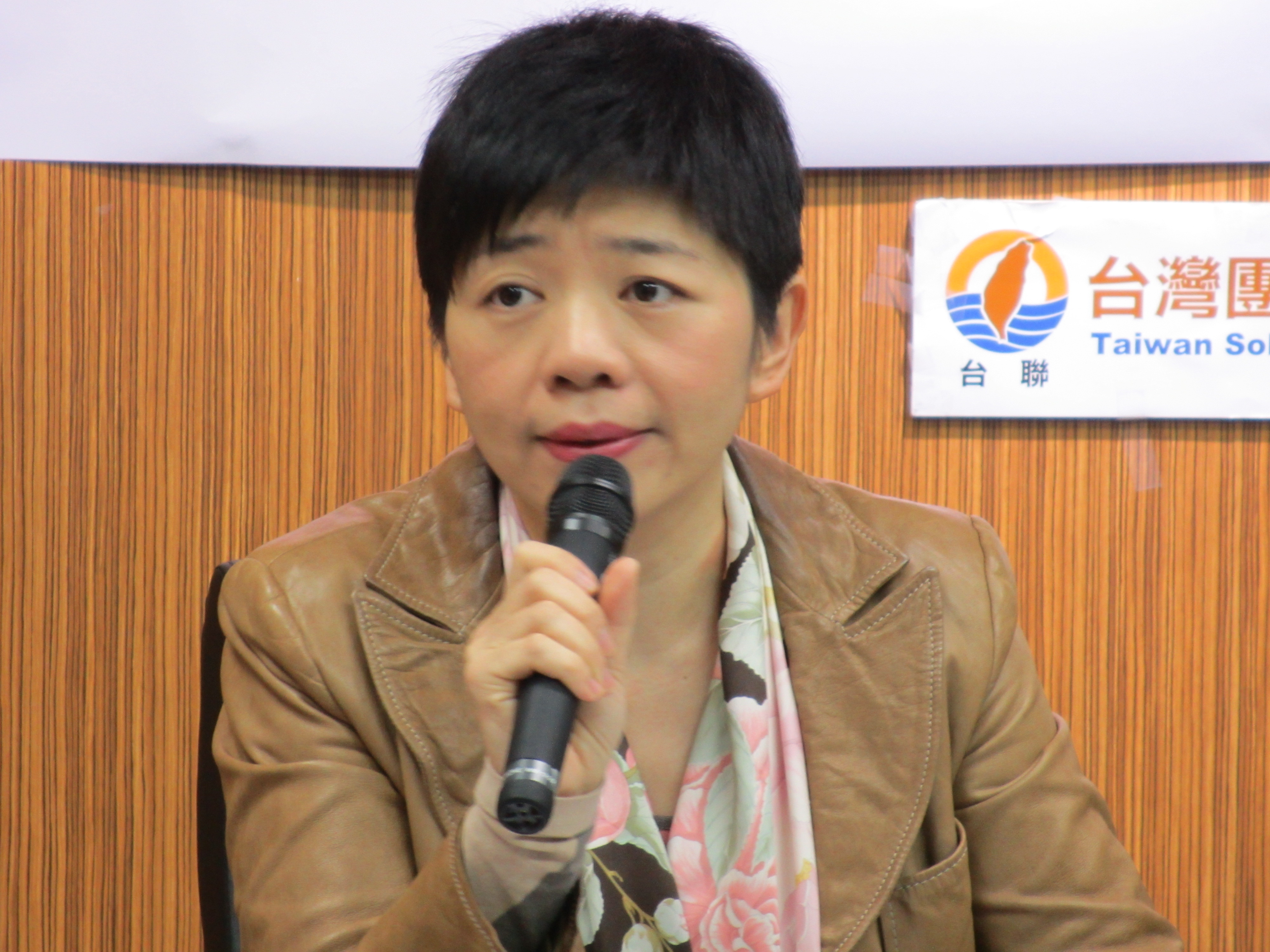
- Lin in 2013

Member of the Legislative Yuan
- In office 1 February 2012 – 15 July 2013
- Succeeded by: Yeh Chin-lin
- Constituency: Republic of China

Personal details
- Born: 15 April 1969 (age 57) Taichung, Taiwan
- Party: Taiwan Solidarity Union (until 2013)
- Education: National Taiwan University (BS); National Yang-Ming University (MS)

Lin Shih-chia (Chinese: 林世嘉; born 15 April 1969) is a Taiwanese politician. She was elected to the Legislative Yuan in 2012, and served until July 2013, when she was expelled from the Taiwan Solidarity Union.

== Education and non-political career ==
Lin graduated from National Taiwan University with a bachelor's degree in public health and earned a master's degree in public health from National Yang-Ming University. Prior to her election to the Legislative Yuan, she was active in the Medical Professionals Alliance. After leaving the legislature, Lin led the Peng Wan-ju Foundation. In her return to the Medical Professionals Alliance, Lin took an active role in advocating for Taiwan's increased participation in the World Health Assembly. Lin's editorials on the topic have appeared in the Taipei Times.

== Political career ==
Lin was elected as an at-large legislator representing the Taiwan Solidarity Union in January 2012. She was expelled from the party in July 2013 for her support of an amendment to the Accounting Act, losing her legislative seat to Yeh Chin-ling in August. Prior to her expulsion from the legislature, Lin served as TSU caucus whip.

As a lawmaker, Lin repeatedly denounced Chinese influence on Taiwan and elsewhere, stating that Taiwan should share the ideals of democracy and liberty with the mainland. In a March 2012 National Affairs Forum meeting, she remarked "Are we at the National or Area Affairs Forum?" indirectly criticizing the one country, two systems framework. In May of that year, Lin attended a meeting of the World Health Assembly wearing a shirt that read "Taiwan is Taiwan, not China." She was then asked to leave the assembly. Lin opposed the Economic Cooperation Framework Agreement, signed in 2010, and the Cross-Strait Service Trade Agreement of 2013.

Lin objected to the use of ractopamine in beef, and engaged in discussions and protests about the additive's use in United States beef imports to Taiwan. She proposed a related amendment granting the legislature the right to review safety levels for pesticide and drug residue in food. After the Codex Alimentarius Commission revised standards for ractopamine use, Lin advised against loosening Taiwanese regulations. After a case of bovine spongiform encephalopathy surfaced in the United States in April 2012, Lin proposed a ban on American beef imports in Taiwan.

During her legislative tenure, Lin maintained an interest in nuclear energy, the environment, and medical care. She made multiple attempts at legislative reform, proposing amendments to increase the influence of smaller political parties and women.
