= Wang Chung-yu =

Taiwanese politician

Wang Chung-yu MLY
- 王鍾渝

Member of the Legislative Yuan
- In office 1 February 2002 – 31 January 2005
- Constituency: Republic of China

Personal details
- Born: 1 April 1945 (age 81)
- Party: Kuomintang
- Education: Chung Yuan Christian University (BS)

Wang Chung-yu (Chinese: 王鍾渝; born 1 April 1945) is a Taiwanese politician. He was trained as a chemical engineer and worked for China Steel before serving on the fifth Legislative Yuan between 2002 and 2005.

== Career ==
Wang studied chemical engineering at Chung Yuan Christian University. He accrued two decades experience within the steel industry, rising to become the president and later chairman of China Steel. During Wang's tenure as chairman, China Steel earned NT$23 billion. In February 2000, Wang announced that China Steel had launched an e-commerce company as joint venture with FarEasTone. He was considered for reappointment in May 2001, though the Ministry of Economic Affairs chose to designate Kuo Yen-tu as chairman. His departure from China Steel was thought to be for political reasons; similar sentiments were stated of Wang's successors in the post. After leaving China Steel, Wang remained in leadership positions in several business organizations, among them the ROC-USA Business Council, the Taiwan Steel & Iron Industrial Association, and the Association of Industry for Environmental Protection ROC. He also served as founding chairman of the Kaohsiung Rapid Transit Corporation, within which China Steel worked to help construct the Kaohsiung Rapid Transit system.

Wang was known for his support of nuclear power, and had questioned the viability of potential alternatives. Wang backed the Pan-Blue Coalition's joint presidential ticket in the 2000 election. He was placed on the Kuomintang party list for the 2001 legislative election, and was seated in the Legislative Yuan. While a member of the legislature, Wang continued serving as president of the Taiwan-USA Business Council, Taiwan Steel & Iron Industries Association, and deputy chairman of the Chinese International Economic Cooperation Association. The People First Party considered nominating Wang as a candidate for the Kaohsiung mayoralty in 2002, but he did not run. However, he was active in persuading other Pan-Blue candidates to run for local office. As a legislator, Wang took an interest in government debt, especially that of state-owned enterprises. In January 2003, Wang proposed that opposition parties should form a shadow government. In November 2005, months after his legislature term had ended, the Kuomintang nominated him to sit on the National Communications Commission.

Instead, Wang returned to business and industry. Though he had assumed the chairmanship of Tong Lung Metal Industry in 2002, Wang did not consider a restructuring of the company complete until March 2006, a year after he stepped down from the Legislative Yuan. Still deputy chairman of the Chinese International Economic Cooperation Association through 2008, Wang was named chairman of the non-profit organization by 2010. As chairman of the CIECA, Wang traveled to Latin America, India, Malaysia, and Myanmar.
