= Legislative Yuan constituencies =

Legislature seats in the Republic of China (Taiwan)

The Legislative Yuan is the unicameral legislature of the Republic of China (Taiwan), currently with 113 seats, down from the previous 225 in 1998.

73 are directly elected in local single-member districts by the citizens residing in the free area of the Republic of China. 6 seats are elected by indigenous peoples voters in two three-member constituencies. 34 are elected on nationwide party-list.

== List of single-member constituencies ==
Constituency	Area	Last change of area	Electorate (Note: 2020 election; based on area rather than constituency name)	Current member
Taipei City Constituency 1	Beitou, Shilin (13 villages)	2007	275,438	Rosalia Wu (DPP)
Taipei City Constituency 2	Datong, Shilin (38 villages)	2007	265,434	Ho Chih-wei (DPP)
Taipei City Constituency 3	Zhongshan, Songshan (20 villages)	2007	288,875	Wang Hung-wei (KMT)
Taipei City Constituency 4	Neihu, Nangang	2007	324,765	Kao Chia-yu (DPP)
Taipei City Constituency 5	Wanhua, Zhongzheng (21 villages)	2007	244,748	Freddy Lim (independent)
Taipei City Constituency 6	Daan	2007	243,908	Vacant
Taipei City Constituency 7	Xinyi, Songshan (7 villages)	2007	244,536	Fai Hrong-tai (KMT)
Taipei City Constituency 8	Wenshan, Zhongzheng (10 villages)	2007	254,363	Lai Shyh-bao (KMT)
New Taipei City Constituency 1 (Note: New Taipei City was Taipei County prior to 2010 and its constituencies were named accordingly.)	Shimen, Sanzhi, Tamsui, Bali, Linkou, Taishan	2007	355,104	Hung Mong-kai (KMT)
New Taipei City Constituency 2	Wugu, Luzhou, Sanchong (16 villages)	2007	288,592	Lin Shu-fen (DPP)
New Taipei City Constituency 3	Sanchong (103 villages)	2007	262,709	Yu Tian (DPP)
New Taipei City Constituency 4	Xinzhuang (75 villages)	2007	293,428	Wu Ping-jui (DPP)
New Taipei City Constituency 5	Shulin, Yingge, Xinzhuang (9 villages)	2007	251,452	Su Chiao-hui (DPP)
New Taipei City Constituency 6	West Banqiao (65 villages)	2007	216,250	Chang Hung-lu (DPP)
New Taipei City Constituency 7	East Banqiao (61 villages)	2007	233,095	Lo Chih-cheng (DPP)
New Taipei City Constituency 8	Zhonghe (76 villages)	2007	285,606	Chiang Yung-chang (DPP)
New Taipei City Constituency 9	Yonghe, Zhonghe (17 villages)	2007	241,303	Lin Te-fu (KMT)
New Taipei City Constituency 10	Tucheng, Sanxia	2007	282,441	Wu Chi-ming (DPP)
New Taipei City Constituency 11	Xindian, Shenkeng, Shiding, Pinglin, Wulai	2007	291,485	Lo Ming-tsai (KMT)
New Taipei City Constituency 12	Xizhi, Jinshan, Wanli, Ruifang, Pingxi, Shuangxi, Gongliao	2007	259,761	Lai Pin-yu (DPP)
Taoyuan City Constituency 1 (Note: Taoyuan City was Taoyuan County prior to 2014 and its constituencies were named accordingly.)	Luzhu, Guishan, Taoyuan (11 villages)	2007	311,150	Cheng Yun-peng (DPP)
Taoyuan City Constituency 2	Yangmei, Xinwu, Guanyin, Dayuan	2007	296,132	Huang Shier-Chieh (DPP)
Taoyuan City Constituency 3	Zhongli (73 villages)	2007	283,912	Lu Ming Che (KMT)
Taoyuan City Constituency 4	Taoyuan (65 villages)	2007	284,490	Wan Mei-ling (KMT)
Taoyuan City Constituency 5	Pingzhen, Longtan	2007	271,396	Lu Yu-ling (KMT)
Taoyuan City Constituency 6	Bade, Daxi, Fuxing, Zhongli (12 villages)	2007	270,879	Chao Cheng-yu (independent)
Taichung City Constituency 1	Dajia, Daan, Waipu, Qingshui, Wuqi	2007	218,024	Tsai Chi-chang (DPP)
Taichung City Constituency 2 (Note: Also included two villages of Dali prior to 2019)	Shalu, Longjing, Dadu, Wuri, Wufeng	2019	291,122	Lin Ching-yi (DPP)
Taichung City Constituency 3	Houli, Shengang, Daya, Tanzi	2007	255,442	Yang Chiung-ying (KMT)
Taichung City Constituency 4 (Note: Formerly Taichung City Constituency 1 prior to 2010)	Xitun, Nantun	2007	310,726	Chang Liao Wan-chien (DPP)
Taichung City Constituency 5 (Note: Formerly Taichung City Constituency 2 prior to 2010)	Beitun, North	2007	343,364	Zhuang Ching-cheng (DPP)
Taichung City Constituency 6 (Note: Formerly Taichung City Constituency 3 prior to 2010)	South, East, Central, West	2007	268,406	Huang Kuo-shu (independent)
Taichung City Constituency 7 (Note: Formerly Taichung County Constituency 4 prior to 2010)	Taiping, Dali (Note: Two districts in Taichung Constituency 2 prior to 2019)	2019	319,162	Ho Hsin-chun (DPP)
Taichung City Constituency 8 (Note: Formerly Taichung County Constituency 5 prior to 2010)	Fengyuan, Shigang, Dongshi, Xinshe, Heping	2007	211,362	Johnny Chiang (KMT)
Tainan City Constituency 1	Houbi, Baihe, Beimen, Syuejia, Yanshuei, Xinying, Liouying, Dongshan, Jiangjun, Xiaying, Liujia	2019	250,801	Lai Huei-yuen (DPP)
Tainan City Constituency 2	Cigu, Jiali, Madou, Guantian, Shanhua, Danei, Yujing, Nansi, Sigang, Anding, Shanshang, Zuojhen, Nanhua	2019	254,746	Kuo Kuo-wen (DPP)
Tainan City Constituency 3	Annan, North	2019	263,159	Chen Ting-fei (DPP)
Tainan City Constituency 4	Sinshih, Yongkang, Sinhua	2019	254,823	Lin I-chin (DPP)
Tainan City Constituency 5	Anping, South, West Central, East (16 villages)	2019	265,703	Lin Jun-xian (DPP)
Tainan City Constituency 6	Rende, Gueiren, Guanmiao, Longci, East (29 villages)	2019	256,866	Wang Ding-yu (DPP)
Kaohsiung City Constituency 1 (Note: Formerly Kaohsiung County Constituency 1 prior to 2010)	Taoyuan, Namasia, Jiasian, Liouguei, Shanlin, Neimen, Cishan, Meinong, Maolin, Alian, Tianliao, Yanchao, Dashu, Dashe	2007	222,799	Chiu Yi-ying (DPP)
Kaohsiung City Constituency 2 (Note: Formerly Kaohsiung County Constituency 2 prior to 2010)	Qieding, Hunei, Lujhu, Yongan, Gangshan, Mituo, Ziguan, Ciaotou	2007	260,269	Chiu Chih-wei (DPP)
Kaohsiung City Constituency 3 (Note: Formerly Kaohsiung City Constituency 1 prior to 2010)	Zuoying, Nanzih	2007	304,481	Liu Shyh-fang (DPP)
Kaohsiung City Constituency 4 (Note: Formerly Kaohsiung County Constituency 3 prior to 2010)	Renwu, Niaosong, Daliao, Linyuan	2007	261,093	Lin Tai-hua (DPP)
Kaohsiung City Constituency 5	Sanmin, Lingya (5 villages)	2019	303,844	Lee Kun-tse (DPP)
Kaohsiung City Constituency 6	Gushan, Yancheng, Cianjin, Sinsing, Lingya (61 villages)	2019	317,268	Chao Tien-lin (DPP)
Kaohsiung City Constituency 7 (Note: Formerly Kaohsiung City Constituency 8 2010–2019 and Kaohsiung County Constituency 4 prior to 2010)	Fongshan	2007	290,775	Hsu Chih-chieh (DPP)
Kaohsiung City Constituency 8	Siaogang, Cianjhen, Cijin	2019	305,923	Lai Jui-lung (DPP)
Yilan County Constituency	Yilan	2007	362,603	Chen Ou-po (DPP)
Hsinchu County Constituency 1	Xinfeng, Hukou, Xinpu, Qionglin, Guanxi, Jianshi, Zhubei (12 villages)	2019	205,119	Lin Wei-chou (KMT)
Hsinchu County Constituency 2	Zhudong, Hengshan, Baoshan, Beipu, Emei, Wufeng, Zhubei (19 villages)	2019	215,236	Lin Si-ming (KMT)
Miaoli County Constituency 1	Zhunan, Houlong, Zaoqiao, Tongxiao, Tongluo, Sanyi, Yuanli	2007	206,005	Chen Chao-ming (KMT)
Miaoli County Constituency 2	Toufen City, Sanwan, Nanzhuang, Miaoli City, Touwu, Shitan, Gongguan, Dahu, Tai'an, Zhuolan	2007	231,819	Hsu Chih-jung (KMT)
Changhua County Constituency 1	Shengang, Xianxi, Hemei, Lukang, Fuxing, Xiushui	2007	253,540	Chen Hsiu-bao (DPP)
Changhua County Constituency 2	Huatan, Fenyuan, Changhua	2007	241,162	Huang Hsiu-fang (DPP)
Changhua County Constituency 3	Fangyuan, Erlin, Puyan, Xihu, Puxin, Dacheng, Zhutang, Pitou, Beidou, Xizhou	2007	270,719	Xie Yi-feng (KMT)
Changhua County Constituency 4	Dacun, Yongjing, Shetou, Tianwei, Tianzhong, Ershui, Yuanlin	2007	263,751	Chen Su-yueh (DPP)
Nantou County Constituency 1	Puli, Caotun, Zhongliao, Yuchi, Guoxing, Ren'ai	2007	188,443	Ma Wen-chun (KMT)
Nantou County Constituency 2	Nantou City, Mingjian, Jiji, Zhushan, Lugu, Shuili, Xinyi	2007	202,828	Frida Tsai (DPP)
Yunlin County Constituency 1	Mailiao, Taixi, Dongshi, Baozhong, Tuku, Huwei, Sihu, Yuanchang, Kouhu, Shuilin, Beigang	2007	278,458	Su Chin-feng (DPP)
Yunlin County Constituency 2	Lunbei, Erlun, Xiluo, Cihtong, Linnei, Dapi, Dounan, Gukeng, Douliu	2007	283,554	Liu Chien-kuo (DPP)
Chiayi County Constituency 1	Lioujiao, Dongshi, Puzi, Budai, Yizhu, Lucao, Shuishang, Taibao	2007	199,857	Tsai Yi-yu (DPP)
Chiayi County Constituency 2	Xikou, Dalin, Meishan, Xingang, Chaozhou, Zhuqi, Zhongpu, Fanlu, Alishan, Dapu	2007	222,860	Chen Ming-wen (DPP)
Pingtung County Constituency 1	Ligang, Gaoshu, Sandimen, Wutai, Jiuru, Yanpu, Changzhi, Neipu, Majia, Linluo, Pingtung City	2019	323,633	Chung Chia-pin (DPP)
Pingtung County Constituency 2	Wandan, Taiwu, Zhutian, Wanluan, Chaozhou, Xinyuan, Kanding, Nanzhou, Xinpi, Laiyi, Donggang, Linbian, Jiadong, Fangliao, Chunri, Fangshan, Shizi, Mudan, Checheng, Manzhou, Hengchun, Liuqiu	2019	317,010	Su Chen-ching (independent) (Note: Elected member Su Chen-ching is a member of DPP but ran as an independent)
Taitung County Constituency	Taitung	2007	117,051	Liu Chao-how (DPP)
Hualien County Constituency	Hualien	2007	197,162	Fu Kun-chi (independent)
Penghu County Constituency	Penghu	2007	87,287	Yang Yao (DPP)
Keelung City Constituency	Keelung	2007	303,637	Cai Shi-ying (DPP)
Hsinchu City Constituency	Hsinchu	2007	340,854	Cheng Cheng-chien (KMT)
Chiayi City Constituency	Chiayi	2007	213,240	Wang Mei-hui (DPP)
Kinmen County Constituency	Kinmen	2007	119,092	Chen Yu-chen (KMT)
Lienchiang County Constituency	Matsu	2007	10,583	Cheng Hsueh-sheng (KMT)

== Historical constituencies ==
=== 1948 ===
Prior to the Kuomintang's defeat in Mainland China to the Chinese Communist Party in 1949, there were 759 seats in the Legislative Yuan.

==== Provinces ====
- Andong (Antung): 5 seats
- Anhui (Anhwei): 25 seats
- Chahar: 5 seats
- Fujian (Fukien): 14 seats
- Gansu (Kansu): 8 seats
- Guangdong (Kwangtung): 33 seats
- Guangxi (Kwanghsi): 16 seats
- Guizhou (Kweichow): 12 seats
- Hebei (Hopeh): 31 seats
- Heilongjiang (Heilongkiang): 5 seats
- Hejiang (Hojiang): 5 seats
- Henan (Honan): 36 seats
- Hubei (Hupeh): 28 seats
- Hunan: 33 seats
- Jiangsu (Kiangsu): 38 seats
- Jiangxi (Kiangsi): 22 seats
- Jilin (Kirin): 9 seats
- Liaobei (Liaopei): 5 seats
- Liaoning: 13 seats
- Ningxia (Ninghsia): 5 seats
- Nenjiang (Nunkiang): 5 seats
- Qinghai (Tsinghai): 5 seats
- Rehe (Jehol): 8 seats
- Shaanxi (Shensi): 13 seats
- Shandong (Shantung): 40 seats
- Shanxi (Shansi): 16 seats
- Sichuan (Szechuan): 53 seats
- Sonjiang (Sunkiang): 6 seats
- Suiyuan: 5 seats
- Taiwan: 8 seats
- Xikang (Hsikang): 5 seats
- Xing'an (Hsingan): 5 seats
- Xinjiang (Sinkiang): 6 (5) seats
- Yunnan: 14 seats
- Zhejiang (Chekiang): 23 seats

==== Directly-controlled municipalities ====
- Beiping (Peiping): 5 seats
- Chongqing (Chungking): 5 seats
- Dalian (Dairen): 5 seats – (Soviet-controlled to 1950)
- Guangzhou (Canton): 5 seats
- Hankou (Hankow): 5 seats
- Harbin: 5 seats
- Nanjing (Nanking): 5 seats – National capital
- Qingdao (Tsingtao): 5 seats
- Shanghai: 7 seats
- Shenyang (Mukden): 5 seats
- Tianjin (Tiensin): 5 seats
- Xi'an (Sian): 5 seats

==== Outer Mongolia ====
- Outer Mongolia: 22 seats

==== Tibet ====
- Tibet (Xizang): 5 (3) seats
- Overseas Tibetans: 5 seats
- Provincial Tibetans: 5 seats

==== Ethnic minority representatives ====
- Minorities in frontier regions: 6 seats
- Overseas diaspora: 19 (8) seats

==== Sectoral representatives ====
- Accounting: 1 seat
- Agriculture: 18 seats
- Business: 10 seats
- Education: 10 seats
- Engineering: 2 seats
- Fishery: 3 seats
- Healthcare: 4 seats
- Industrial and Mining: 10 seats
- Journalism: 5 seats
- Legal: 3 seats
- Post-secondary Education: 5 seats
- Workers: 18 seats

=== 1992 ===
Starting from the 1992 legislative election, the second Legislative Yuan had 161 members elected from the Taiwan Area of the Republic of China, 119 from 27 multi-member constituencies, 6 from indigenous constituencies, 6 from overseas constituencies and 30 elected on nationwide party-list.

=== 1995 ===
In 1995, the number of seats from the multi-member constituencies was increased to 122.

=== 1998 ===
In 1998, the number of seats was further increased to 225, 168 from 29 multi-member constituencies, 8 from indigenous constituencies, 8 from overseas constituencies and 41 elected on nationwide party-list.

== See also ==
- Legislative Yuan
- Legislative elections in Taiwan
