= Legislative Yuan constituencies in Kaohsiung City =

Kaohsiung City
- 8 Single-member constituency for the Legislative Yuan
- District(s): Kaohsiung
- Electorate: 2,277,395

Current constituency
- Created: 2008
- Number of members: 8

Kaohsiung City's legislative districts (Chinese: 高雄市選舉區) consist of 8 single-member constituencies, each represented by a member of the Republic of China Legislative Yuan. From the 2020 election onwards, the number of Kaohsiung's seats was decreased from 9 to 8. This mandatory redistricting eliminated Kaohsiung City Constituency 9, and separated the previous Kaohsiung City Constituency 5 into three parts: West Sanmin to the new Kaohsiung City Constituency 5, Gushan and Yancheng to the new Kaohsiung City Constituency 6, and Cijin to the new Kaohsiung City Constituency 8.

== Current districts ==
=== 2020 ===
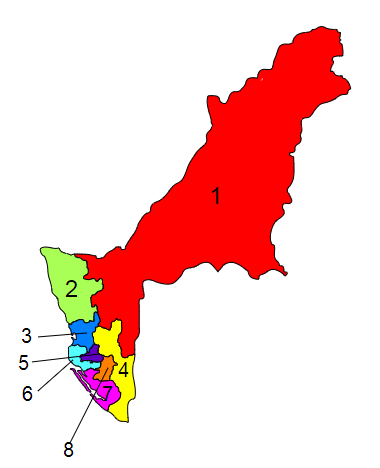
Map of Kaohsiung's legislative districts

- Kaohsiung City Constituency 1 - Taoyuan, Namasia, Jiasian, Liouguei, Shanlin, Neimen, Cishan, Meinong, Maolin, Alian, Tianliao, Yanchao, Dashu, Dashe
- Kaohsiung City Constituency 2 - Qieding, Hunei, Lujhu, Yongan, Gangshan, Mituo, Ziguan, Ciaotou
- Kaohsiung City Constituency 3 - Zuoying, Nanzih
- Kaohsiung City Constituency 4 - Renwu, Niaosong, Daliao, Linyuan
- Kaohsiung City Constituency 5 - Sanmin, parts of Lingya
- Kaohsiung City Constituency 6 - Gushan, Yancheng, Cianjin, Sinsing, Lingya
- Kaohsiung City Constituency 7 - Fongshan
- Kaohsiung City Constituency 8 - Siaogang, Cianjhen, Cijin

== Historical districts ==
=== 2008-2010 ===
- Kaohsiung County Constituency 1 - Taoyuan, Namasia, Jiasian, Liouguei, Shanlin, Neimen, Cishan, Meinong, Maolin, Alian, Tianliao, Yanchao, Dashu, Dashe
- Kaohsiung County Constituency 2 - Qieding, Hunei, Lujhu, Yong'an, Gangshan, Mituo, Ziguan, Ciaotou
- Kaohsiung County Constituency 3 - Renwu, Niaosong, Daliao, Linyuan
- Kaohsiung County Constituency 4 - Fengshan
- Kaohsiung City Constituency 1 - Zuoying, Nanzih
- Kaohsiung City Constituency 2 - Gushan, Yancheng, Cijin, West Sanmin
- Kaohsiung City Constituency 3 - East Sanmin
- Kaohsiung City Constituency 4 - Cianjin, Sinsing, Lingya, parts of Cianjhen
- Kaohsiung City Constituency 5 - Siaogang, Cianjhen

=== 2010-2020 ===
- Kaohsiung City Constituency 1 - Taoyuan, Namasia, Jiasian, Liouguei, Shanlin, Neimen, Cishan, Meinong, Maolin, Alian, Tianliao, Yanchao, Dashu, Dashe
- Kaohsiung City Constituency 2 - Qieding, Hunei, Lujhu, Yong'an, Gangshan, Mituo, Ziguan, Ciaotou
- Kaohsiung City Constituency 3 - Zuoying, Nanzih
- Kaohsiung City Constituency 4 - Renwu, Niaosong, Daliao, Linyuan
- Kaohsiung City Constituency 5 - Gushan, Yancheng, Cijin, West Sanmin
- Kaohsiung City Constituency 6 - East Sanmin
- Kaohsiung City Constituency 7 - Cianjin, Sinsing, Lingya, parts of Cianjhen
- Kaohsiung City Constituency 8 - Fengshan
- Kaohsiung City Constituency 9 - Siaogang, Cianjhen

== Legislators ==
Kuomintang Democratic Progressive Party

Election	Kaohsiung City 1	Kaohsiung City 2	Kaohsiung City 3	Kaohsiung City 4	Kaohsiung City 5	Kaohsiung City 6	Kaohsiung City 7	Kaohsiung City 8	Kaohsiung City 9
2008 7th	Chung Shao-ho; Kaohsiung County Constituency 1 (2008-2010)	Lin Yi-shih; Kaohsiung County Constituency 2 (2008-2010)	Huang Chao-shun; Kaohsiung City Constituency 1 (2008-2010)	Chen Chi-yu; Kaohsiung County Constituency 3 (2008-2010) & (2010-2011)	Kuan Bi-ling; Kaohsiung City Constituency 2 (2008-2010)	Hou Tsai-feng; Kaohsiung City Constituency 3 (2008-2010)	Lee Fu-hsing; Kaohsiung City Constituency 4 (2008-2010)	Chiang Ling-chun; Kaohsiung County Constituency 4 (2008-2010)	Kuo Wen-chen; Kaohsiung City Constituency 5 (2008-2010)
2011 by-election	Chung Shao-ho; Kaohsiung County Constituency 1 (2008-2010)	Lin Yi-shih; Kaohsiung County Constituency 2 (2008-2010)	Huang Chao-shun; Kaohsiung City Constituency 1 (2008-2010)	Lin Tai-hua	Kuan Bi-ling; Kaohsiung City Constituency 2 (2008-2010)	Hou Tsai-feng; Kaohsiung City Constituency 3 (2008-2010)	Lee Fu-hsing; Kaohsiung City Constituency 4 (2008-2010)	Chiang Ling-chun; Kaohsiung County Constituency 4 (2008-2010)	Kuo Wen-chen; Kaohsiung City Constituency 5 (2008-2010)
2012 8th	Chiu Yi-ying	Chiu Chih-wei	Huang Chao-shun; Kaohsiung City Constituency 1 (2008-2010)	Lin Tai-hua	Kuan Bi-ling; Kaohsiung City Constituency 2 (2008-2010)	Lee Kun-tse	Chao Tien-lin	Hsu Chih-chieh	Lin Kuo-cheng
2016 9th	Chiu Yi-ying	Chiu Chih-wei	Liu Shyh-fang	Lin Tai-hua	Kuan Bi-ling; Kaohsiung City Constituency 2 (2008-2010)	Lee Kun-tse	Chao Tien-lin	Hsu Chih-chieh	Lai Jui-lung
Election	Kaohsiung City 1	Kaohsiung City 2	Kaohsiung City 3	Kaohsiung City 4	Kaohsiung City 5	Kaohsiung City 6	Kaohsiung City 7	Kaohsiung City 8	
2020 10th	Chiu Yi-ying	Chiu Chih-wei	Liu Shyh-fang	Lin Tai-hua	Lee Kun-tse	Chao Tien-lin	Hsu Chih-chieh	Lai Jui-lung	
2024 11th	Chiu Yi-ying	Chiu Chih-wei	Lee Po-yi	Lin Tai-hua	Lee Kun-tse	Huang Jie	Hsu Chih-chieh	Lai Jui-lung	

Chen Chi-yu resigned in 2010 to take office as Kaohsiung City vice mayor.
