= 2024 Taiwanese legislative election =

- 13 January 2024

All 113 seats in the Legislative Yuan 57 seats needed for a majority
- Turnout: 71.28% (Note: District and aboriginal electorate; party-list voter turnout was 71.78%) (▼3.65pp)
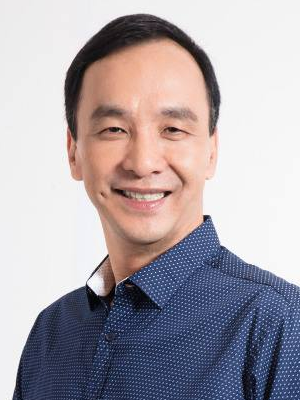

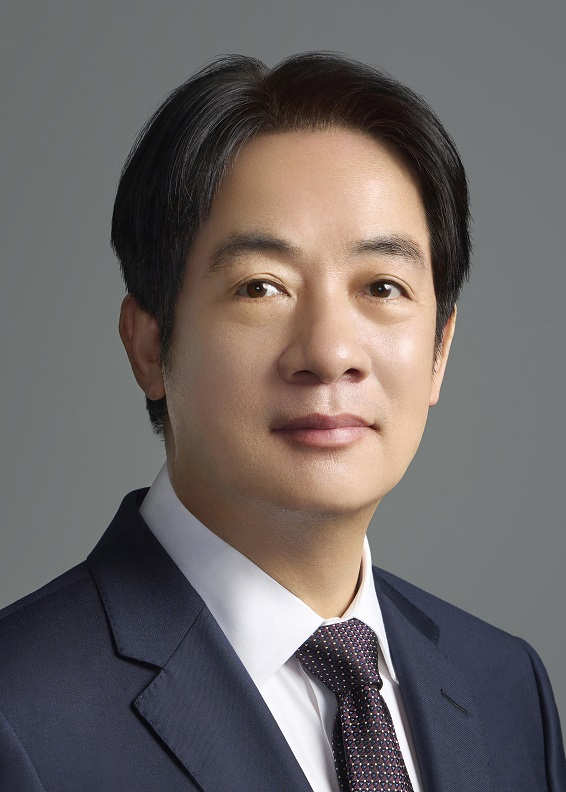

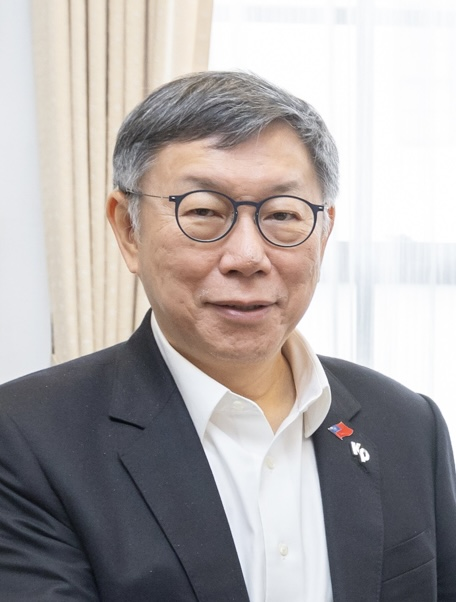
	Majority party	Minority party	Third party
Leader	Eric Chu	Lai Ching-te	Ko Wen-je
Party	KMT	DPP	TPP
Last election	38 seats	61 seats	5 seats
Seats won	52	51	8
Seat change	▲14	▼10	▲3
Constituency vote	5,510,850; 39.96%; ▼0.75pp	6,095,276; 45.09%; ▼0.02pp	403,357; 2.98%; ▲1.11pp
Party vote	4,764,576; 34.58%; ▲1.22pp	4,982,062; 36.16%; ▲2.18pp	3,040,615; 22.07%; ▲10.85pp
President before election
Yu Shyi-kun
DPP
Elected President
Han Kuo-yu
KMT

Legislative elections were held in Taiwan on 13 January 2024 to elect members of the Legislative Yuan. The elections were held alongside presidential elections.

The results saw the ruling Democratic Progressive Party (DPP) lose its majority in the Legislative Yuan that it had held since 2016, losing 11 seats and retaining 51, while the Kuomintang (KMT) became the largest single party with 52 seats, and the Taiwan People's Party (TPP) won eight seats. The New Power Party lost all its three seats after failing to win a constituency seat or meet the 5% threshold for at-large representation. The election marked the first time under the current electoral system (introduced in 2008) that no party held an absolute majority in the Legislative Yuan, and the first in which the largest party in the legislature won neither the most constituency votes nor the most party votes. The term of the Legislative Yuan began on 1 February 2024.

== Electoral system ==
The 113 seats of the Legislative Yuan are elected through parallel voting:

- 73 seats are elected through First-past-the-post voting in single member constituencies,
- 6 seats are reserved for Taiwanese aboriginals elected through single non-transferable vote in two 3-member constituencies, Lowland and Highland,
- 34 seats are elected through party-list proportional representation in a single nationwide constituency with a 5% electoral threshold, and 50% of list seats won must be women.

Taiwan's Central Election Commission uses an active household registration system, therefore no citizen has to actively register. Electronic voting is not implemented in Taiwanese elections, nor is absentee voting.

== Contesting parties and candidates ==
A total of 315 candidates registered for first-past-the-post seats in the 2024 legislative election. Sixteen political parties submitted party lists to the Central Election Commission (CEC). A total of 178 nominees were included on party lists. On 15 December 2023, the CEC announced that six first-past-the post candidates, one candidate running for a reserved indigenous seat, and one party list candidate, were ineligible. The campaign period officially started on 16 December 2023.

Party	General seats	Aboriginal seats	Party list	Total
Democratic Progressive Party	69	2	34	105
Kuomintang	64	4	34	102
Taiwan People's Party	10	1	34	45
New Power Party	2	0	8	10
Taiwan Statebuilding Party	2	0	7	9
People First Party	0	0	10	10
Green Party	1	0	8	9
New Party	1	1	8	10
Taiwan Solidarity Union	0	0	6	6
Taiwan Renewal Party	10	1	3	14
Chinese Unification Promotion Party	10	0	4	14
Formosa Alliance	1	0	0	1
Labor Party	2	0	0	2
Independent	65	9	－	74
Others	72	1	21	94
Total	309	19	177	505

== Results ==
The Kuomintang won 52 seats, making it the largest single party in the Legislative Yuan. The DPP, having won 51 seats, declined to the second largest party in the Legislative Yuan. The Taiwan People's Party (TPP) ranked the third with 8 seats under its control. The DPP lost 11 seats in the election, which also meant the loss of the parliamentary majority that it had held since 2016. The election results also led to the removal of the New Power Party, which previously held three seats, from the Legislative Yuan after it failed to win a constituency seat or meet the 5% threshold needed to win at-large seats. Two independents, namely Chen Chao-ming and Kao Chin Su-mei, who were members of the Kuomintang caucus in the 10th Yuan, were also elected.

The election was the first in Taiwanese history in which the party that received the most votes did not win the most seats, and also marked the first time since 2004 that no party held an absolute majority in the Legislative Yuan. This put the TPP in a "kingmaker" position; it also meant that the TPP’s support was crucial in the selection of the President of the Legislative Yuan and the major policies.

The election was also the first time that an openly bisexual candidate, Huang Jie (DPP) of Kaohsiung city's sixth constituency, was elected to the Legislative Yuan. It was also the first time that an openly transgender person, Abbygail ET Wu of the Green Party (at-large), ran for the chamber, albeit unsuccessfully.

Party	Party-list			Constituency/Aboriginal			Total seats	+/–
Party	Votes	%	Seats	Votes	%	Seats	Total seats	+/–
Democratic Progressive Party	4,982,062	36.16	13	6,095,276	45.09	38	51	–10
Kuomintang	4,764,576	34.58	13	5,401,933	39.96	39	52	+14
Taiwan People's Party	3,040,615	22.07	8	403,357	2.98	0	8	+3
New Power Party	353,670	2.57	0	96,589	0.71	0	0	–3
Taiwan Obasang Political Equality Party	128,613	0.93	0	78,138	0.58	0	0	New
Green Party Taiwan	117,298	0.85	0	15,557	0.12	0	0	0
Taiwan Statebuilding Party	95,078	0.69	0	32,583	0.24	0	0	–1
People First Party	69,817	0.51	0				0	0
MiLinguall Party	44,852	0.33	0	55,937	0.41	0	0	New
Taiwan Solidarity Union	43,372	0.31	0				0	0
New Party	40,429	0.29	0	9,143	0.07	0	0	0
Judicial Revolution Party	37,755	0.27	0	38,685	0.29	0	0	New
Institutional Island of Saving the World	19,691	0.14	0	11,260	0.08	0	0	New
Chinese Unification Promotion Party	18,425	0.13	0	13,203	0.10	0	0	0
The People Union Party	11,746	0.09	0	25,216	0.19	0	0	New
Taiwan Renewal Party	10,303	0.07	0	33,347	0.25	0	0	0
Social Democratic Party				74,375	0.55	0	0	New
Formosa Alliance				15,433	0.11	0	0	0
Taiwan Mahjong Greatest Party				7,839	0.06	0	0	New
Rehabilitation Alliance Party				7,441	0.06	0	0	New
Labor Party				6,453	0.05	0	0	0
Law Justice Party				6,331	0.05	0	0	New
United China Party				4,139	0.03	0	0	New
Taiwan Nationalist Party				3,293	0.02	0	0	New
Taiwan Revolutionary Party				3,072	0.02	0	0	0
Chinese Culture Republican Party				2,583	0.02	0	0	New
Family Basic Income				2,361	0.02	0	0	New
Taiwan Manipulative Therapist Union Labor Party				1,881	0.01	0	0	New
Chinese Women's Party				1,029	0.01	0	0	0
People's Democratic Party				836	0.01	0	0	0
Economic Party				472	0.00	0	0	New
Chinese Patriot Alliance Party				310	0.00	0	0	New
United Action Alliance				174	0.00	0	0	0
Revival of the Chinese Alliance				136	0.00	0	0	New
Independents				1,069,758	7.91	2	2	–3
Total	13,778,302	100.00	34	13,518,140	100.00	79	113	0
Valid votes	13,778,302	98.10		13,518,140	97.41			
Invalid/blank votes	267,306	1.90		359,917	2.59			
Total votes	14,045,608	100.00		13,878,057	100.00			
Registered voters/turnout	19,566,007	71.79		19,468,969	71.28			
Source: Central Election Commission

=== By constituency ===
Constituency		Result	Incumbent member	Elected member
Taipei City	1	DPP hold	Rosalia Wu	
Taipei City	2	DPP hold	Ho Chih-wei	Wang Shih-chien
Taipei City	3	Kuomintang hold	Wang Hung-wei	
Taipei City	4	Kuomintang gain from DPP	Kao Chia-yu	Lee Yen-hsiu
Taipei City	5	DPP hold	Freddy Lim	Wu Pei-yi
Taipei City	6	Kuomintang hold	Vacant (Note: The former legislator of this constituency, Lin Yi-hua of the Kuomintang, resigned in February 2023 to take the position of deputy mayor of Taipei. Since the remaining term was less than one year, no by-election was held. Source: "Legislator's plan to delay Taipei post questioned". Taipei Times. 2022-12-25.)	Lo Chih-chiang
Taipei City	7	Kuomintang hold	Alex Fai	Hsu Chiao-hsin
Taipei City	8	Kuomintang hold	Lai Shyh-bao	
New Taipei City	1	Kuomintang hold	Hung Mong-kai	
New Taipei City	2	DPP hold	Lin Shu-fen	
New Taipei City	3	DPP hold	Yu Tian	Lee Kuen-cheng
New Taipei City	4	DPP hold	Wu Ping-jui	
New Taipei City	5	DPP hold	Su Chiao-hui	
New Taipei City	6	DPP hold	Chang Hung-lu	
New Taipei City	7	Kuomintang gain from DPP	Lo Chih-cheng	Yeh Yuan-chih
New Taipei City	8	Kuomintang gain from DPP	Chiang Yung-chang	Chang Chih-lun
New Taipei City	9	Kuomintang hold	Lin Te-fu	
New Taipei City	10	DPP hold	Wu Chi-ming	
New Taipei City	11	Kuomintang hold	Lo Ming-tsai	
New Taipei City	12	Kuomintang gain from DPP	Lai Pin-yu	Liao Hsien-hsiang
Taoyuan City	1	Kuomintang gain from DPP	Cheng Yun-peng	Niu Hsu-ting
Taoyuan City	2	Kuomintang gain from DPP	Huang Shier-chieh	Tu Chuan-chi
Taoyuan City	3	Kuomintang hold	Lu Ming-che	
Taoyuan City	4	Kuomintang hold	Wan Mei-ling	
Taoyuan City	5	Kuomintang hold	Lu Yu-ling	
Taoyuan City	6	Kuomintang gain from Independent	Chao Cheng-yu	Chiu Jo-hua
Taichung City	1	DPP hold	Tsai Chi-chang	
Taichung City	2	Kuomintang gain from DPP	Lin Ching-yi	Yen Kuan-heng
Taichung City	3	Kuomintang hold	Yang Chiung-ying	
Taichung City	4	Kuomintang gain from DPP	Chang Liao Wan-chien	Sean Liao Wei-hsiang
Taichung City	5	Kuomintang gain from DPP	Zhuang Ching-cheng	Huang Chien-hao
Taichung City	6	Kuomintang gain from DPP	Huang Kuo-shu	Lo Ting-wei
Taichung City	7	DPP hold	Ho Hsin-chun	
Taichung City	8	Kuomintang hold	Johnny Chiang	
Tainan City	1	DPP hold	Lai Huei-yuen	
Tainan City	2	DPP hold	Kuo Kuo-wen	
Tainan City	3	DPP hold	Chen Ting-fei	
Tainan City	4	DPP hold	Lin I-chin	
Tainan City	5	DPP hold	Lin Chun-hsien	
Tainan City	6	DPP hold	Wang Ting-yu	
Kaohsiung City	1	DPP hold	Chiu Yi-ying	
Kaohsiung City	2	DPP hold	Chiu Chih-wei	
Kaohsiung City	3	DPP hold	Liu Shyh-fang	Lee Po-yi
Kaohsiung City	4	DPP hold	Lin Tai-hua	
Kaohsiung City	5	DPP hold	Lee Kun-tse	
Kaohsiung City	6	DPP hold	Chao Tien-lin	Huang Jie
Kaohsiung City	7	DPP hold	Hsu Chih-chieh	
Kaohsiung City	8	DPP hold	Lai Jui-lung	
Hsinchu County	1	Kuomintang hold	Lin Wei-chou	Hsu Hsin-ying
Hsinchu County	2	Kuomintang hold	Lin Si-ming	
Miaoli County	1	Independent hold	Chen Chao-ming	
Miaoli County	2	Kuomintang hold	Hsu Chih-jung	Chiu Chen-chun
Changhua County	1	DPP hold	Chen Hsiu-bao	
Changhua County	2	DPP hold	Huang Hsiu-fang	
Changhua County	3	Kuomintang hold	Hsieh Yi-fong	
Changhua County	4	DPP hold	Chen Su-yueh	
Nantou County	1	Kuomintang hold	Ma Wen-chun	
Nantou County	2	Kuomintang gain from DPP	Frida Tsai	Yu Hao
Yunlin County	1	Kuomintang gain from DPP	Su Chih-fen	Ting Hsueh-chung
Yunlin County	2	DPP hold	Liu Chien-kuo	
Chiayi County	1	DPP hold	Tsai Yi-yu	
Chiayi County	2	DPP hold	Chen Ming-wen	Chen Kuan-ting
Pingtung County	1	DPP hold	Chung Chia-pin	
Pingtung County	2	DPP gain from Independent	Su Chen-ching	Hsu Fu-kuei
Yilan County		DPP hold	Chen Ou-po	Chen Chun-yu
Hualien County		Kuomintang hold	Fu Kun-chi	
Taitung County		Kuomintang gain from Independent	Liu Chao-how	Huang Chien-pin
Penghu County		DPP hold	Yang Yao	
Kinmen County		Kuomintang hold	Chen Yu-jen	
Lienchiang County		Kuomintang hold	Cheng Hsueh-sheng	
Keelung City		Kuomintang gain from DPP	Tsai Shih-ying	Jonathan Lin
Hsinchu City		Kuomintang hold	Cheng Cheng-chien	
Chiayi City		DPP hold	Wang Mei-hui	
Lowland Aboriginal	1	Kuomintang hold	Zheng Tian-cai (Sra Kacaw)	
Lowland Aboriginal	2	DPP hold	Chen Ying (Asenay Daliyalrep)	
Lowland Aboriginal	3	Kuomintang hold	Liao Kuo-tung (Sufin Siluko)	Huang Jen (Kin Cyang)
Highland Aboriginal	1	Independent hold	Kao Chin Su-mei (Ciwas Ali)	
Highland Aboriginal	2	DPP hold	Wu Li-hua (Saidhai Tahovecahe)	
Highland Aboriginal	3	Kuomintang hold	Kung Wen-chi (Yosi Takun)	Lu Hsien-yi (Sasuyu Ruljuwan)

=== By National-at-large ===
National-at-large legislators are apportioned by largest remainder method. Political parties will gain seats upon reaching the 5% threshold and allocated based on total votes. The quota remains as 2.9412%, each political party will be allocated a seat. The remainder will be allocated based on the largest remainder (Remainder: Democratic Progressive Party 0.7244%; Kuomintang 1.9683%; Taiwan People's Party 0.2496%).

2024 Taiwanese legislative election national-at-large party vote share with elected national-at-large members
Counties/Cities	Total Voters	Democratic Progressive Party		Kuomintang		Taiwan People's Party	
Counties/Cities	Total Voters	Votes	Votes %	Votes	Votes %	Votes	Votes %
Taipei	2,090,062	511,126	33.36%	575,004	37.53%	334,389	21.83%
New Taipei City	3,402,064	846,766	34.81%	854,558	35.13%	556,980	22.90%
Keelung	312,207	67,018	31.01%	85,320	39.48%	48,401	22.40%
Yilan County	379,026	107,725	41.02%	78,944	30.06%	58,456	22.26%
Taoyuan City	1,882,592	429,373	32.14%	475,063	35.56%	338,329	25.32%
Hsinchu County	466,558	79,315	23.59%	132,160	39.31%	96,734	28.78%
Hsinchu City	359,465	79,721	30.20%	83,499	31.63%	77,496	29.35%
Miaoli County	447,767	79,224	25.32%	135,107	43.18%	72,815	23.27%
Taichung City	2,328,896	568,839	33.74%	576,758	34.21%	416,866	24.73%
Changhua County	1,032,636	251,994	34.58%	255,616	35.08%	170,903	23.45%
Nantou County	407,149	91,948	32.66%	114,454	40.66%	56,939	20.23%
Yunlin County	560,296	151,912	40.77%	119,039	31.95%	77,581	20.82%
Chiayi County	423,199	126,328	44.20%	84,207	29.46%	54,451	19.05%
Chiayi City	217,549	60,947	39.07%	50,475	32.35%	33,507	21.48%
Tainan City	1,567,432	508,784	45.97%	296,987	26.83%	214,469	19.38%
Kaohsiung City	2,312,303	728,109	44.90%	496,423	30.61%	283,062	17.46%
Pingtung County	681,631	207,893	44.40%	153,480	32.78%	76,870	16.42%
Taitung County	178,728	25,918	24.17%	56,017	52.23%	18,182	16.95%
Hualien County	267,824	36,580	21.45%	90,090	52.85%	33,383	19.57%
Penghu County	92,642	17,472	36.24%	18,523	38.42%	9,395	19.49%
Kinmen County	126,422	3,586	7.97%	28,688	63.79%	9,796	21.7%
Lienchiang County	12,083	482	7.96%	3,881	64.12%	1,330	21.97%
Note：: Total votes are accurate as per Republic of China Central Election Commission

Elected National-at-large members
Democratic Progressive Party	Kuomintang	Taiwan People's Party
Lin Yueh-chin; Puma Shen; Ariel Chang; Hung Sun-han; Loh Meei-ling; You Si-kun; Fan Yun; Ker Chien-ming; Shen Fa-hui; Chuang Jui-hsiung; Michelle Lin; Jean Kuo; Chen Pei-yu	Han Kuo-yu; Ko Chih-en; Ko Ju-chun; Weng Hsiao-ling; Chen Jing-hui; Wu Tsung-hsien; Lin Chien-chi; Chen Yeong-kang; Hsu Yu-chen; Hsieh Lung-chieh; Su Ching-chuan; Chang Chia-chun; Wang Yu-min	Huang Shan-shan; Huang Kuo-chang; Chen Gau-tzu; Wu Chun-cheng; Mạch Ngọc Trân; Lin Kuo-cheng; Lin Yi-chun; Chang Chi-kai

== Aftermath ==
At the opening of the new Legislative Yuan on 1 February 2024, Han Kuo-yu of the Kuomintang was elected as President of the Legislative Yuan following two rounds of voting in which all eight members of the TPP abstained in the second round. Han obtained the support of the KMT's 52 members in the Legislative Yuan as well as two independents and defeated the DPP's You Si-kun and the TPP's Huang Shan-shan. The KMT's Johnny Chiang was also elected as deputy speaker, defeating the DPP's Tsai Chi-chang and the TPP's Chang Chi-kai.

== See also ==
- 2024 Taiwanese general election
  - 2024 Taiwanese presidential election
- 2025 Taiwanese mass electoral recall campaigns
  - 2025 Taiwanese recall votes
