= Xu Zhijie =

Xu Zhijie may refer to:

- Hsu Chi-chieh (born 1988), Taiwanese swimmer
- Hsu Chih-chieh (born 1966), Taiwanese politician
