= Tainan City Constituency 4 =

Constituency of the Legislative Yuan of Taiwan

- Single-member constituency for the Legislative Yuan
- District(s): Sinshih, Yongkang, Sinhua
- Electorate: 259,650 (2024 election)

Current constituency
- Created: 2020
- Party: DPP
- Member: Lin I-chin
- Created from: Tainan City Constituency 2 (2008-2020) - Sinshih and Sinhua only Tainan City Constituency 5 (2008-2020) - Yongkang only

Tainan City Constituency 4 (Chinese: 臺南市第四選舉區) is one of the 73 regional constituencies represented in the Legislative Yuan, the national legislature of Taiwan. It was created in 2020 following boundary changes across Taiwan, and elects one legislator, through first-past-the-post voting, to the Legislative Yuan. It has been represented by Lin I-chin of the Democratic Progressive Party since 2020.

== Legislators ==
Election	Legislator	Party
2020	Lin I-chin	Democratic Progressive Party

== Election results ==

=== 2020 ===
2020 Taiwanese legislative election: Tainan 4
Candidate	Party	Votes	%
Lin I-chin	Democratic Progressive Party	113,046	59.11
Lin Yen-chu	Kuomintang	71,052	37.15
Tsai Ming-feng	Independent	4,180	2.19
Lin Chih-wen	Taiwan Action Party Alliance	1,860	0.97
Lin Shu-chuan	Interfaith Union	636	0.33
Wen Mi-le	Round Party	488	0.26
Total		191,262	100.00
Valid votes		191,262	98.35
Invalid/blank votes		3,217	1.65
Total votes		194,479	100.00
Registered voters/turnout		254,823	76.32
Majority		41,994	21.96
Democratic Progressive Party win (new seat)			

=== 2024 ===
* denotes the incumbent legislator

2024 Taiwanese legislative election: Tainan 4
Candidate	Party	Votes	%	+/–
Lin I-chin*	Democratic Progressive Party	104,688	57.48	▼1.63
Li Chuan-chiao	Independent (Note: Kuomintang-affiliated)	67,357	36.98	NEW
Liu Ching-tien	Judicial Revolution Party	10,082	5.54	NEW
Total		182,127	100.00	–
Valid votes		182,127	96.30	
Invalid/blank votes		6,988	3.70	
Total votes		189,115	100.00	
Registered voters/turnout		259,650	72.83	
Majority		37,331	20.5	
Democratic Progressive Party hold				
