= Tainan City Constituency 3 =

Constituency of the Legislative Yuan of Taiwan

Tainan City Constituency 2
- Single-member constituency for the Legislative Yuan
- District(s): Annan, North
- Electorate: 270,260 (2024 election)

Current constituency
- Created: 2020
- Party: DPP
- Member: Chen Ting-fei
- Created from: Tainan City Constituency 3 (2008-2020) - without West Central

Tainan City Constituency 3 (Chinese: 臺南市第三選舉區) is one of the 73 regional constituencies represented in the Legislative Yuan, the national legislature of Taiwan. It was created in 2020 following boundary changes across Taiwan, and elects one legislator, through first-past-the-post voting, to the Legislative Yuan. It has been represented by Chen Ting-fei of the Democratic Progressive Party since 2020.

== Legislators ==
Election	Legislator	Party
2020	Chen Ting-fei	Democratic Progressive Party

== Election results ==

=== 2020 ===
2020 Taiwanese legislative election: Tainan 3
Candidate	Party	Votes	%
Chen Ting-fei	Democratic Progressive Party	136,815	69.77
Tung Hsiao-yun	Kuomintang	52,886	26.97
Teng Hsiu-pao	People First Party	3,493	1.78
Chen Hsi-an	Independent	2,892	1.47
Total		196,086	100.00
Valid votes		196,086	97.73
Invalid/blank votes		4,549	2.27
Total votes		200,635	100.00
Registered voters/turnout		263,159	76.24
Majority		83,929	42.8
Democratic Progressive Party win (new seat)			

=== 2024 ===
* denotes the incumbent legislator

2024 Taiwanese legislative election: Tainan 3
Candidate	Party	Votes	%	+/–
Chen Ting-fei*	Democratic Progressive Party	132,377	70.14	▲0.37
Yao Cheng-yu	Kuomintang	56,348	29.86	NEW
Total		188,725	100.00	–
Valid votes		188,725	96.38	
Invalid/blank votes		7,084	3.62	
Total votes		195,809	100.00	
Registered voters/turnout		270,260	72.45	
Majority		76,029	40.28	
Democratic Progressive Party hold				
