= Kaohsiung City Constituency 7 =

Constituency of the Legislative Yuan of Taiwan

- Single-member constituency for the Legislative Yuan
- District(s): Fengshan
- Electorate: 293,502 (2024 election)

Current constituency
- Created: 2008 (as Kaohsiung County Constituency 4); 2010 (as Kaohsiung City Constituency 8); 2020 (current name)
- Party: DPP
- Member: Hsu Chih-chieh

Kaohsiung City Constituency 7 (Chinese: 高雄市第七選舉區) is one of the 73 regional constituencies represented in the Legislative Yuan, the national legislature of Taiwan. It was created in 2008 (as Kaohsiung County Constituency 4) following a series of constitutional reforms, and elects one legislator, through first-past-the-post voting, to the Legislative Yuan. It has been represented by Hsu Chih-chieh of the Democratic Progressive Party since 2012.

== Legislators ==
| Election | Legislator | Party |
|---|---|---|
| 2008 - 2012 | Chiang Lin-chun | Kuomintang |
| 2012 | Hsu Chih-chieh | Democratic Progressive Party |

== Election results ==

=== 2008 (Note: Named Kaohsiung County Constituency 4, boundaries unchanged) ===
2008 Taiwanese legislative election: Kaohsiung County 4
| Candidate | Party | Votes | % |
|---|---|---|---|
| Chiang Lin-chun | Kuomintang | 74,062 | 50.23 |
| Lin Tai-hua | Democratic Progressive Party | 71,450 | 48.46 |
| Wu Lung-chieh | Taiwan Solidarity Union | 1,095 | 0.74 |
| Yang Tung-chieh | Taiwan Farmers' Party | 377 | 0.26 |
| Chang Mei-hsien | Civil Party | 266 | 0.18 |
| Chen Ming-cheng | Third Society Party | 204 | 0.14 |
| Total | | 147,454 | 100.00 |
| Valid votes | | 147,454 | 98.87 |
| Invalid/blank votes | | 1,690 | 1.13 |
| Total votes | | 149,144 | 100.00 |
| Registered voters/turnout | | 253,525 | 58.83 |
| Majority | | 2,612 | 1.77 |
| Kuomintang win (new seat) | | | |

=== 2012 (Note: Named Kaohsiung City Constituency 8, boundaries unchanged) ===
* denotes the incumbent representative

2012 Taiwanese legislative election: Kaohsiung 8
| Candidate | Party | Votes | % | +/– |
|---|---|---|---|---|
| Hsu Chih-chieh | Democratic Progressive Party | 104,292 | 51.97 | ▲3.51 |
| Chiang Lin-chun* | Kuomintang | 90,186 | 44.94 | ▼5.29 |
| Cheng Fu-hua | Independent | 3,069 | 1.53 | NEW |
| Lin Ching-yuan | Independent | 2,370 | 1.18 | NEW |
| Huang Chien-fu | People Union Party | 777 | 0.39 | NEW |
| Total | | 200,694 | 100.00 | – |
| Valid votes | | 200,694 | 98.78 | |
| Invalid/blank votes | | 2,479 | 1.22 | |
| Total votes | | 203,173 | 100.00 | |
| Registered voters/turnout | | 266,958 | 76.11 | |
| Majority | | 14,106 | 7.03 | |
| Democratic Progressive Party gain from Kuomintang | | | | |

=== 2016 (Note: Named Kaohsiung City Constituency 8, boundaries unchanged) ===
* denotes the incumbent representative

2016 Taiwanese legislative election: Kaohsiung 8
| Candidate | Party | Votes | % | +/– |
|---|---|---|---|---|
| Hsu Chih-chieh* | Democratic Progressive Party | 110,276 | 59.13 | ▲7.16 |
| Huang Hsi-wen | Kuomintang | 58,967 | 31.62 | ▼13.32 |
| Chen Han-ku | New Power Party | 9,681 | 5.19 | NEW |
| Chang Yu-hua | People's Democratic Front | 2,476 | 1.33 | NEW |
| Liu I-hsiung | Military, Civil Servants and Teachers Alliance Party | 2,136 | 1.15 | NEW |
| Ma Kai-ni | Social Welfare Party | 1,637 | 0.88 | NEW |
| Wang Ting-hsuan | Chinese Unification Promotion Party | 1,315 | 0.71 | NEW |
| Total | | 186,488 | 100.00 | – |
| Valid votes | | 186,488 | 98.14 | |
| Invalid/blank votes | | 3,537 | 1.86 | |
| Total votes | | 190,025 | 100.00 | |
| Registered voters/turnout | | 281,637 | 67.47 | |
| Majority | | 51,309 | 27.51 | |
| Democratic Progressive Party hold | | | | |

=== 2020 ===
* denotes the incumbent representative

2020 Taiwanese legislative election: Kaohsiung 7
| Candidate | Party | Votes | % | +/– |
|---|---|---|---|---|
| Hsu Chih-chieh* | Democratic Progressive Party | 114,998 | 51.10 | ▼8.03 |
| Li Ya-ching | Kuomintang | 86,127 | 38.27 | ▲6.65 |
| Chen Hui-min | New Power Party | 17,466 | 7.76 | ▲2.57 |
| Chin Shih-yen | People First Party | 3,920 | 1.74 | NEW |
| Lin Chieh-cheng | Independent | 1,405 | 0.62 | NEW |
| Yeh Feng-chiang | Independent | 822 | 0.37 | NEW |
| Wu Ching-mu | Sovereign State for Formosa & Pescadores Party | 296 | 0.13 | NEW |
| Total | | 225,034 | 100.00 | – |
| Valid votes | | 225,034 | 98.78 | |
| Invalid/blank votes | | 2,771 | 1.22 | |
| Total votes | | 227,805 | 100.00 | |
| Registered voters/turnout | | 290,775 | 78.34 | |
| Majority | | 28,871 | 12.83 | |
| Democratic Progressive Party hold | | | | |

=== 2024 ===
* denotes the incumbent representative

2024 Taiwanese legislative election: Kaohsiung 7
| Candidate | Party | Votes | % | +/– |
|---|---|---|---|---|
| Hsu Chih-chieh* | Democratic Progressive Party | 109,484 | 52.65 | ▲1.55 |
| Chung Yi-chung | Kuomintang | 89,355 | 42.97 | ▲4.70 |
| Hung Chi-hsiu | Independent | 7,978 | 3.84 | NEW |
| Wang Ho-ping-tung-i | Judicial Revolution Party | 1,141 | 0.55 | NEW |
| Total | | 207,958 | 100.00 | – |
| Valid votes | | 207,958 | 98.17 | |
| Invalid/blank votes | | 3,871 | 1.83 | |
| Total votes | | 211,829 | 100.00 | |
| Registered voters/turnout | | 293,502 | 72.17 | |
| Majority | | 20,129 | 9.68 | |
| Democratic Progressive Party hold | | | | |
