= Tainan City Constituency 1 =

Constituency of the Legislative Yuan of Taiwan

- Single-member constituency for the Legislative Yuan
- District(s): Houbi, Baihe, Beimen, Syuejia, Yanshuei, Xinying, Liouying, Dongshan, Jiangjun, Xiaying, Liujia
- Electorate: 245,226 (2024 election)

Current constituency
- Created: 2020
- Party: DPP
- Member: Lai Hui-yuan
- Created from: Tainan City Constituency 1 (2008-2020) - without Guantian

Tainan City Constituency 1 (Chinese: 臺南市第一選舉區) is one of the 73 regional constituencies represented in the Legislative Yuan, the national legislature of Taiwan. It was created in 2020 following boundary changes across Taiwan, and elects one legislator, through first-past-the-post voting, to the Legislative Yuan. It has been represented by Lai Hui-yuan of the Democratic Progressive Party since 2020.

== Legislators ==
Election	Legislator	Party
2020	Lai Hui-yuan	Democratic Progressive Party

== Election results ==

=== 2020 ===
2020 Taiwanese legislative election: Tainan 1
Candidate	Party	Votes	%
Lai Hui-yuan	Democratic Progressive Party	99,344	55.59
Tsai Yu-hui	Kuomintang	68,568	38.37
Yen Yao-hsing	Taiwan People's Party	8,793	4.92
Tsai Cheng-yu	United Action Party	616	0.34
Huang Tien-chen	Taiwan People's Party (Note: Not affiliated with Taiwan People's Party)	534	0.30
Su Chih-jen	Interfaith Union	534	0.30
Kang Shu-min	Chinese United Party	306	0.17
Total		178,695	100.00
Valid votes		178,695	98.01
Invalid/blank votes		3,620	1.99
Total votes		182,315	100.00
Registered voters/turnout		250,801	72.69
Majority		30,776	17.22
Democratic Progressive Party win (new seat)			

=== 2024 ===
* denotes the incumbent legislator

2024 Taiwanese legislative election: Tainan 1
Candidate	Party	Votes	%	+/–
Lai Hui-yuan*	Democratic Progressive Party	96,662	60.26	▲4.67
Chou Hung-chang	Kuomintang	49,045	30.57	▼7.80
Wei Yao-chien	Independent	8,978	5.60	NEW
Hou Lu-tai	Independent	2,822	1.76	NEW
Lin Fang-chu	Chinese Unification Promotion Party	1,603	1.00	NEW
Tsai Cheng-yu	Rehabilitation Alliance Party	1,305	0.81	NEW
Total		160,415	100.00	–
Valid votes		160,415	96.13	
Invalid/blank votes		6,452	3.87	
Total votes		166,867	100.00	
Registered voters/turnout		245,226	68.05	
Majority		47,617	29.69	
Democratic Progressive Party hold				
