= Tainan City Constituency 2 =

Constituency of the Legislative Yuan of Taiwan

- Single-member constituency for the Legislative Yuan
- District(s): Cigu, Jiali, Madou, Guantian, Shanhua, Danei, Yujing, Nansi, Sigang, Anding, Shanshang, Zuojhen, Nanhua
- Electorate: 254,767 (2024 election)

Current constituency
- Created: 2020
- Party: DPP
- Member: Kuo Kuo-wen
- Created from: Tainan City Constituency 2 (2008-2020) - without Sinshih and Sinhua; Tainan City Constituency 1 (2008-2020) - Guantian only

Tainan City Constituency 2 (Chinese: 臺南市第二選舉區) is one of the 73 regional constituencies represented in the Legislative Yuan, the national legislature of Taiwan. It was created in 2020 following boundary changes across Taiwan, and elects one legislator, through first-past-the-post voting, to the Legislative Yuan. It has been represented by Kuo Kuo-wen of the Democratic Progressive Party since 2020.

== Legislators ==
Election	Legislator	Party
2020	Kuo Kuo-wen	Democratic Progressive Party

== Election results ==

=== 2020 ===
2020 Taiwanese legislative election: Tainan 2
Candidate	Party	Votes	%
Kuo Kuo-wen	Democratic Progressive Party	120,097	63.96
Li Wu-lung	Kuomintang	66,270	35.30
Wang Chang-chi	Interfaith Union	1,390	0.74
Total		187,757	100.00
Valid votes		187,757	98.07
Invalid/blank votes		3,693	1.93
Total votes		191,450	100.00
Registered voters/turnout		254,746	75.15
Majority		53,827	28.66
Democratic Progressive Party win (new seat)			

=== 2024 ===
* denotes the incumbent legislator

2024 Taiwanese legislative election: Tainan 2
Candidate	Party	Votes	%	+/–
Kuo Kuo-wen*	Democratic Progressive Party	97,981	54.93	▼9.03
Chen Kun-ho	Independent	76,614	42.95	NEW
Chan Chiu-hsien	The People Union Party	3,775	2.12	NEW
Total		178,370	100.00	–
Valid votes		178,370	97.70	
Invalid/blank votes		4,195	2.30	
Total votes		182,565	100.00	
Registered voters/turnout		254,767	71.66	
Majority		11.98	21,367	
Democratic Progressive Party hold				
