= Hsinchu County Constituency 1 =

Constituency of the Legislative Yuan of Taiwan

- Single-member constituency for the Legislative Yuan
- District(s): Xinfeng, Hukou, Xinpu, Qionglin, Guanxi, Jianshi, Zhubei City (12 villages)
- Electorate: 215,267 (2024 election)

Current constituency
- Created: 2020
- Party: Kuomintang
- Member: Hsu Hsin-ying
- Created from: Hsinchu County Constituency (part)

Hsinchu County Constituency 1 (Chinese: 新竹縣第一選舉區) is one of the 73 regional constituencies represented in the Legislative Yuan, the national legislature of Taiwan. It was created in 2020 following boundary changes across Taiwan, and elects one legislator, through first-past-the-post voting, to the Legislative Yuan. It has been represented by Hsu Hsin-ying of the Kuomintang since 2024.

== Legislators ==
Election	Legislator	Party
2020 - 2024	Lin Wei-chou	Kuomintang
2024	Hsu Hsin-ying	Kuomintang

== Election results ==

=== 2020 ===
2020 Taiwanese legislative election: Hsinchu County 1
Candidate	Party	Votes	%
Lin Wei-chou	Kuomintang	74,087	49.88
Chou Chiang-chieh	Democratic Progressive Party	54,862	36.93
Wu Hsu-chih	Congress Party Alliance	9,623	6.48
Yu Hsiao-ching	Green Party Taiwan	7,142	4.81
Fu Chia-hsien	Independent	1,655	1.11
Liu Fu-lan	Independent	1,176	0.79
Total		148,545	100.00
Valid votes		148,545	97.39
Invalid/blank votes		3,986	2.61
Total votes		152,531	100.00
Registered voters/turnout		205,119	74.36
Majority		19,225	12.95
Kuomintang win (new seat)			

=== 2024 ===
2024 Taiwanese legislative election: Hsinchu County 1
Candidate	Party	Votes	%	+/–
Hsu Hsin-ying	Kuomintang	84,959	55.91	▲6.03
Chan Chi-ti	Democratic Progressive Party	45,445	29.91	▼7.02
Yu Hsiao-ching	Green Party Taiwan	15,557	10.24	▲5.43
Liu Tai-nung	Taiwan Obasang Political Equality Party	4,610	3.03	NEW
Liu Fu-lan	Taiwan Renewal Party	1,392	0.92	NEW
Total		151,963	100.00	–
Valid votes		151,963	97.26	
Invalid/blank votes		4,282	2.74	
Total votes		156,245	100.00	
Registered voters/turnout		215,267	72.58	
Majority		39,514	26	
Kuomintang hold				
