= Kaohsiung City Constituency 5 (2020) =

Constituency of the Legislative Yuan of Taiwan

- Single-member constituency for the Legislative Yuan
- District(s): Sanmin, Lingya (8 villages)
- Electorate: 302,097 (2024 election)

Current constituency
- Created: 2019
- Party: DPP
- Member: Lee Kun-tse
- Created from: Kaohsiung City Constituency 5 (2010-2019), lost 3 districts, gained parts of Lingya

Kaohsiung City Constituency 5 (Chinese: 高雄市第五選舉區) is one of the 73 regional constituencies represented in the Legislative Yuan, the national legislature of Taiwan. It was created in 2020 following boundary changes across Taiwan, and elects one legislator, through first-past-the-post voting, to the Legislative Yuan. It has been represented by Lee Kun-tse of the Democratic Progressive Party since 2020.

== Legislators ==
Election	Legislator	Party
2020	Lee Kun-tse	Democratic Progressive Party

== Election results ==

=== 2020 ===
2020 Taiwanese legislative election: Kaohsiung 5
Candidate	Party	Votes	%
Lee Kun-tse	Democratic Progressive Party	123,239	52.27
Huang Pai-lin	Kuomintang	92,220	39.11
Li Chia-ling	Taiwan People's Party	20,336	8.62
Total		235,795	100.00
Valid votes		235,795	98.98
Invalid/blank votes		2,422	1.02
Total votes		238,217	100.00
Registered voters/turnout		303,844	78.40
Majority		31,019	13.16
Democratic Progressive Party win (new seat)			

=== 2024 ===
* denotes the incumbent representative

2024 Taiwanese legislative election: Kaohsiung 5
Candidate	Party	Votes	%	+/–
Lee Kun-tse*	Democratic Progressive Party	108,735	50.57	▼1.70
Huang Pai-lin	Kuomintang	90,046	41.88	▲2.77
Chang Fang-yu	Taiwan Obasang Political Equality Party	12,264	5.70	NEW
Yang Chiao-chiao	Independent	3,964	1.84	NEW
Total		215,009	100.00	–
Valid votes		215,009	98.58	
Invalid/blank votes		3,097	1.42	
Total votes		218,106	100.00	
Registered voters/turnout		302,097	72.20	
Majority		18,689	8.89	
Democratic Progressive Party hold				
