= Kaohsiung City Constituency 6 (2020) =

Constituency of the Legislative Yuan of Taiwan

- Single-member constituency for the Legislative Yuan
- District(s): Yancheng, Gushan, Xinxing, Cianjin, Lingya (61 villages)
- Electorate: 313,653 (2024 election)

Current constituency
- Created: 2020
- Party: DPP
- Member: Huang Jie

Kaohsiung City Constituency 6 (Chinese: 高雄市第六選舉區) is one of the 73 regional constituencies represented in the Legislative Yuan, the national legislature of Taiwan. It was created in 2020 following boundary changes across Taiwan, and elects one legislator, through first-past-the-post voting, to the Legislative Yuan. It has been represented by Huang Jie of the Democratic Progressive Party since 2024.

== Legislators ==
Election	Legislator	Party
2020 - 2024	Chao Tien-lin	Democratic Progressive Party
2024	Huang Jie	Democratic Progressive Party

== Election results ==

=== 2020 ===
2020 Taiwanese legislative election: Kaohsiung 6
Candidate	Party	Votes	%
Chao Tien-lin	Democratic Progressive Party	128,072	52.94
Chen Mei-ya	Kuomintang	92,337	38.17
Wu I-cheng	People First Party	11,964	4.95
Wu Pei-jung	Independent	4,112	1.70
Li Chien-hui	Taiwan Renewal Party	3,082	1.27
Lin Hung-cheng	Formosa Alliance	763	0.32
Chang Yu-hsuan	Labor Party (Taiwan)	690	0.29
Chou Chin-pang	Independent	447	0.18
Li Jung-jen	Congress Party Alliance	258	0.11
Liu Che-chia	Sovereign State for Formosa & Pescadores Party	183	0.08
Total		241,908	100.00
Valid votes		241,908	98.52
Invalid/blank votes		3,631	1.48
Total votes		245,539	100.00
Registered voters/turnout		317,268	77.39
Majority		35,735	14.77
Democratic Progressive Party win (new seat)			

=== 2024 ===
2024 Taiwanese legislative election: Kaohsiung 6
Candidate	Party	Votes	%	+/–
Huang Jie	Democratic Progressive Party	113,670	51.01	▼1.93
Chen Mei-ya	Kuomintang	93,750	42.07	▲3.90
Kuo Pei-hung	Formosa Alliance	15,433	6.93	▲6.61
Total		222,853	100.00	–
Valid votes		222,853	98.44	
Invalid/blank votes		3,528	1.56	
Total votes		226,381	100.00	
Registered voters/turnout		313,653	72.18	
Majority		19,920	8.94	
Democratic Progressive Party hold				
