= Yunlin County Constituency 1 =

Constituency of the Legislative Yuan of Taiwan

- Single-member constituency for the Legislative Yuan
- District(s): Mailiao, Taixi, Dongshi, Baozhong, Tuku, Huwei, Sihu, Yuanchang, Kouhu, Shuilin, Beigang
- Electorate: 275,008 (2024 election)

Current constituency
- Created: 2008
- Party: KMT
- Member: Ting Hsueh-chung

Yunlin County Constituency 1 (Chinese: 雲林縣第一選舉區; pinyin: Yúnlín Xiàn Dì-yī Xuǎnjǔ Qū) is one of the 73 regional constituencies represented in the Legislative Yuan, the national legislature of Taiwan. It was created in 2008 following a series of constitutional reforms, and elects one legislator, through first-past-the-post voting, to the Legislative Yuan. It has been represented by Ting Hsueh-chung of the Kuomintang since 2024.

== Legislators ==
Election	Legislator	Party
2008 - 2016	Chang Chia-Chun	Kuomintang
2016 - 2024	Su Chih-fen	Democratic Progressive Party
2024	Ting Hsueh-chung	Kuomintang

== Election results ==

=== 2008 ===
2008 Taiwanese legislative election: Yunlin County 1
Candidate	Party	Votes	%
Chang Chia-chun	Kuomintang	86,571	56.24
Chen Hsien-chung	Democratic Progressive Party	64,921	42.18
Tsai Huan-sheng	Independent	1,648	1.07
Huang Shan-ku	Green Party Taiwan	779	0.51
Total		153,919	100.00
Valid votes		153,919	97.92
Invalid/blank votes		3,269	2.08
Total votes		157,188	100.00
Registered voters/turnout		276,684	56.81
Majority		21,650	14.06
Kuomintang win (new seat)			

=== 2012 ===
* denotes the incumbent legislator

2012 Taiwanese legislative election: Yunlin County 1
Candidate	Party	Votes	%	+/–
Chang Chia-chun*	Kuomintang	90,811	50.44	▼5.80
Lee Chin-yung	Democratic Progressive Party	89,213	49.56	▲7.38
Total		180,024	100.00	–
Valid votes		180,024	97.76	
Invalid/blank votes		4,133	2.24	
Total votes		184,157	100.00	
Registered voters/turnout		278,433	66.14	
Majority		1,598	0.88	
Kuomintang hold				

=== 2016 ===
* denotes the incumbent legislator

2016 Taiwanese legislative election: Yunlin County 1
Candidate	Party	Votes	%	+/–
Su Chih-fen	Democratic Progressive Party	87,378	53.73	▲4.17
Chang Jung-chi*	Kuomintang	69,614	42.80	▼7.64
Lin fu-yuan	Trees Party	5,642	3.47	NEW
Total		162,634	100.00	–
Valid votes		162,634	96.95	
Invalid/blank votes		5,123	3.05	
Total votes		167,757	100.00	
Registered voters/turnout		279,736	59.97	
Majority		17,764	10.93	
Democratic Progressive Party gain from Kuomintang				

=== 2020 ===
* denotes the incumbent legislator

2020 Taiwanese legislative election: Yunlin County 1
Candidate	Party	Votes	%	+/–
Su Chih-fen*	Democratic Progressive Party	94,786	50.61	▼3.12
Chang Chia-chun	Kuomintang	86,862	46.38	▲3.58
Lin Fu-yuan	Independent	3,558	1.90	NEW
Li Chao-I	Taiwan Revolutionary Party	2,088	1.11	NEW
Total		187,294	100.00	–
Valid votes		187,294	97.64	
Invalid/blank votes		4,518	2.36	
Total votes		191,812	100.00	
Registered voters/turnout		278,458	68.88	
Majority		7,924	4.23	
Democratic Progressive Party hold				

=== 2024 ===
* denotes the incumbent legislator

2024 Taiwanese legislative election: Yunlin County 1
Candidate	Party	Votes	%	+/–
Ting Hsueh-chung	Kuomintang	84,736	47.77	▲1.39
Su Chih-fen*	Democratic Progressive Party	81,707	46.06	▼4.55
Chen Chun-lung	Independent	5,965	3.36	NEW
Li Chao-I	Taiwan Revolutionary Party	3,072	1.73	▲0.62
Wu Ping-hui	Independent	1,470	0.83	NEW
Kuo Ping-hung	Chinese Unification Promotion Party	445	0.25	NEW
Total		177,395	100.00	–
Valid votes		177,395	97.44	
Invalid/blank votes		4,669	2.56	
Total votes		182,064	100.00	
Registered voters/turnout		275,008	66.20	
Majority		3,029	1.71	
Kuomintang gain from Democratic Progressive Party				
