= Tainan City Constituency 6 =

Constituency of the Legislative Yuan of Taiwan

- Single-member constituency for the Legislative Yuan
- District(s): Rende, Gueiren, Guanmiao, Longci, East (29 villages)
- Electorate: 260,372 (2024 election)

Current constituency
- Created: 2020
- Party: DPP
- Member: Wang Ting-yu
- Created from: Tainan City Constituency 5 (2008–2020) - without Yongkang; Tainan City Constituency 4 (2008–2020) - 29 villages of East only

Tainan City Constituency 6 (Chinese: 臺南市第六選舉區) is one of the 73 regional constituencies represented in the Legislative Yuan, the national legislature of Taiwan. It was created in 2020 following boundary changes across Taiwan, and elects one legislator, through first-past-the-post voting, to the Legislative Yuan. It has been represented by Wang Ting-yu of the Democratic Progressive Party since 2020.

== Legislators ==
Election	Legislator	Party
2020	Wang Ting-yu	Democratic Progressive Party

== Election results ==

=== 2020 ===
2020 Taiwanese legislative election: Tainan 6
Candidate	Party	Votes	%
Wang Ting-yu	Democratic Progressive Party	116,174	58.85
Hung Hsiu-chu	Kuomintang	72,137	36.54
Li Chin-hao	Stabilizing Force Party	4,612	2.34
Weng Yu-han	Taiwan Renewal Party	3,255	1.65
Tang Yu-heng	Sovereign State for Formosa & Pescadores Party	1,228	0.62
Total		197,406	100.00
Valid votes		197,406	98.32
Invalid/blank votes		3,378	1.68
Total votes		200,784	100.00
Registered voters/turnout		256,866	78.17
Majority		44,037	22.31
Democratic Progressive Party win (new seat)			

=== 2024 ===
* denotes the incumbent legislator

2024 Taiwanese legislative election: Tainan 6
Candidate	Party	Votes	%	+/–
Wang Ting-yu*	Democratic Progressive Party	89,235	46.91	▼11.94
Chen I-hsin	Kuomintang	64,018	33.65	▼2.89
Chen Yung-ho	Independent	36,985	19.44	NEW
Total		190,238	100.00	–
Valid votes		190,238	98.19	
Invalid/blank votes		3,499	1.81	
Total votes		193,737	100.00	
Registered voters/turnout		260,372	74.41	
Majority		25,217	13.26	
Democratic Progressive Party hold				
