= Pingtung County Constituency 1 =

Constituency of the Legislative Yuan of Taiwan

- Single-member constituency for the Legislative Yuan
- District(s): Ligang, Gaoshu, Sandimen, Wutai, Jiuru, Yanpu, Changzhi, Neipu, Majia, Linluo, Pingtung City
- Electorate: 319,941 (2024 election)

Current constituency
- Created: 2020
- Party: DPP
- Member: Chung Chia-pin
- Created from: Pintung County Constituency 1 (2008-2020) - without 4 villages Pintung County Constituency 2 (2008-2020) - without Wandan

Pingtung County Constituency 1 (Chinese: 屏東縣第一選舉區) is one of the 73 regional constituencies represented in the Legislative Yuan, the national legislature of Taiwan. It was created in 2020 following boundary changes across Taiwan, and elects one legislator, through first-past-the-post voting, to the Legislative Yuan. It has been represented by Chung Chia-pin of the Democratic Progressive Party since 2020.

== Legislators ==
Election	Legislator	Party
2020	Chung Chia-pin	Democratic Progressive Party

== Election results ==

=== 2020 ===
2020 Taiwanese legislative election: Pingtung 1
Candidate	Party	Votes	%
Chung Chia-pin	Democratic Progressive Party	119,871	49.55
Yeh Shou-shan	Kuomintang	90,467	37.40
Chiang Yueh-hui	Independent	24,118	9.97
Pan Wei-lung	Taiwan Action Party Alliance	4,476	1.85
Huang Tung-hui	Independent	2,700	1.12
Chin Hung-ming	Independent	281	0.12
Total		241,913	100.00
Valid votes		241,913	98.73
Invalid/blank votes		3,118	1.27
Total votes		245,031	100.00
Registered voters/turnout		323,633	75.71
Majority		29,404	12.15
Democratic Progressive Party win (new seat)			

=== 2024 ===
* denotes the incumbent legislator

2024 Taiwanese legislative election: Pingtung 1
Candidate	Party	Votes	%	+/–
Chung Chia-pin*	Democratic Progressive Party	108,723	48.40	▼1.15
Huang Ming-hsien	Kuomintang	88,518	39.41	▲2.01
Chiang Yueh-hui	Independent	25,270	11.25	▲1.28
Tseng Yu-ting	Independent	1,158	0.52	NEW
Chang Ting-yuan	Taiwan Renewal Party	496	0.22	NEW
Li Meng-han	Chinese Unification Promotion Party	464	0.21	NEW
Total		224,629	100.00	–
Valid votes		224,629	98.47	
Invalid/blank votes		3,499	1.53	
Total votes		228,128	100.00	
Registered voters/turnout		319,941	71.30	
Majority		20,205	8.99	
Democratic Progressive Party hold				
