= Chu Fong-chi =

Taiwanese politician

Chu Fong-chi MLY
- 朱鳳芝
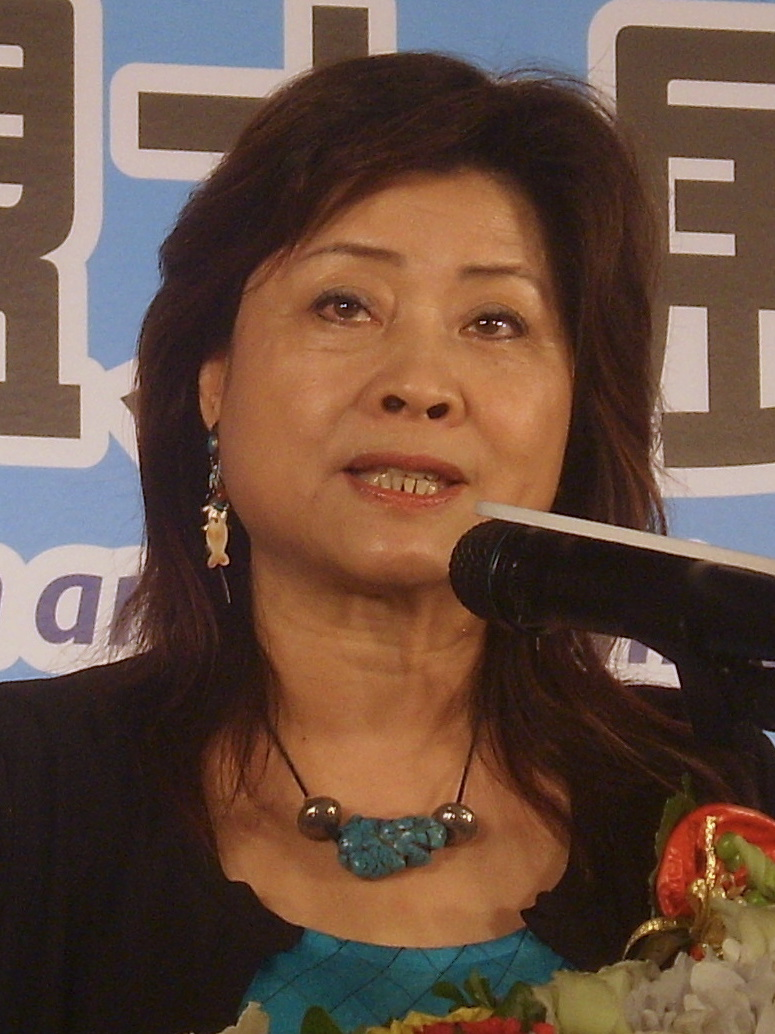

Member of the Legislative Yuan
- In office 1 February 2008 – 31 January 2012
- Succeeded by: Lu Yu-lin
- Constituency: Taoyuan 5
- In office 1 February 1990 – 31 January 2008
- Constituency: Taoyuan County

Personal details
- Born: 27 June 1948 (age 78) Taoyuan County, Taiwan
- Education: National Cheng Kung University (BA); Tamkang University; Northrop University (MA)

Chu Fong-chi (Chinese: 朱鳳芝; pinyin: Zhū Fèngzhī; 27 June 1948) is a Taiwanese politician who served in the Legislative Yuan from 1990 to 2012.

== Education ==
Chu is of Mainland Chinese descent. She attended National Cheng Kung University and Tamkang University in Taiwan, before continuing graduate studies in the United States. She then became a teacher.

== Political career ==
Prior to her election to the Legislative Yuan, Chu served on the Taoyuan County Council and was active in the China Youth Corps. Within the Kuomintang, Chu has served on the party's Central Standing Committee.

Chu was first elected to the legislature in 1989, and retained her seat though six subsequent elections, defeating Lee Yue-chin in 2008. Chu ended her 2012 reelection campaign after losing a primary.
