= Taipei City Constituency 8 =

Constituency of the Legislative Yuan of Taiwan

Taipei City Constituency VIII
- Single-member constituency for the Legislative Yuan
- District(s): Wenshan & parts of Zhongzheng

Current constituency
- Created: 2008
- Member(s): Lai Shyh-bao (2008–)

Taipei City Constituency VIII (Chinese: 臺北市第八選舉區; pinyin: Táiběi Shì Dì-bā Xuǎnjǔ Qū) includes all of Wenshan and part of Zhongzheng in southern Taipei. The district was created in 2008, when all local constituencies of the Legislative Yuan were reorganized to become single-member districts.

== Current district ==
- Wenshan
- Zhongzheng: 2 sub-districts
  - Gutting: 6 urban villages
    - Hedi, Dingdong, Yingxue, Banxi, Wangxi, Yingpu
  - Gongguan: 4 urban villages
    - Shuiyuan, Linxing, Wensheng, Fushui

== Legislators ==
Representative	Party	Dates	Notes
Lai Shyh-bao	Kuomintang	2008–	Incumbent

== Election results ==
=== 2016 ===
Legislative Election 2016: Taipei City Constituency VIII
Party	Candidate	Votes	%	±%
Kuomintang	Lai Shyh-bao (賴士葆)	83,931	49.69	
Independent	Lee Ching-yuan (李慶元)	60,459	35.80	
SDP	Miao Boya (苗博雅)	21,084	12.48	
Independent	Fang Jingjun (方景鈞)	1,540	0.91	
Independent	Lai Shusheng (賴樹聲)	1,071	0.63	
Independent	Chen Rusheng (陳如聖)	808	0.48	
Majority		23,472	13.89	
Total valid votes		168,893	97.99	
Rejected ballots		3,469	2.01	
Kuomintang hold		Swing		
Turnout		172,362	68.30	
Registered electors		252,360		

=== 2020 ===
Legislative Election 2020: Taipei City Constituency VIII
Party	Candidate	Votes	%	±%
Kuomintang	Lai Shyh-bao (賴士葆)	96,377	49.98	▲0.29
Democratic Progressive	Joshua J. S. Ruan (阮昭雄)	67,470	34.99	New
People's	Chang Hsing-song (張幸松)	12,111	6.28	New
Taiwan Animal Protection Party	Hua Pei-jun (華珮君)	7,660	3.97	New
Statebuilding	Yan Ming-wei (顏銘緯)	4,330	2.25	New
Green	Ko Shih-ling (柯士翎)	2,024	1.05	New
Independent	Peng Tzu-hsuan (彭子軒)	1,324	0.69	New
Independent	Lee Wen (李文)	1,064	0.55	New
Formosa Alliance	Hsiao Hsiao-ling (蕭曉玲)	474	0.25	New
Majority		28,907	14.99	▲1.10
Total valid votes		192,834	98.51	
Rejected ballots		2,920	1.49	
Kuomintang hold		Swing		
Turnout		195,754	76.96	▲8.66
Registered electors		254,363		

=== 2024 ===
Legislative Election 2024: Taipei City Constituency VIII
Party	Candidate	Votes	%	±%
Kuomintang	Lai Shyh-Bao (賴士葆)	87,099	47.46	▼2.52
Democratic Progressive	Wang Min-Sheng (王閔生)	59,490	32.42	▼2.57
People's	Jang Chyi-Lu (張其祿)	28,335	15.44	▲9.16
Taiwan Obasang Political Equality Party	Lai Sharon (賴宣任)	6,374	3.47	New
Taiwan Renewal Party	Liu Peiling (劉佩玲)	1,122	0.61	New
Independent	Hsia Wan-Lang (夏萬浪)	761	0.41	New
Independent	Chang Wei-Shyue (張維學)	201	0.11	New
Revival of the Chinese Alliance	Hu Chih-Chuang (胡之壯)	136	0.07	New
Majority		27,609	15.04	▲0.05
Total valid votes		183,518	98.59	
Rejected ballots		2,630	1.41	
Kuomintang hold		Swing	▲0.03	
Turnout		186,148	74.96	▼2.00
Registered electors		248,318		
