= Taipei City Constituency 7 =

Constituency of the Legislative Yuan of Taiwan

Taipei City Constituency VII
- Single-member constituency for the Legislative Yuan
- District(s): Xinyi & parts of Songshan

Current constituency
- Created: 2008
- Member: Hsu Chiao-hsin (2024–present)

Taipei City Constituency VII (Chinese: 臺北市第七選舉區; pinyin: Táiběi Shì Dì-qī Xuǎnjǔ Qū) includes all of Xinyi and part of Songshan in central Taipei. The district was created in 2008, when all local constituencies of the Legislative Yuan were reorganized to become single-member districts.

== Current district ==
- Xinyi
- Songshan: 2 sub-districts
  - Zhonglun: 9 urban villages
    - Zhongzheng, Jiren, Dunhua, Fuyuan, Fucheng, Zhonglun, Meiren, Fujian, Fushi
  - Beizhen: 4 urban villages
    - Xinju, Jixiang, Ciyou, Fusheng

== Legislators ==
Representative	Party	Dates	Notes
Alex Fai Hrong-tai	Kuomintang	2008–2024	
Hsu Chiao-hsin	Kuomintang	2024–present	Incumbent

== Election results ==
=== 2016 ===
Legislative Election 2016: Taipei City Constituency VII
Party	Candidate	Votes	%	±%
KMT	Alex Fai (費鴻泰)	74,455	45.05	
Independent	Yang Shih-chiu (楊實秋)	69,882	42.28	
SDP	Lu Hsin-chieh (呂欣潔)	17,747	10.74	
Independent	Lin Wenjie (林文傑)	1,063	0.64	
Peace Pigeon Union Party	Su Chengying (蘇承英)	689	0.42	
Independent	Zhan Yuzheng (詹益正)	625	0.38	
Independence	Lin Zhifen (林芷芬)	588	0.36	
TCA	Fan Yanglu (范揚律)	231	0.14	
Majority		4,573	2.77	
Total valid votes		165,280	98.21	
Rejected ballots		3,009	1.79	
KMT hold		Swing		
Turnout		168,289	67.62	
Registered electors		248,887		

=== 2020 ===
Legislative Election 2020: Taipei City Constituency VII
Party	Candidate	Votes	%	±%
KMT	Alex Fai (費鴻泰)	85,082	46.28	▲1.23
DPP	Hsu Shu-hua (許淑華)	79,057	43.00	New
TPP	Tsai Yi-fang (蔡宜芳)	17,435	9.48	New
Statebuilding	Wang Ying-hsing (王映心)	1,979	1.08	New
Free Speech Alliance	Su Yi-wen (蘇伊文)	290	0.16	New
Majority		6,025	3.28	▲0.51
Total valid votes		183,843	98.81	
Rejected ballots		2,219	1.19	
KMT hold		Swing		
Turnout		186,062	76.09	▲8.47
Registered electors		244,536		

=== 2024 ===
Legislative Election 2024: Taipei City Constituency VII
Party	Candidate	Votes	%	±%
KMT	Hsu Chiao-hsin (徐巧芯)	89,727	52.62	▲6.34
DPP	Hsu Shu-hua (許淑華)	76,113	44.64	▲1.64
Independent	Wayne Chen (陳韋安)	3,286	1.93	New
TRP	Luo Tan (羅丹)	1,073	0.63	New
PAA	Lee Chen-long (李承龍)	310	0.18	New
Majority		13,614	7.98	▲4.70
Total valid votes		170,509	98.19	
Rejected ballots		3,143	1.81	
KMT hold		Swing	▲2.35	
Turnout		173,652	73.95	▼2.14
Registered electors		234,816		
