= Yancheng District =

Yancheng District may refer to:

- Yancheng District, Kaohsiung (鹽埕區), Republic of China (Taiwan)
- Yancheng District, Luohe (郾城区), Henan, People's Republic of China
