= Kaohsiung City Constituency 4 =

Constituency of the Legislative Yuan of Taiwan

- Single-member constituency for the Legislative Yuan
- District(s): Renwu, Niaosong, Daliao, Linyuan
- Electorate: 270,354 (2024 election)

Current constituency
- Created: 2008 (as Kaohsiung County Constituency 3); 2010 (current name)
- Party: DPP
- Member: Lin Tai-hua

Kaohsiung City Constituency 4 (Chinese: 高雄市第四選舉區) is one of the 73 regional constituencies represented in the Legislative Yuan, the national legislature of Taiwan. It was created in 2008 (as Kaohsiung County Constituency 3) following a series of constitutional reforms, and elects one legislator, through first-past-the-post voting, to the Legislative Yuan. It has been represented by Lin Tai-hua of the Democratic Progressive Party since 2011.

== Legislators ==
Election	Legislator	Party
2008 - 2011	Chen Chi-yu	Democratic Progressive Party
2011	Lin Tai-hua	Democratic Progressive Party

== Election results ==

=== 2008 (Note: Named Kaohsiung County Constituency 3, boundaries unchanged) ===
2008 Taiwanese legislative election: Kaohsiung County 3
Candidate	Party	Votes	%
Chen Chi-yu	Democratic Progressive Party	55,848	45.14
Wu Kuang-hsun	Kuomintang	53,205	43.00
Hsu Ching-huang	Independent	13,158	10.64
Chien Hung-te	Taiwan Farmers' Party	996	0.81
Huang Hsien-nan	Independent	317	0.26
Chien Chia-hung	Independent	199	0.16
Total		123,723	100.00
Valid votes		123,723	98.29
Invalid/blank votes		2,158	1.71
Total votes		125,881	100.00
Registered voters/turnout		217,808	57.79
Majority		2,643	2.14
Democratic Progressive Party win (new seat)			

=== 2011 by-election ===
2011 Legislative Yuan by-election: Kaohsiung 4
Candidate	Party	Votes	%	+/–
Lin Tai-hua	Democratic Progressive Party	53,833	69.69	▲24.55
Hsu Ching-huang	Kuomintang	23,409	30.31	▼12.69
Total		77,242	100.00	–
Valid votes		77,242	99.37	
Invalid/blank votes		488	0.63	
Total votes		77,730	100.00	
Registered voters/turnout		228,805	33.97	
Majority		52,927	30.86	
Democratic Progressive Party hold				

=== 2012 ===
* denotes the incumbent representative

2012 Taiwanese legislative election: Kaohsiung 4
Candidate	Party	Votes	%	+/–
Lin Tai-hua*	Democratic Progressive Party	111,188	64.82	▼4.87
Chiou Yu-shiuan	Kuomintang	58,261	33.96	▲3.65
Huang Hsien-nan	Independent	2,090	1.22	NEW
Total		171,539	100.00	–
Valid votes		171,539	98.47	
Invalid/blank votes		2,665	1.53	
Total votes		174,204	100.00	
Registered voters/turnout		233,078	74.74	
Majority		52,927	30.86	
Democratic Progressive Party hold				

=== 2016 ===
* denotes the incumbent representative

2016 Taiwanese legislative election: Kaohsiung 4
Candidate	Party	Votes	%	+/–
Lin Tai-hua*	Democratic Progressive Party	122,722	75.53	▲10.71
Kuo Lun-hao	Kuomintang	37,711	23.21	▼10.75
Lin Chun-yang	Chinese Unification Promotion Party	2,040	1.26	NEW
Total		162,473	100.00	–
Valid votes		162,473	97.68	
Invalid/blank votes		3,864	2.32	
Total votes		166,337	100.00	
Registered voters/turnout		248,774	66.86	
Majority		61,445	31.2	
Democratic Progressive Party hold				

=== 2020 ===
* denotes the incumbent representative

2020 Taiwanese legislative election: Kaohsiung 4
Candidate	Party	Votes	%	+/–
Lin Tai-hua*	Democratic Progressive Party	118,219	60.03	▼15.5
Hsu Ching-huang	Kuomintang	56,774	28.83	▲5.62
Chou Kai-lun	Independent	11,102	5.64	NEW
Huang Chao-cheng	Taiwan Renewal Party	10,323	5.24	NEW
Sun Peng-yi	Sovereign State for Formosa & Pescadores Party	500	0.25	NEW
Total		196,918	100.00	–
Valid votes		196,918	97.66	
Invalid/blank votes		4,719	2.34	
Total votes		201,637	100.00	
Registered voters/turnout		261,093	77.23	
Majority		61,445	31.2	
Democratic Progressive Party hold				

=== 2024 ===
* denotes the incumbent representative

2024 Taiwanese legislative election: Kaohsiung 4
Candidate	Party	Votes	%	+/–
Lin Tai-hua*	Democratic Progressive Party	121,001	65.31	▲5.28
Chen Jo-tsui	Kuomintang	64,261	34.69	▲5.86
Total		185,262	100.00	–
Valid votes		185,262	96.96	
Invalid/blank votes		5,802	3.04	
Total votes		191,064	100.00	
Registered voters/turnout		270,354	70.67	
Majority		56,740	30.62	
Democratic Progressive Party hold				
