= Kaohsiung City Constituency 8 (2020) =

Constituency of the Legislative Yuan of Taiwan

- Single-member constituency for the Legislative Yuan
- District(s): Qianzhen, Qijin, Xiaogang
- Electorate: 302,464 (2024 election)

Current constituency
- Created: 2020
- Party: DPP
- Member: Lai Jui-lung

Kaohsiung City Constituency 8 (Chinese: 高雄市第八選舉區) is one of the 73 regional constituencies represented in the Legislative Yuan, the national legislature of Taiwan. It was created in 2020 following boundary changes across Taiwan, and elects one legislator, through first-past-the-post voting, to the Legislative Yuan. It has been represented by Lai Jui-lung of the Democratic Progressive Party since 2020.

== Legislators ==
Election	Legislator	Party
2020	Jai Jui-lung	Democratic Progressive Party

== Election results ==

=== 2020 ===
2020 Taiwanese legislative election: Kaohsiung 8
Candidate	Party	Votes	%
Jai Jui-lung	Democratic Progressive Party	135,052	57.73
Chen Li-na	Kuomintang	83,148	35.54
Ao Po-sheng	Taiwan People's Party	14,043	6.00
Tsai Ma-fu	Interfaith Union	1,710	0.73
Total		233,953	100.00
Valid votes		233,953	98.68
Invalid/blank votes		3,135	1.32
Total votes		237,088	100.00
Registered voters/turnout		305,923	77.50
Majority		51,914	22.19
Democratic Progressive Party win (new seat)			

=== 2024 ===
* denotes the incumbent representative

2024 Taiwanese legislative election: Kaohsiung 8
Candidate	Party	Votes	%	+/–
Jai Jui-lung	Democratic Progressive Party	121,064	57.75	▲0.02
Li Ming-hsuan	Kuomintang	82,602	39.40	▲3.86
Li Cheng-hsien	Judicial Revolution Party	3,087	1.47	NEW
Chan Hsiu-ying	Labor Party	2,876	1.37	NEW
Total		209,629	100.00	–
Valid votes		209,629	96.76	
Invalid/blank votes		7,014	3.24	
Total votes		216,643	100.00	
Registered voters/turnout		302,464	71.63	
Majority		38,462	18.34	
Democratic Progressive Party hold				
