= Mituo District =

District in Kaohsiung, Taiwan

Coordinates: 22.780138°N 120.239841°E

Mituo 彌陀區
- District
- Mituo District
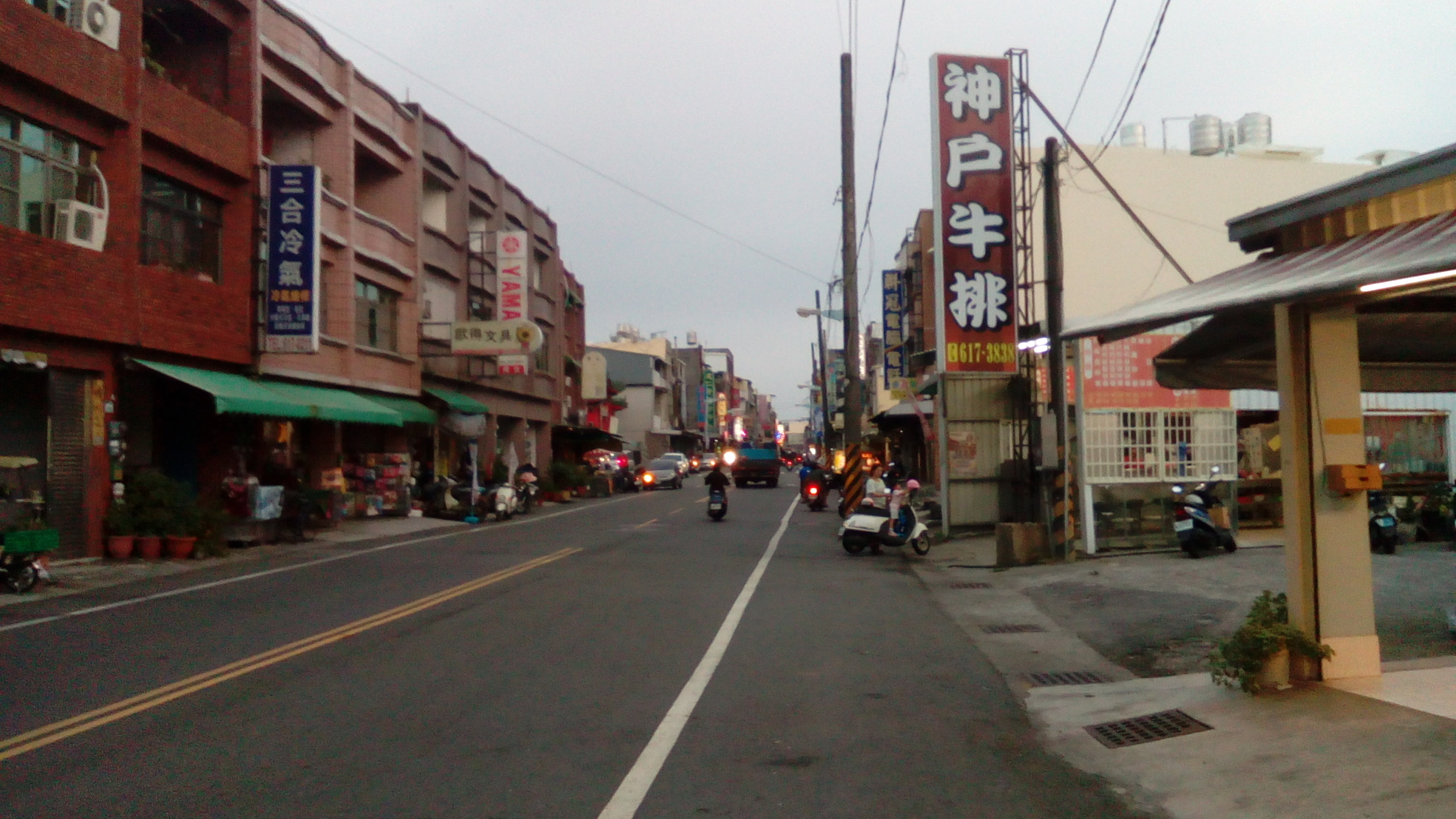

- Mituo District in Kaohsiung City
- Country: Taiwan
- Region: Southern Taiwan

Population (October 2023)
  - Total: 18,322
- Website: mituo-en.kcg.gov.tw

Mituo District (Chinese: 彌陀區; pinyin: Mítuó Qū; Pe̍h-ōe-jī: Mî-tô-khu/Bî-lô-khu/Mî-lô-khu) is a rural district of Kaohsiung City in southern Taiwan.

== History ==
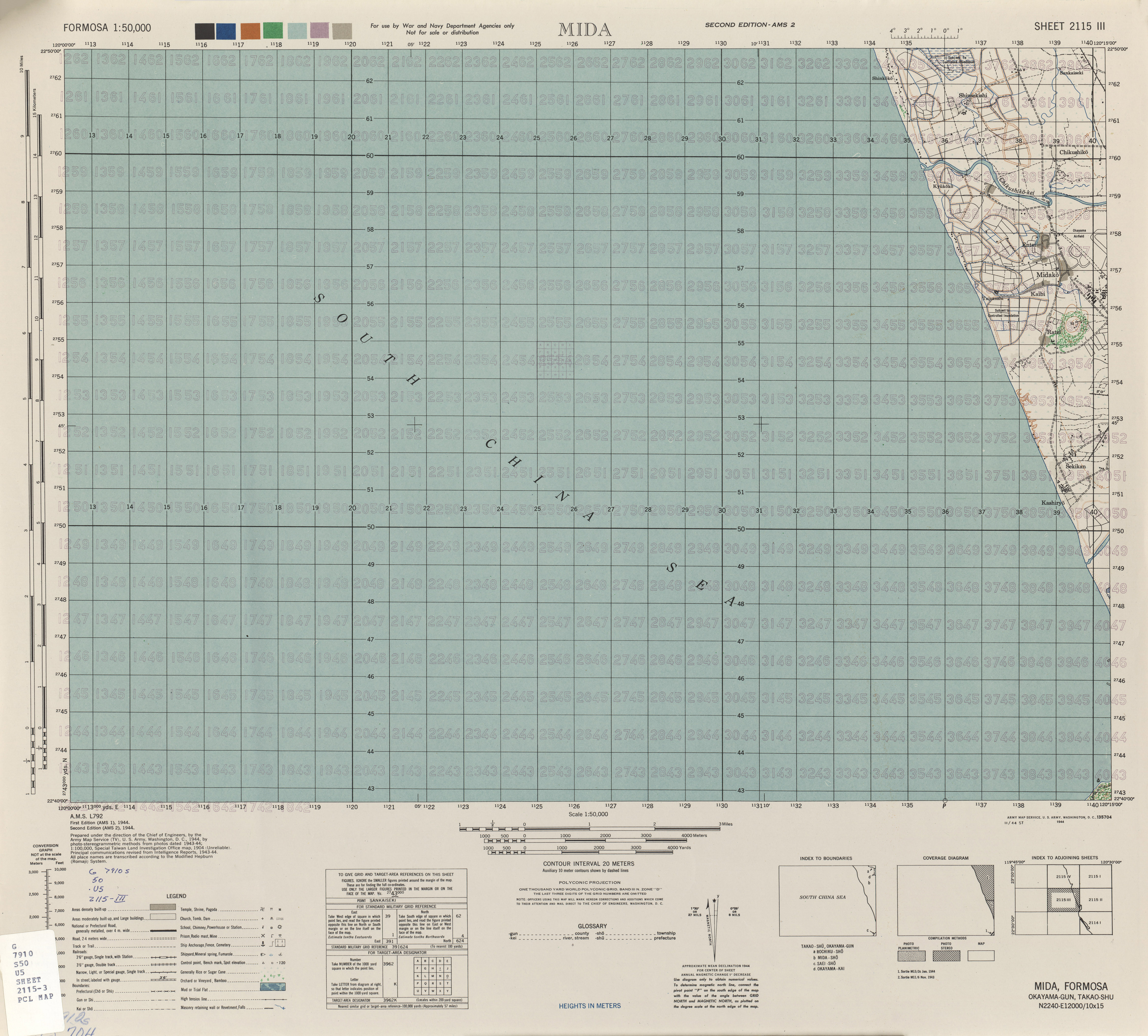
Map of Mituo (labeled as Midakō) and surrounding area (1944)

This district was formerly called Bilokang (Chinese: 彌陀港; Pe̍h-ōe-jī: Bî-lô-káng)

=== Republic of China ===
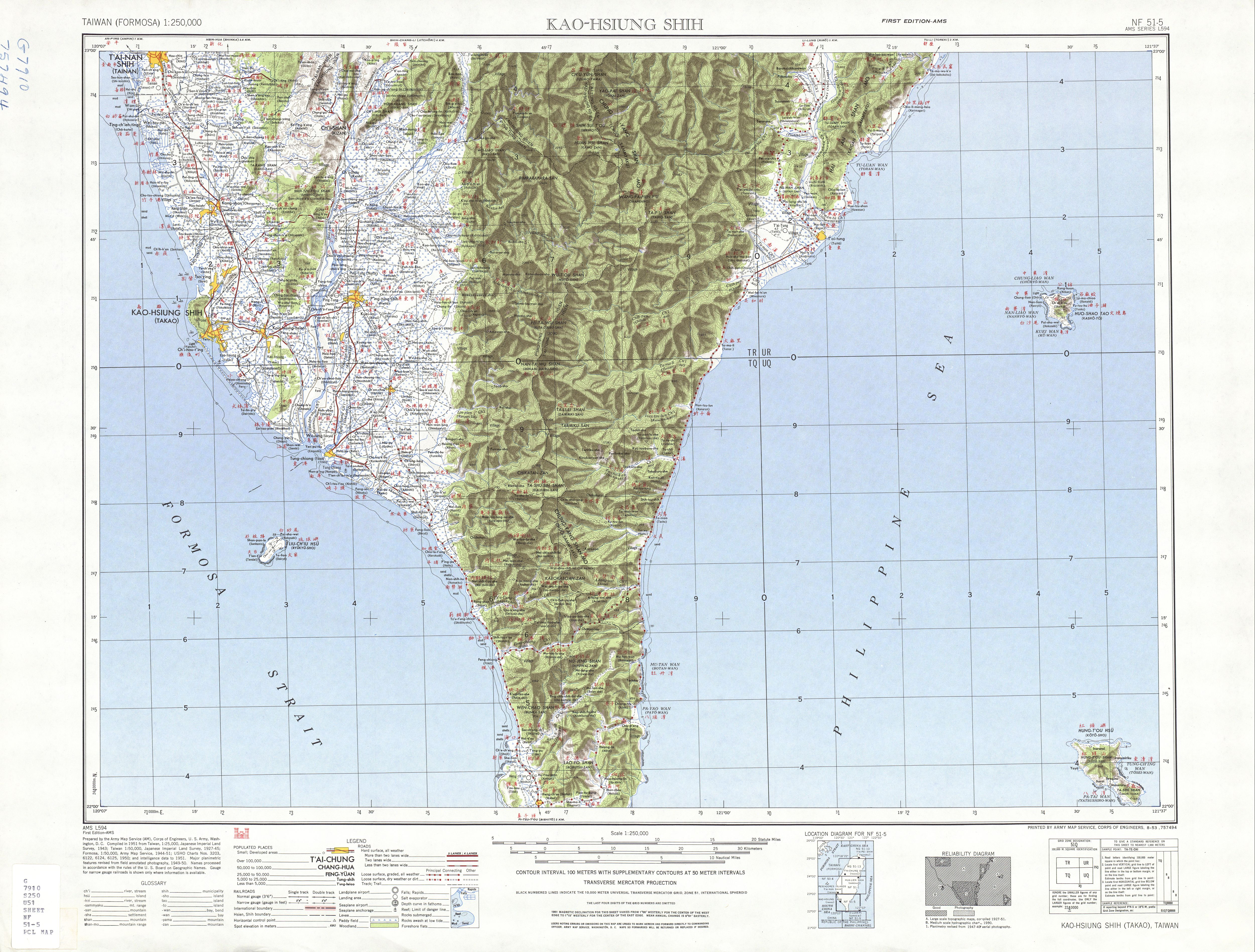
Map including Mituo (labeled as Mit'o (Mida) 弥陀) (1951)

After the handover of Taiwan from Japan to the Republic of China in 1945, Mituo was organized as a rural township of Kaohsiung County. On 25 December 2010, Kaohsiung County was merged with Kaohsiung City and Mituo was upgraded to a district of the city.

== Administrative divisions ==
The district consists of Guanghe, Mijing, Miren, Mishou, Mituo, Jiugang, Wenan, Yancheng, Guogang, Haiwei, Tade and Nanliao Village.

== Politics ==
The district is part of Kaohsiung City Constituency II electoral district for Legislative Yuan.

== Tourist attractions ==
- Mi-shou Temple (彌壽宮)
- Mituo Coastal Recreation Area
- Mituo Gold Coast
- Mituo Park
- Nanliao Fishing Harbor
- Nanliao Seaside Lightspot
- Wu Family Swallow Tail Old House

== Notable natives ==
- Tu Cheng-sheng, Minister of Education (2004-2008)

== See also ==
- Kaohsiung
