= Taoyuan City Constituency 5 =

Constituency of the Legislative Yuan of Taiwan

- Single-member constituency for the Legislative Yuan
- District(s): Pingzhen & Longtan

Current constituency
- Created: 2008
- Member(s): Helen Chu Feng-chih (2008–2012); Lu Yu-lin (2012–)

Taoyuan City Constituency 5 (Chinese: 桃園市第五選舉區; pinyin: Táoyuán Shì Dì-wǔ Xuǎnjǔ Qū) includes Pingzhen and Longtan in southern Taoyuan City. The district was formerly known as Taoyuan County Constituency 5 (2008-2014) and was created in 2008, when all local constituencies of the Legislative Yuan were reorganized to become single-member districts.

== Current district ==
- Pingzhen
- Longtan

== Legislators ==
Representative	Party	Dates	Notes
Chu Fong-chi	Kuomintang	2008–2012	
Lu Yu-lin	Kuomintang	2012–	Incumbent

== Election results ==
=== 2016 ===
Legislative Election 2016: Taoyuan City Constituency 5
Party	Candidate	Votes	%	±%
Kuomintang	Lu Yu-lin	72,965	43.86	
Democratic Progressive	Chang Chao-liang	70,202	42.20	
Minkuotang	Zhang Cheng	17,956	10.79	
Independent	Huang Zhihao	3,517	2.11	
Others	Huang Guohua	877	0.53	
Independent	Xiao Jialiang	841	0.51	
Majority		2,763	1.66	
Total valid votes		166,358	98.01	
Rejected ballots		3,374	1.99	
Kuomintang hold		Swing		
Turnout		169,732	67.14	
Registered electors		252,796		

=== 2024 ===
Legislative Election 2024: Taoyuan City Constituency 5
Party	Candidate	Votes	%	±%
Kuomintang	Lu Yu-Ling	89,372	43.88	
Democratic Progressive	Liu Jen Chao	69,022	33.89	
People's	Lai Hsiang-Ling	43,691	21.45	
Judicial Reform Party	Yi Nai-Wen	1,580	0.78	
Majority		20,350	9.99	
Total valid votes		203,665		
Kuomintang hold		Swing		
