= Lee Kun-tse =

Taiwanese politician

Lee Kun-tse MLY
- 李昆澤
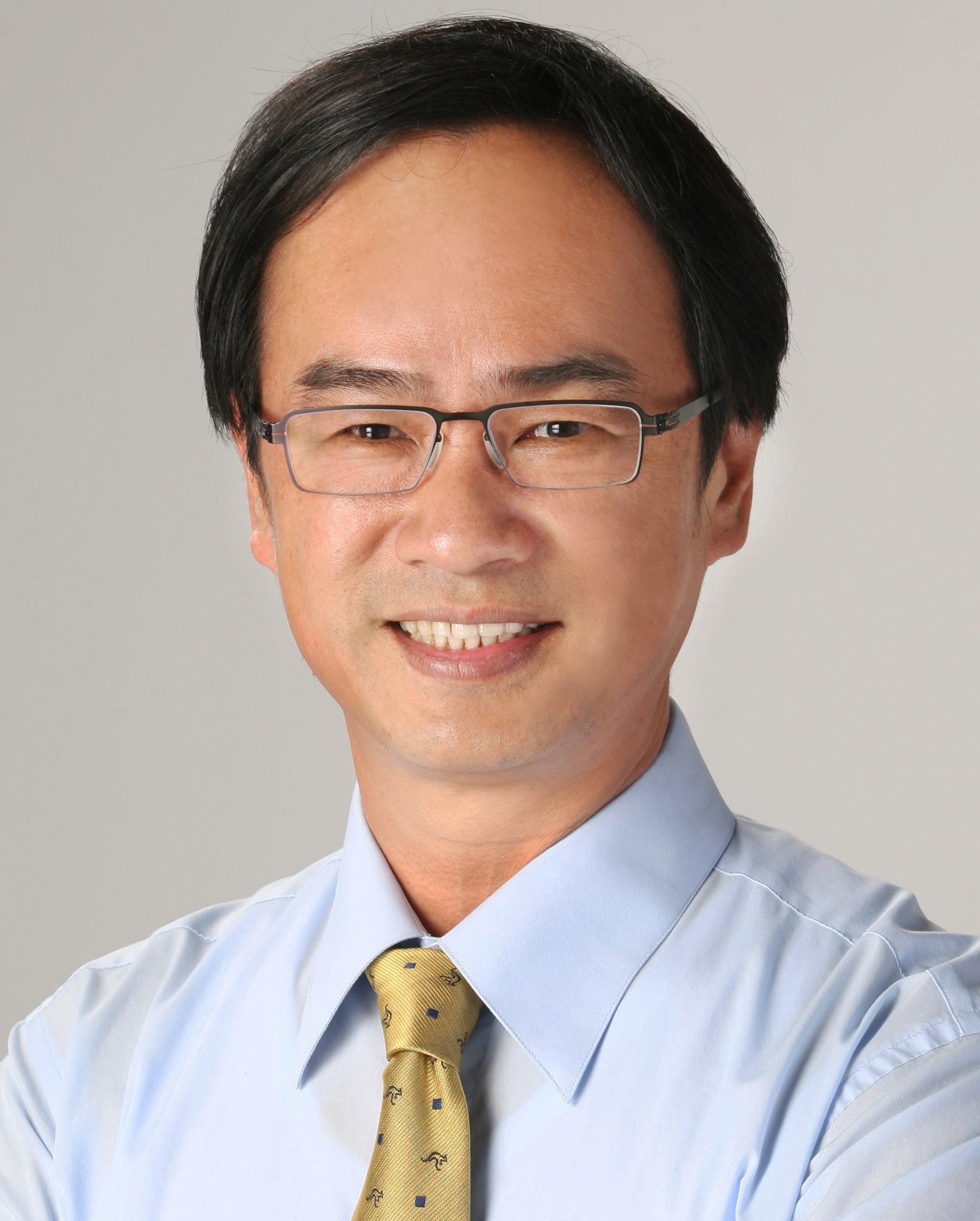
- Official portrait, 2012

Member of the Legislative Yuan
- Incumbent
- Assumed office 1 February 2012
- Preceded by: Hou Tsai-feng (8th)
- Constituency: Kaohsiung VI (8–10th; 2012–2020); Kaohsiung V (10–11th; 2020–)
- In office 1 February 2005 – 1 February 2008
- Preceded by: Chen Chi-mai
- Succeeded by: Redistricting; Chung Shao-ho
- Constituency: Kaohsiung I

Kaohsiung City Councillor
- In office 25 December 2002 – 31 January 2005
- Constituency: Sanmin

Member of the National Assembly
- In office 20 May 1996 – 20 May 2000
- Constituency: Kaohsiung I

Personal details
- Born: 29 April 1964 (age 62) Kaohsiung, Taiwan
- Party: Democratic Progressive Party
- Relatives: Chen Chu (aunt)
- Education: Fu Jen Catholic University (BA); National Sun Yat-sen University (MA); National Kaohsiung University of Science and Technology (PhD)

Lee Kun-tse (Chinese: 李昆澤; born 29 April 1964) is a Taiwanese politician currently serving as a member of the Legislative Yuan. A member of the New Tide faction of the Democratic Progressive Party (DPP), he has served five terms in the Legislative Yuan and one term in the Kaohsiung City Council. He is a former member of the Central Standing Committee of the DPP.

== Education ==
Lee graduated from the Department of History at Fu Jen Catholic University and later earned a master's degree in political science from National Sun Yat-sen University. He then earned a Ph.D. in international business from the National Kaohsiung University of Science and Technology.

== Political career ==
From 2002 to 2005, Lee was a councilor of Kaohsiung City Council. Since 2020, he has been a member of the Legislative Yuan.

== Honor ==
Lee was named an Outstanding Legislator by Citizens' Congressional Watch for 22 consecutive terms.
