= Taoyuan City Constituency 4 =

Constituency of the Legislative Yuan of Taiwan

- Single-member constituency for the Legislative Yuan
- District(s): parts of Taoyuan

Current constituency
- Created: 2008
- Member(s): Yang Li-huan (2008–2016); Cheng Pao-ching (2016–2020); Wan Mei-ling (2020–)

Taoyuan City Constituency 4 (Chinese: 桃園市第四選舉區; pinyin: Táoyuán Shì Dì-sì Xuǎnjǔ Qū) includes most of Taoyuan District in Taoyuan City. The district was formerly known as Taoyuan County Constituency 4 (2008-2014) and was created in 2008, when all local constituencies of the Legislative Yuan were reorganized to become single-member districts.

== Current district ==
- Taoyuan:
  - urban villages (66 in total): Zhonglu(中路里), Tong'an(同安里), Fu'an(福安里), Zhongning(中寧里), Chenggong(成功里), Xinguang(信光里),
    Fulin(福林里), Zhongde(中德里), Ziqiang(自強里), Nanmen(南門里), Longshan(龍山里), Dalin(大林里), Dashu(大樹里), Zhongxing(中興里),
    Ximen(西門里), Nanpu(南埔里), Long'an(龍安里), Wenzhong(文中里), Xipu(西埔里), Nanhua(南華里), Longgang(龍岡里), Dafeng(大豐里), Wenhua(文化里), Xihu(西湖里),
    Jianguo(建國里), Longxiang(龍祥里), Zhongshan(中山里), Wenchang(文昌里), Longfeng(龍鳳里), Zhongping(中平里), Wenming(文明里),
    Taishan(泰山里), Fenglin(豐林里), Zhongzheng(中正里), Beimen(北門里), Dongshan(東山里), Zhuangjing(莊敬里), Zhongcheng(中成里),
    Beipu(北埔里), Dongmen(東門里), Zhaoyang(朝陽里), Baoqing(寶慶里), Zhonghe(中和里), Minsheng(民生里), Dongpu(東埔里), Yunlin(雲林里),
    Zhongxin(中信里), Yong'an(永安里), Wuling(武陵里), Ciwen(慈文里), Zhongyuan(中原里), Yingxing(永興里), Chang'an(長安里), Xinpu(新埔里), Zhongpu(中埔里), Yushan(玉山里), Changmei(長美里),
    Zhongtai(中泰里), Guangxing(光興里), Changde(長德里), Tongde(同德里), Mingde(明德里), Ruiqing(瑞慶里), Bao'an(寶安里), Zhongsheng(中聖里), Longshou(龍壽里)

== Legislators ==
Representative	Party	Dates	Notes
Yang Li-huan	Kuomintang	2008–2016	
Cheng Pao-ching	Democratic Progressive Party	2016–2020	
Wan Mei-Ling	Kuomintang	2020–	Incumbent

== Election results ==
=== 2016 ===
Legislative Election 2016: Taoyuan City Constituency 4
Party	Candidate	Votes	%	±%
Democratic Progressive	Cheng Pao-ching	86,389	50.05	+9.40
Kuomintang	Yang Li-huan	86,220	49.95	–8.25
Majority		169	0.10	
Total valid votes		172,609	98.32	
Rejected ballots		2,949	1.68	
Democratic Progressive gain from Kuomintang		Swing	+8.82	
Turnout		175,558	67.06	–8.16
Registered electors		261,773		

=== 2024 ===
Legislative Election 2024: Taoyuan City Constituency 4
Party	Candidate	Votes	%	±%
Kuomintang	Wan Mei-Ling	119,430	55.46	
Democratic Progressive	Fan Kang-Hsiang	83,183	38.63	
Independent	Hwang Min-Li	9,426	4.38	
Taiwan Nationalist Party	Kan Ni Di	3,293	1.53	
Majority		36,247	16.83	
Total valid votes		215,332		
Kuomintang hold		Swing		
