= Lin I-chin =

Taiwanese politician (born 1969)

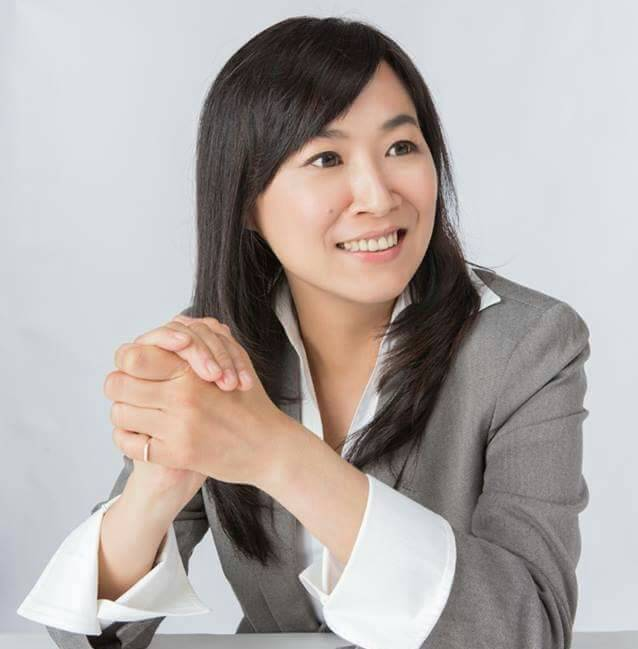
Lin in 2014

Lin I-chin (Chinese: 林宜瑾; born 25 August 1969) is a Taiwanese politician.

== Early life and education ==
Lin was born in Tainan on 25 August 1969. After graduating from the National Tainan Chia-Chi Senior High School, Lin enrolled in the Department of Sociology within Soochow University. She later earned a master's degree in political economy at National Cheng Kung University.

== Political career ==
Lin participated in the Wild Lily student movement and successively worked with political figures associated with the Democratic Progressive Party, such as Lin Yi-hsiung, William Lai, Chen Shui-bian, and Tsai Ing-wen. Between 1998 and 2010, Lin served on the Tainan County Council. From 2010 to 2020, she was a member of the succeeding body, the Tainan City Council. In January 2020, Lin was elected to the 10th Legislative Yuan, representing Tainan's fourth constituency. In November 2020, Lin commented on fake news disseminated by CTi News. In July 2022, she discussed the nuances of euthanasia in Taiwan. In August 2022, Lin visited legislative counterparts in Germany.
