= Hsu Chih-chieh =

Taiwanese politician

Hsu Chih-chieh MLY
- 許智傑
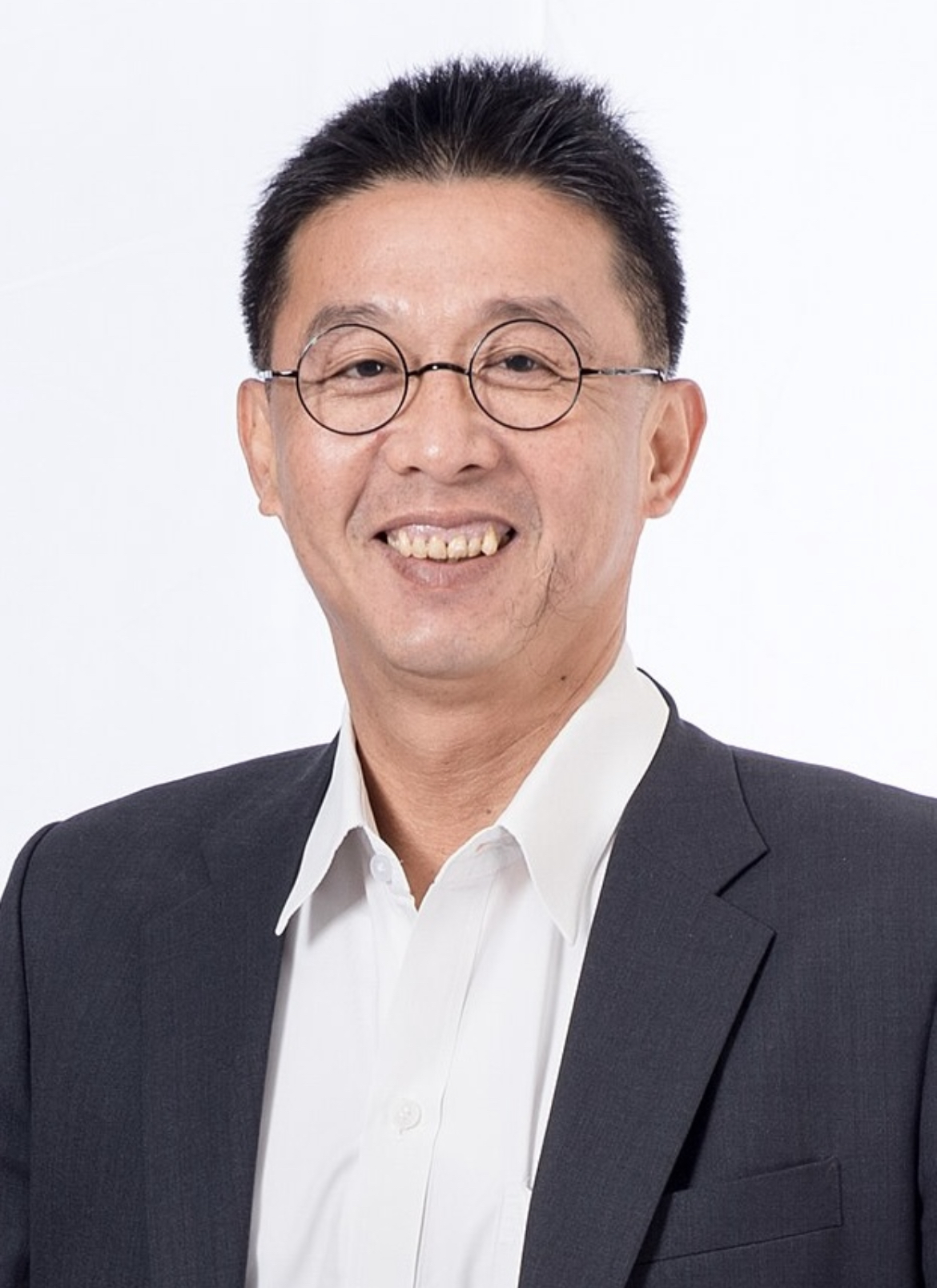

Member of the Legislative Yuan
- Incumbent
- Assumed office 20 February 2020
- Preceded by: Chao Tien-lin
- Constituency: Kaohsiung City 7th
- In office 1 February 2012 – 20 February 2020
- Preceded by: Chiang Ling-chun
- Succeeded by: Lin Yi-hua
- Constituency: Kaohsiung City 8th

Personal details
- Born: 5 January 1966 (age 60) Xingang, Chiayi County, Taiwan
- Party: Democratic Progressive Party
- Education: National Taiwan University (BS); National Kaohsiung Normal University (MEd, DEd)

Hsu Chih-chieh (Chinese: 許智傑; pinyin: Xǔ Zhìjié; Wade–Giles: Hsü Chih-chieh) is a Taiwanese politician. He is member of the Democratic Progressive Party and a two-term legislator in the Legislative Yuan.

== Education ==
After graduating from Kaohsiung Municipal Kaohsiung Senior High School, Hsu earned a bachelor's degree in mechanical engineering from National Taiwan University. He then earned a master's degree in education in 1996 and a Doctor of Education (D.Ed.) in 2013, both from National Kaohsiung Normal University.

== See also ==
- List of members of the eighth Legislative Yuan
