= 2020 Taiwanese legislative election =

National election

- 11 January 2020

All 113 seats in the Legislative Yuan 57 seats needed for a majority
- Turnout: 74.93% (Note: District and aboriginal electorate; party-list voter turnout was 74.86%) (▲7.59pp)
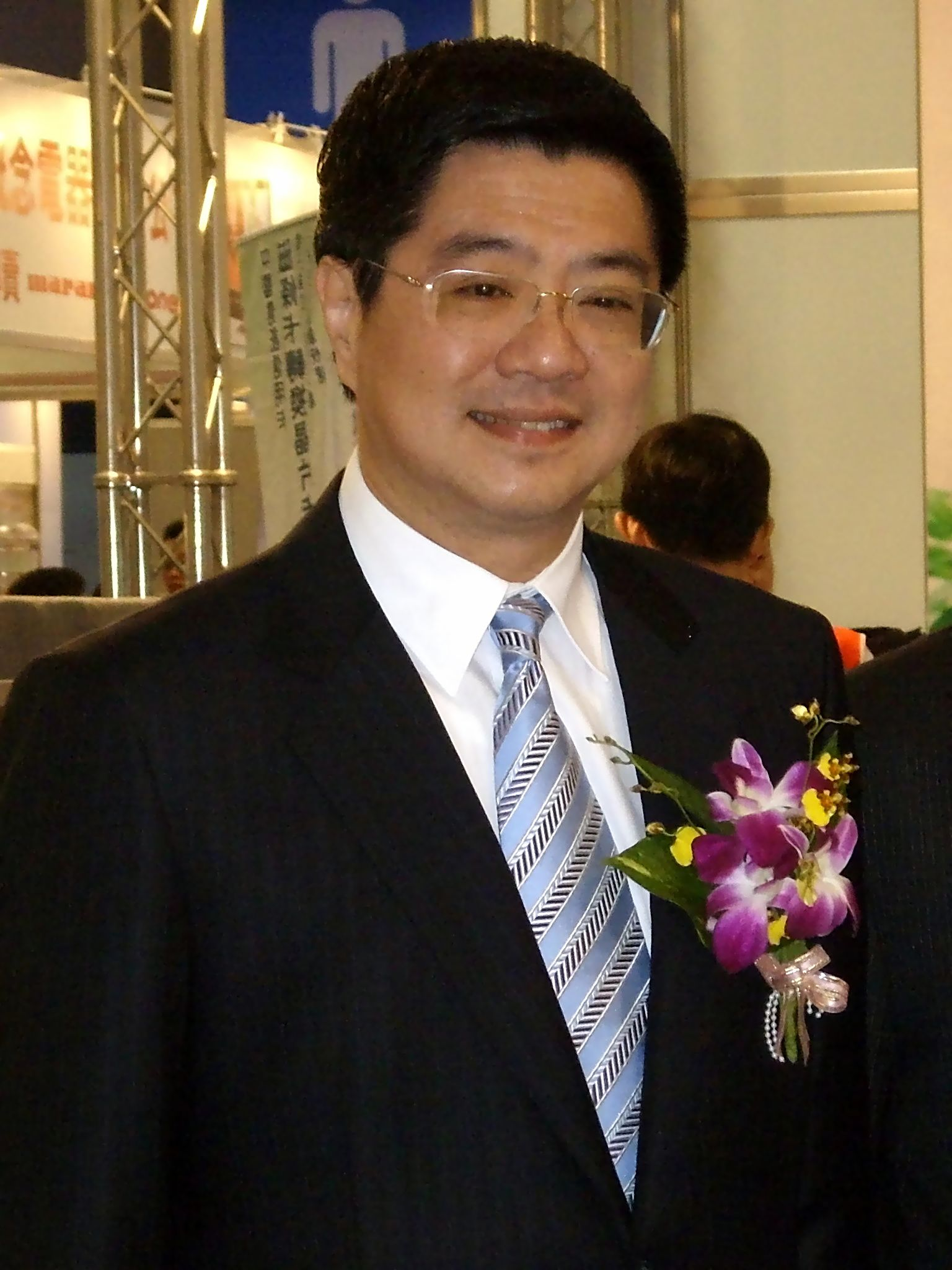

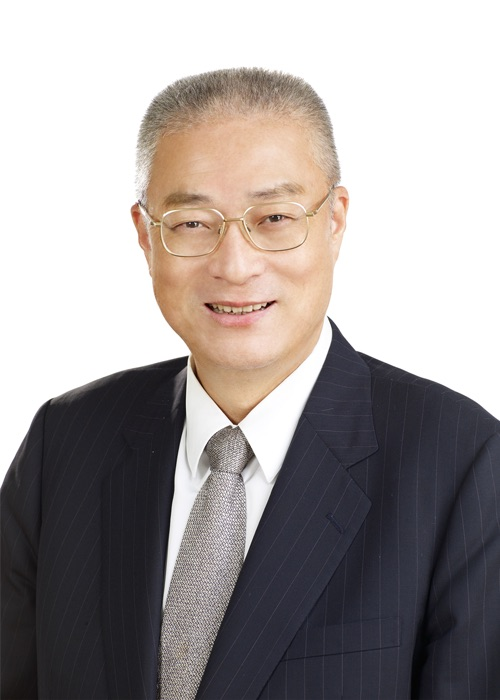

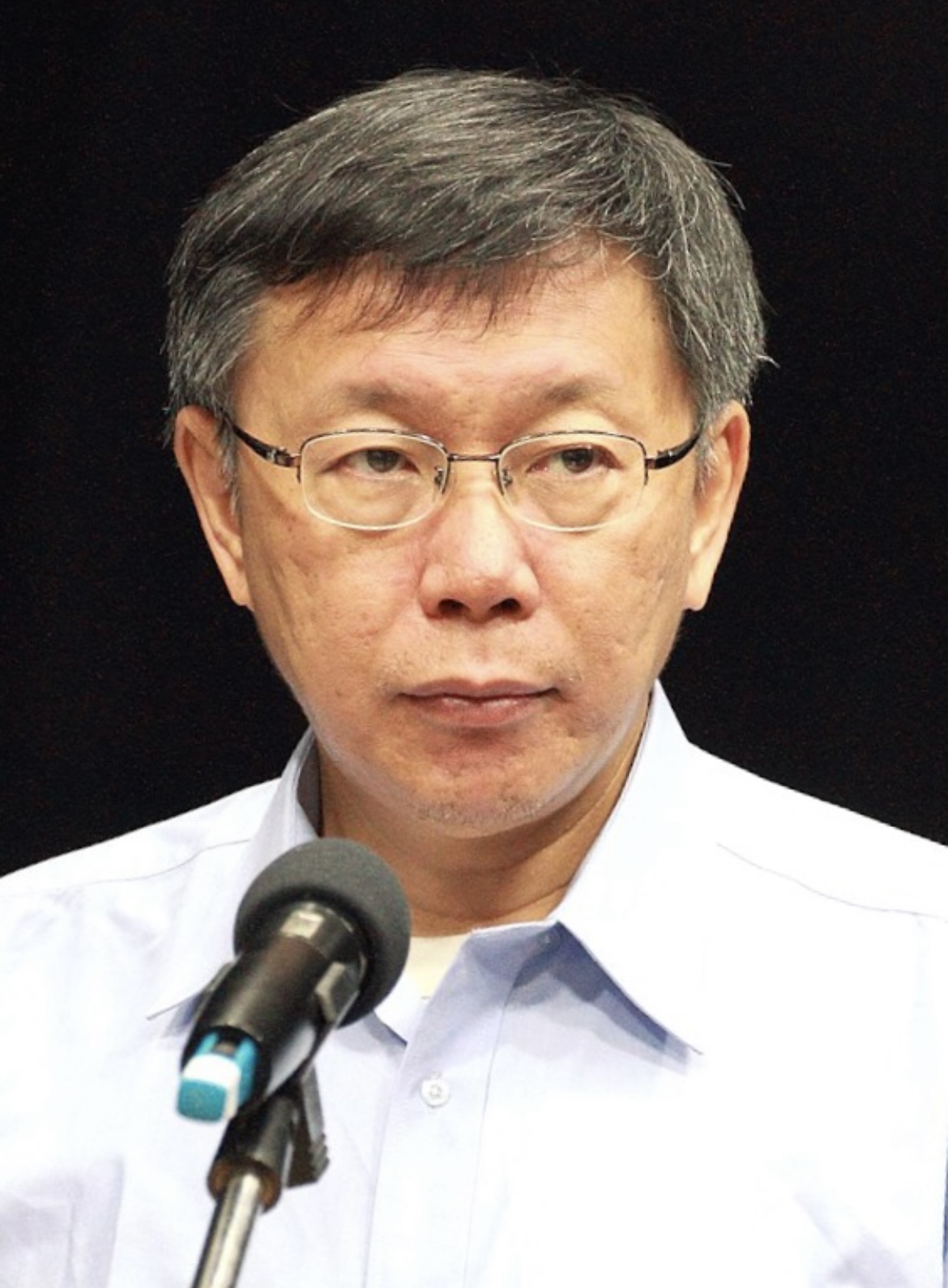

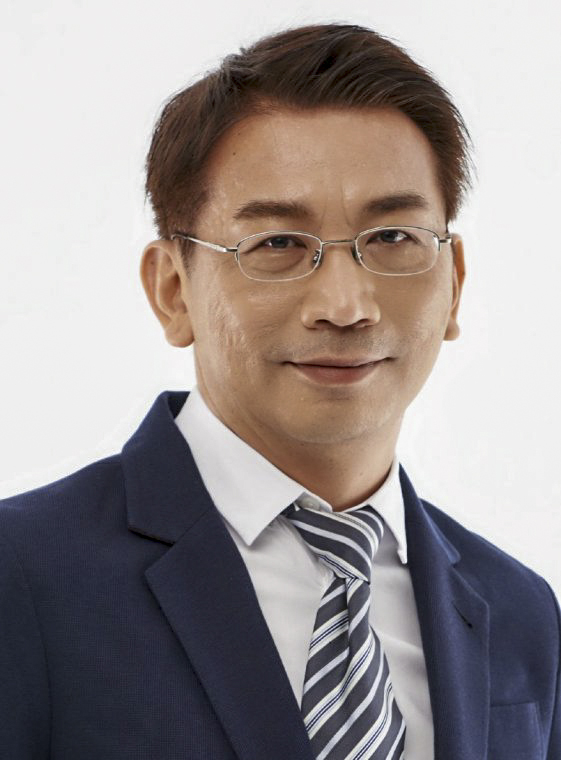
	Majority party	Minority party
Leader	Cho Jung-tai	Wu Den-yih
Party	DPP	KMT
Last election	68 seats, 44.06%	35 seats, 26.91%
Seats won	61	38
Seat change	▼7	▲3
Constituency vote	6,383,783; 45.11% ▲0.52pp	5,761,995; 40.71% ▲1.82pp
Party vote	4,811,241; 33.98% ▼10.10pp	4,723,504; 33.36% ▲6.45pp
	Third party	Fourth party
Leader	Ko Wen-je	Hsu Yung-ming
Party	TPP	NPP
Last election	Did not exist	5 seats, 6.11%
Seats won	5	3
Seat change	New	▼2
Constituency vote	264,478; 1.87% New	141,952; 1.00% ▼1.89pp
Party vote	1,588,806; 11.22% New	1,098,100; 7.75% ▼1.64pp

- Election cartogram
President before election
Su Jia-chyuan
DPP
Elected President
Yu Shyi-kun
DPP

Legislative elections were held in Taiwan on 11 January 2020 to elect the 113 members of the Legislative Yuan. The elections were held concurrently with presidential elections. The term of the Legislative Yuan began on 1 February 2020.

The Democratic Progressive Party (DPP) lost seven seats but retained a majority of 61 seats in the Legislative Yuan. The Kuomintang gained three seats, winning 38. The New Power Party won three seats, down from five in the last election. The Taiwan People's Party and Taiwan Statebuilding Party entered the Legislative Yuan with five seats and one seat, respectively, with five independent candidates winning their seats and the People First Party losing all of their seats.

== Electoral system ==
Members were elected by parallel voting. 73 members were elected by first-past-the-post, 6 reserved for indigenous candidates by single non-transferable vote, and 34 by party-list proportional representation.

=== Constituency changes ===
In 2019, after negotiations between the Presidents of the Executive and Legislative Yuans, changes to the electoral divisions include:

- Kaoshiung and Pingtung each lost a seat.
- Tainan and Hsinchu County each gained a seat.
- The boundary between Taichung II and Taichung VII was adjusted.

== Contesting parties and candidates ==
Party	General seats	Aboriginal seats	Party list	Total
Democratic Progressive Party	67	2	33	102
Kuomintang	71	5	31	107
Taiwan People's Party	17	－	28	45
New Power Party	5	－	11	16
Taiwan Statebuilding Party	10	－	6	16
People First Party	10	－	22	32
Green Party	10	1	6	17
New Party	－	－	10	10
Taiwan Action Party Alliance	11	－	5	16
Stabilizing Force Party	9	2	10	21
Taiwan Solidarity Union	－	－	7	7
Congress Party Alliance	13	－	6	19
Chinese Unification Promotion Party	10	－	7	17
Interfaith Union	12	－	8	20
Formosa Alliance	10	2	6	18
Labor Party	10	－	2	12
United Action Alliance	10	2	8	20
Taiwan Renewal Party	11	1	6	18
Sovereign State for Formosa & Pescadores Party	9	1	4	14
Taiwan Labor Party	3	－	－	3
Independent	86	5	－	91
Others	26	0	0	26
Total	410	21	216	647

== Opinion polling ==
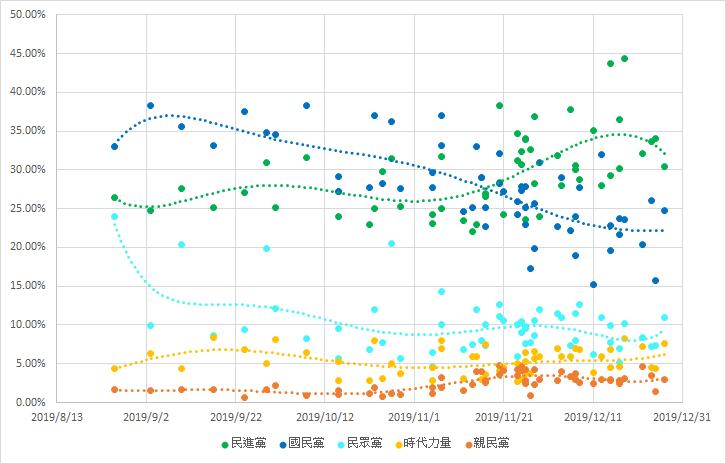

== Results ==
Party	Party-list			Constituency/Aboriginal			Total seats	+/–
Party	Votes	%	Seats	Votes	%	Seats	Total seats	+/–
Democratic Progressive Party	4,811,241	33.98	13	6,383,783	45.11	48	61	–7
Kuomintang	4,723,504	33.36	13	5,761,995	40.71	25	38	+3
Taiwan People's Party	1,588,806	11.22	5	264,478	1.87	0	5	New
New Power Party	1,098,100	7.75	3	141,952	1.00	0	3	–2
People First Party	518,921	3.66	0	60,614	0.43	0	0	–3
Taiwan Statebuilding Party	447,286	3.16	0	141,503	1.00	1	1	New
Green Party Taiwan	341,465	2.41	0	39,387	0.28	0	0	0
New Party	147,373	1.04	0				0	0
Taiwan Action Party Alliance	143,617	1.01	0	20,134	0.14	0	0	New
Stabilizing Force Party	94,563	0.67	0	28,696	0.20	0	0	New
Taiwan Solidarity Union	50,435	0.36	0				0	0
Congress Party Alliance	40,331	0.28	0	81,508	0.58	0	0	New
Chinese Unification Promotion Party	32,966	0.23	0	8,790	0.06	0	0	0
Interfaith Union	31,117	0.22	0	7,702	0.05	0	0	0
Formosa Alliance	29,324	0.21	0	12,742	0.09	0	0	New
Labor Party	19,941	0.14	0	13,694	0.10	0	0	0
United Action Alliance	17,515	0.12	0	15,846	0.11	0	0	New
Taiwan Renewal Party	11,952	0.08	0	41,891	0.30	0	0	New
Sovereign State for Formosa & Pescadores Party	11,681	0.08	0	6,063	0.04	0	0	New
Taiwan Animal Protection Party				7,660	0.05	0	0	New
Chinese Women's Party				3,507	0.02	0	0	New
Judicial Justice Party				3,336	0.02	0	0	New
Labour Party				2,451	0.02	0	0	New
Taiwan Revolutionary Party				2,088	0.01	0	0	New
Taiwan Labor Party				2,041	0.01	0	0	0
Cheng Hua Chao Sheng Dang				1,999	0.01	0	0	New
People's Democratic Party				1,870	0.01	0	0	New
Taiwan Motive Force Party				1,356	0.01	0	0	New
Chinese Culture Revival Party				1,296	0.01	0	0	New
Taiwan Independence Party				939	0.01	0	0	0
Kinmen Kao-Liang Party				899	0.01	0	0	New
Positive Party				623	0.00	0	0	New
Tianzhou Peaceful Unity Family Party				574	0.00	0	0	New
Chinese Peace Unification Party				570	0.00	0	0	New
Taiwan Public Interest Party				534	0.00	0	0	New
Round Party				488	0.00	0	0	New
Chinese New Inhabitant Party				428	0.00	0	0	New
Min Sheng Gong Yi				417	0.00	0	0	New
Taiwan Manipulative Therapist Union Labour Party				366	0.00	0	0	New
Deaf Nation Party				352	0.00	0	0	New
Cheng Hua United Party				306	0.00	0	0	New
Free Speech Coalition				290	0.00	0	0	New
Hsing Chung Ting Meng Hui				155	0.00	0	0	New
Chung Hua Ai Kuo Tung Hsin Dang				134	0.00	0	0	New
Chinese Production Party				112	0.00	0	0	0
Independents				1,086,463	7.68	5	5	+4
Total	14,160,138	100.00	34	14,152,032	100.00	79	113	0
Valid votes	14,160,138	97.95		14,152,032	98.26			
Invalid/blank votes	296,155	2.05		250,043	1.74			
Total votes	14,456,293	100.00		14,402,075	100.00			
Registered voters/turnout	19,312,105	74.86		19,221,861	74.93			
Source: CEC, Election Study Center

=== By constituency ===
Constituency		Result	Elected member	Constituency		Result	Elected member
New Taipei City	I	Kuomintang gain from DPP	Hung Mong-kai	Taipei City	I	DPP hold	Rosalia Wu
New Taipei City	II	DPP hold	Lin Shu-fen	Taipei City	II	DPP hold	Ho Chih-wei
New Taipei City	III	DPP hold	Yu Tian	Taipei City	III	Kuomintang hold	Chiang Wan-an
New Taipei City	IV	DPP hold	Wu Ping-jui	Taipei City	IV	DPP gain from Kuomintang	Kao Chia-yu
New Taipei City	V	DPP hold	Su Chiao-hui	Taipei City	V	Independent hold (Note: Previously elected in 2020 as a member of New Power Party)	Freddy Lim
New Taipei City	VI	DPP hold	Chang Hung-lu	Taipei City	VI	Kuomintang hold	Lin Yi-hua
New Taipei City	VII	DPP hold	Lo Chih-cheng	Taipei City	VII	Kuomintang hold	Fai Hrong-tai
New Taipei City	VIII	DPP hold	Chiang Yung-chang	Taipei City	VIII	Kuomintang hold	Lai Shyh-bao
New Taipei City	IX	Kuomintang hold	Lin Te-fu	Taipei City	–	–	–
New Taipei City	X	DPP hold	Wu Chi-ming	Taipei City	–	–	–
New Taipei City	XI	Kuomintang hold	Lo Ming-tsai	Taipei City	–	–	–
New Taipei City	XII	DPP gain from New Power	Lai Pin-yu	Taipei City	–	–	–
Taoyuan City	I	DPP hold	Cheng Yun-peng	Taichung City	I	DPP hold	Tsai Chi-chang
Taoyuan City	II	DPP hold	Huang Shier-chieh	Taichung City	II	Statebuilding gain from Kuomintang in redrawn constituency	Chen Po-wei
Taoyuan City	III	Kuomintang hold	Lu Ming-che	Taichung City	III	Kuomintang gain from New Power	Yang Chiung-ying
Taoyuan City	IV	Kuomintang gain from DPP	Wan Mei-ling	Taichung City	IV	DPP hold	Chang Liao Wan-chien
Taoyuan City	V	Kuomintang hold	Lu Yu-ling	Taichung City	V	DPP gain from Kuomintang	Zhuang Ching-cheng
Taoyuan City	VI	Independent hold	Chao Cheng-yu	Taichung City	VI	DPP hold	Huang Kuo-shu
Taoyuan City	–	–	–	Taichung City	VII	DPP hold in redrawn constituency	Ho Hsin-chun
Taoyuan City	–	–	–	Taichung City	VIII	Kuomintang hold	Johnny Chiang
Tainan City	I	DPP hold in redrawn constituency	Lai Huei-yuen	Kaohsiung City (Note: Number of seats reduced by one; all seats previously held by DPP)	I	DPP hold	Chiu Yi-ying
Tainan City	II	DPP hold in redrawn constituency	Kuo Kuo-wen	Kaohsiung City	II	DPP hold	Chiu Chih-wei
Tainan City	III	DPP hold in redrawn constituency	Chen Ting-fei	Kaohsiung City	III	DPP hold	Liu Shyh-fang
Tainan City	IV	DPP gain new seat	Lin I-chin	Kaohsiung City	IV	DPP hold	Lin Tai-hua
Tainan City	V	DPP hold in redrawn constituency	Lin Jun-xian	Kaohsiung City	V	DPP hold in redrawn constituency	Lee Kun-tse
Tainan City	VI	DPP hold in redrawn constituency	Wang Ting-yu	Kaohsiung City	VI	DPP hold in redrawn constituency	Chao Tien-lin
Tainan City	–	–	–	Kaohsiung City	VII	DPP hold	Hsu Chih-chieh
Tainan City	–	–	–	Kaohsiung City	VIII	DPP hold in redrawn constituency	Lai Jui-lung
Yilan County		DPP hold	Chen Ou-po	Hsinchu County	I	Kuomintang hold in redrawn constituency	Lin Wei-chou
Yilan County		DPP hold	Chen Ou-po	Hsinchu County	II	Kuomintang gain new seat	Lin Si-ming
Miaoli County	I	Kuomintang hold	Chen Chao-ming	Changhua County	I	DPP gain from Kuomintang	Chen Hsiu-bao
Miaoli County	II	Kuomintang hold	Hsu Chih-jung	Changhua County	II	DPP hold	Huang Hsiu-fang
Miaoli County	–	–	–	Changhua County	III	Kuomintang gain from DPP	Hsieh Yi-fong
Miaoli County	–	–	–	Changhua County	IV	DPP hold	Chen Su-yueh
Nantou County	I	Kuomintang hold	Ma Wen-chun	Yunlin County	I	DPP hold	Su Chin-feng
Nantou County	II	Kuomintang hold	Hsu Shu-hua	Yunlin County	II	DPP hold	Liu Chien-kuo
Chiayi County	I	DPP hold	Tsai Yi-yu	Pingtung County	I	DPP hold in redrawn constituency	Chung Chia-pin
Chiayi County	II	DPP hold	Chen Ming-wen	Pingtung County	II	Independent hold (Note: Elected member Su Chen-ching is a member of DPP but ran as an independent)	Su Chen-ching
Taitung County		DPP hold	Liu Chao-how	Hualien County		Independent gain from DPP	Fu Kun-chi
Penghu County		DPP hold	Yang Yao	Keelung City		DPP hold	Cai Shi-ying
Hsinchu City		Kuomintang gain from DPP	Cheng Cheng-chien	Chiayi City		DPP hold	Wang Mei-hui
Kinmen County		Kuomintang hold	Chen Yu-chen	Lienchiang County		Kuomintang hold	Cheng Hsueh-sheng
Lowland Aborigine		Kuomintang hold	Sra Kacaw	Highland Aborigine		Independent hold (Note: Kao Chin Su-mei ran as an independent in the election, but she is affiliated to the NPSU)	Kao Chin Su-mei
Lowland Aborigine		Kuomintang hold	Liao Kuo-tung	Highland Aborigine		DPP gain from Kuomintang	Saidai Tarovecahe
Lowland Aborigine		DPP hold	Chen Ying	Highland Aborigine		Kuomintang hold	Kung Wen-chi

==== Aboriginal constituencies ====
Party	Lowlands			Highlands			Total seats	+/–
Party	Votes	%	Seats	Votes	%	Seats	Total seats	+/–
Kuomintang	78,153	64.12	2	50,093	34.61	1	3	–1
Democratic Progressive Party	25,843	21.20	1	25,772	17.81	1	2	+1
Taiwan Renewal Party	5,020	4.12	0				0	New
Formosa Alliance	2,958	2.43	0	577	0.40	0	0	New
Stabilizing Force Party	1,273	1.04	0	1,241	0.86	0	0	New
Green Party Taiwan				1,163	0.80	0	0	0
United Action Alliance	1,029	0.84	0				0	New
Sovereign State for Formosa & Pescadores Party				366	0.25	0	0	New
Independents	7,604	6.24	0	65,512	45.27	1	1	+1
Total	121,880	100.00	3	144,724	100.00	3	6	0
Valid votes	121,880	97.89		144,724	98.07			
Invalid/blank votes	2,624	2.11		2,848	1.93			
Total votes	124,504	100.00		147,572	100.00			
Registered voters/turnout	199,833	62.30		215,115	68.60			
Source: CEC

== See also ==
- Legislative Yuan constituencies
- 2020 Taiwanese general election
