= Taichung City Constituency 3 =

Constituency of the Legislative Yuan of Taiwan

- Single-member constituency for the Legislative Yuan
- District(s): Houli, Shengang, Daya, Tanzi
- Electorate: 260,251 (2024 election)

Current constituency
- Created: 2008 (as Taichung County Constituency 5); 2010 (current name)
- Party: KMT
- Member: Yang Chiung-ying

Taichung City Constituency 3 (Chinese: 臺中市第三選舉區) is one of the 73 regional constituencies represented in the Legislative Yuan, the national legislature of Taiwan. It was created in 2008 (as Taichung County Constituency 5) following a series of constitutional reforms, and elects one legislator, through first-past-the-post voting, to the Legislative Yuan. It has been represented by Yang Chiung-ying of the Kuomintang since 2020.

== Legislators ==
| Election | Legislator | Party |
|---|---|---|
| 2008-2016 | Yang Chiung-ying | Kuomintang |
| 2016-2019 | Hung Tzu-yung | New Power Party |
| 2019-2020 | Hung Tzu-yung | Independent |
| 2020 | Yang Chiung-ying | Kuomintang |

== Election results ==

=== 2008 (Note: Named Taichung County Constituency 5, boundaries unchanged) ===
2008 Taiwanese legislative election: Taichung County 5
| Candidate | Party | Votes | % |
|---|---|---|---|
| Yang Chiung-ying | Kuomintang | 72,270 | 57.69 |
| Kuo Chun-ming | Democratic Progressive Party | 53,012 | 42.31 |
| Total | | 125,282 | 100.00 |
| Valid votes | | 125,282 | 98.31 |
| Invalid/blank votes | | 2,155 | 1.69 |
| Total votes | | 127,437 | 100.00 |
| Registered voters/turnout | | 216,774 | 58.79 |
| Majority | | 19,258 | 15.38 |
| Kuomintang win (new seat) | | | |

=== 2012 ===
* denotes the incumbent legislator

2012 Taiwanese legislative election: Taichung 3
| Candidate | Party | Votes | % | +/– |
|---|---|---|---|---|
| Yang Chiung-ying* | Kuomintang | 99,400 | 57.53 | ▼0.16 |
| Tung Jui-yang | Democratic Progressive Party | 64,601 | 37.39 | ▼4.92 |
| Liu Kun-li | Independent | 8,789 | 5.09 | NEW |
| Total | | 172,790 | 100.00 | – |
| Valid votes | | 172,790 | 98.10 | |
| Invalid/blank votes | | 3,350 | 1.90 | |
| Total votes | | 176,140 | 100.00 | |
| Registered voters/turnout | | 230,003 | 76.58 | |
| Majority | | 34,799 | 20.14 | |
| Kuomintang hold | | | | |

=== 2016 ===
* denotes the incumbent legislator

2016 Taiwanese legislative election: Taichung 3
| Candidate | Party | Votes | % | +/– |
|---|---|---|---|---|
| Hung Tzu-yung | New Power Party | 93,451 | 53.87 | NEW |
| Yang Chiung-ying* | Kuomintang | 78,334 | 45.16 | ▼12.37 |
| Huang Hsin-chi | Military, Civil Servants and Teachers Alliance Party | 1,691 | 0.97 | NEW |
| Total | | 173,476 | 100.00 | – |
| Valid votes | | 173,476 | 98.95 | |
| Invalid/blank votes | | 1,833 | 1.05 | |
| Total votes | | 175,309 | 100.00 | |
| Registered voters/turnout | | 243,934 | 71.87 | |
| Majority | | 15,117 | 8.71 | |
| New Power Party gain from Kuomintang | | | | |

=== 2020 ===
* denotes the incumbent legislator

2020 Taiwanese legislative election: Taichung 3
| Candidate | Party | Votes | % | +/– |
|---|---|---|---|---|
| Yang Chiung-ying | Kuomintang | 91,182 | 46.29 | ▲1.13 |
| Hung Tzu-yung* | Independent | 90,213 | 45.79 | NEW |
| Chang Jui-tsang | Taiwan People's Party | 14,700 | 7.46 | NEW |
| Chang Chiung-chun | Formosa Alliance | 331 | 0.17 | NEW |
| Chu Li-fan | Interfaith Union | 323 | 0.16 | NEW |
| Sung Pai-cheng | Sovereign State for Formosa & Pescadores Party | 247 | 0.13 | NEW |
| Total | | 196,996 | 100.00 | – |
| Valid votes | | 196,996 | 98.92 | |
| Invalid/blank votes | | 2,159 | 1.08 | |
| Total votes | | 199,155 | 100.00 | |
| Registered voters/turnout | | 255,442 | 77.96 | |
| Majority | | 969 | 0.5 | |
| Kuomintang gain from New Power Party | | | | |

=== 2024 ===
* denotes the incumbent legislator

2024 Taiwanese legislative election: Taichung 3
| Candidate | Party | Votes | % | +/– |
|---|---|---|---|---|
| Yang Chiung-ying* | Kuomintang | 106,306 | 55.72 | ▲9.43 |
| Hsieh Tzu-han | Democratic Progressive Party | 80,128 | 42.00 | NEW |
| Chang Chiung-chun | Judicial Reform Party | 4,368 | 2.29 | NEW |
| Total | | 190,802 | 100.00 | – |
| Valid votes | | 190,802 | 98.40 | |
| Invalid/blank votes | | 3,101 | 1.60 | |
| Total votes | | 193,903 | 100.00 | |
| Registered voters/turnout | | 260,251 | 74.51 | |
| Majority | | 26,178 | 13.72 | |
| Kuomintang hold | | | | |
