= Kao Yu-ting =

Taiwanese politician

- 高鈺婷
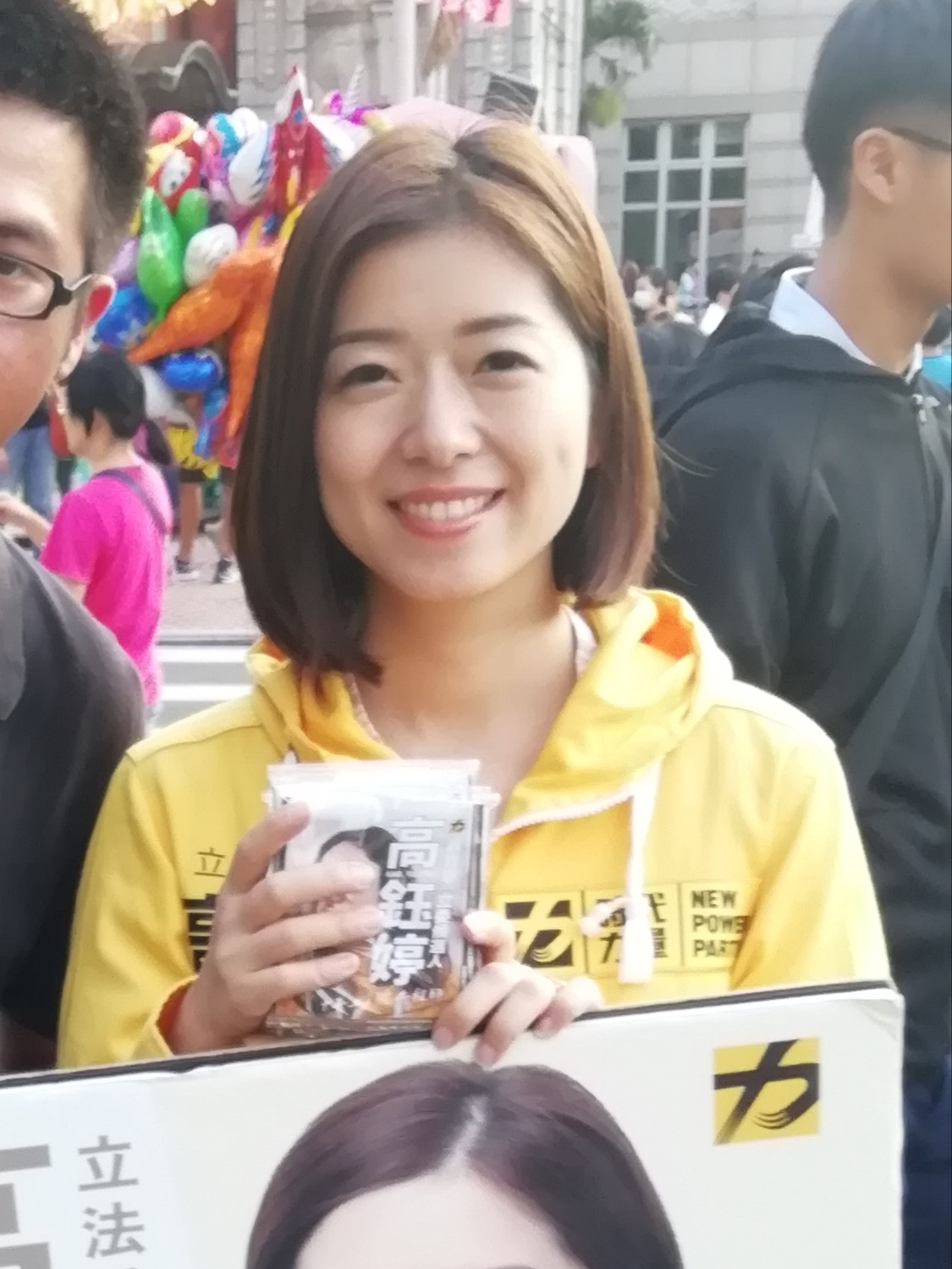
- Kao campaigning in Hsinchu, 2019

6th Chairperson of the New Power Party
- In office 29 August 2020 – 10 November 2020 (acting after 3 November 2020)
- Preceded by: Hsu Yung-ming; Chiu Hsien-chih (acting)
- Succeeded by: Chen Jiau-hua

Personal details
- Born: 28 March 1985 (age 41) Taipei County, Taiwan
- Party: New Power Party (since 2015)
- Children: 2
- Education: National Huwei Institute of Technology (BS); National Taiwan University of Science and Technology (MS)

Chinese name
- Traditional Chinese: 高鈺婷
- Simplified Chinese: 高钰婷
Transcriptions
Standard Mandarin
- Hanyu Pinyin: Gāo Yùtíng
- Wade–Giles: gao1 yu4ting2

Kao Yu-ting (Chinese: 高鈺婷; born 28 March 1985) is a Taiwanese engineer and politician. She joined the New Power Party in 2015, served as party leader from August to November 2020.

== Early life and career ==
Kao was born on 28 March 1985 in Taipei County and was raised in Taipei. She attended Taipei Municipal Da-An Vocational High School, then enrolled at the National Huwei Institute of Technology, within the department of aeronautical engineering. Kao subsequently completed a master's degree in electrical engineering at the National Taiwan University of Science and Technology. Prior to her political career, Kao worked at the Industrial Technology Research Institute.

== Political career ==
Following the Sunflower Student Movement, Kao became a member of Taiwan March. Kao joined the New Power Party in 2015, and contested the Hsinchu City Constituency seat on the Legislative Yuan on the party's behalf in 2020. Her unsuccessful legislative campaign was backed by Wu Nien-jen. Following the mass resignation of acting chair Chiu Hsien-chih and all members of the New Power Party's executive council on 5 August 2020, Kao was elected to the body with the second highest vote share, trailing only Claire Wang, and assumed the party leadership with the council's support on 29 August 2020. Kao announced her intention to resign as chair on 3 November 2020. Kao stated that her resignation as chair and from the executive council would take effect upon the inauguration of a new chair. Kao said that she assumed leadership of the party to help the party reform its operations, and resigned because the objective had been achieved. She felt pressured to begin planning for the 2022 elections, but believed that the task was better left to her successor. Kao was replaced by Chen Jiau-hua on 10 November 2020.

== Personal life ==
Kao has two daughters.
