= Chen Meng-hsiu =

Taiwanese lawyer and politician

- 陳孟秀

Secretary-General of the New Power Party
- In office 1 March 2019 – 30 August 2019
- Preceded by: Chen Hui-min
- Succeeded by: Wu Pei-yun

Personal details
- Born: 21 November 1975 (age 50)
- Education: Chinese Culture University (LLB, LLM)
- Occupation: Human rights lawyer, politician

Chen Meng-hsiu (Chinese: 陳孟秀; pinyin: Chén Mèngxiù; born 21 November 1975) or Cirasmita Chen is a Taiwanese lawyer and politician.

Chen was a human rights lawyer prior to her career in politics. She was appointed Chen Hui-min's successor as secretary-general of the New Power Party on 1 March 2019, when party chairman Chiu Hsien-chih took office. As secretary-general, Chen Meng-hsiu announced the party's electoral strategy for the 2020 legislative election. When Chiu resigned from the chairmanship on 12 August 2019, Chen managed party affairs while the position was vacant. Hsu Yung-ming, Chiu's successor as New Power Party chair, announced on 30 August 2019 that Wu Pei-yun would replace Chen as secretary-general.
