= Chen Huimin =

Chen Huimin may refer to:

- Chen Hui-min (born 1972), Taiwanese politician
- Michael Chan (actor) (born 1946), or Chen Huimin, Hong Kong actor
