= Wang Wan Yu =

Wang Wan Yu may refer to:

- Wang Wanyu (王婉钰; born 1997), Chinese rugby sevens player
- Claire Wang (王婉諭; born 1979) or Wang Wan-yu, Taiwanese politician
