= Jimmy Kuo =

Taiwanese politician (born 1955)

Kuo Chun-ming MLY
- 郭俊銘
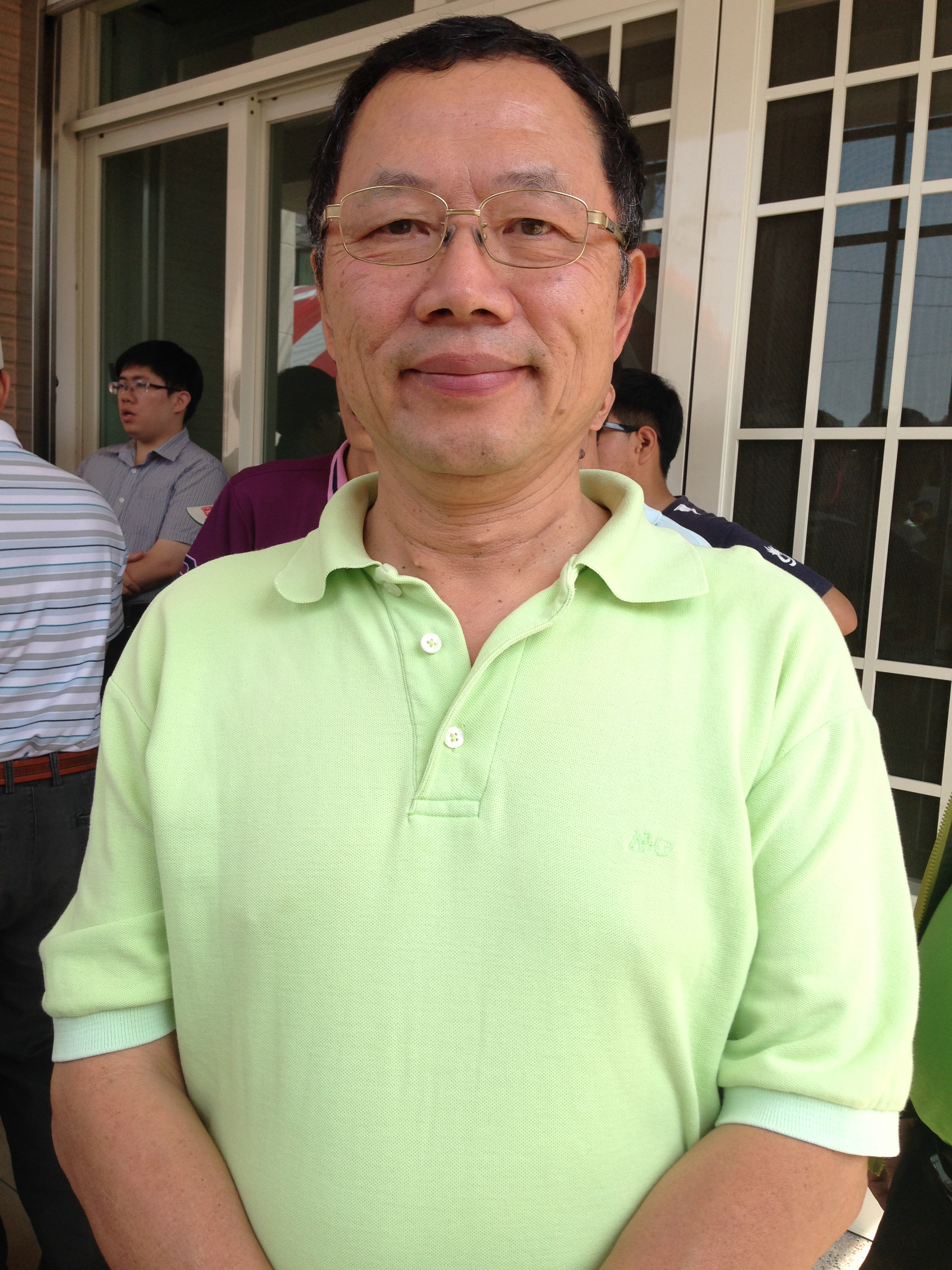
- Kuo in October 2014

Member of the Legislative Yuan
- In office 1 February 2002 – 31 January 2008
- Constituency: Taichung County

Personal details
- Born: 17 October 1955 (age 70) Taichung, Taiwan
- Party: Democratic Progressive Party
- Education: National Cheng Kung University (BS)

Kuo Chun-ming (Chinese: 郭俊銘; born 17 October 1955), also known by his English name Jimmy Kuo, is a Taiwanese politician.

== Education ==
After graduating from the Affiliated Senior High School of National Taiwan Normal University, Kuo earned a Bachelor of Science (B.S.) in materials engineering from National Cheng Kung University.

== Political career ==
Kuo served one term on the Taiwan Provincial Consultative Council. He left to lead the Democratic Progressive Party's organization and development department. Within the DPP, Kuo was affiliated with the New Tide faction. In 2001, Kuo was elected to the Legislative Yuan for the first time. He was reelected in 2004. During his legislative tenure, Kuo was often critical of the National Communications Commission.

Kuo lost to Yang Chiung-ying in the 2008 legislative elections, and was defeated by Johnny Chiang in 2012. By 2016, Kuo was chairman of the Taiwan Water Corporation. He resigned from Taiwater in January 2019.
