= Jang Show-ling =

Taiwanese economist and politician

Jang Show-ling MLY
- 鄭秀玲
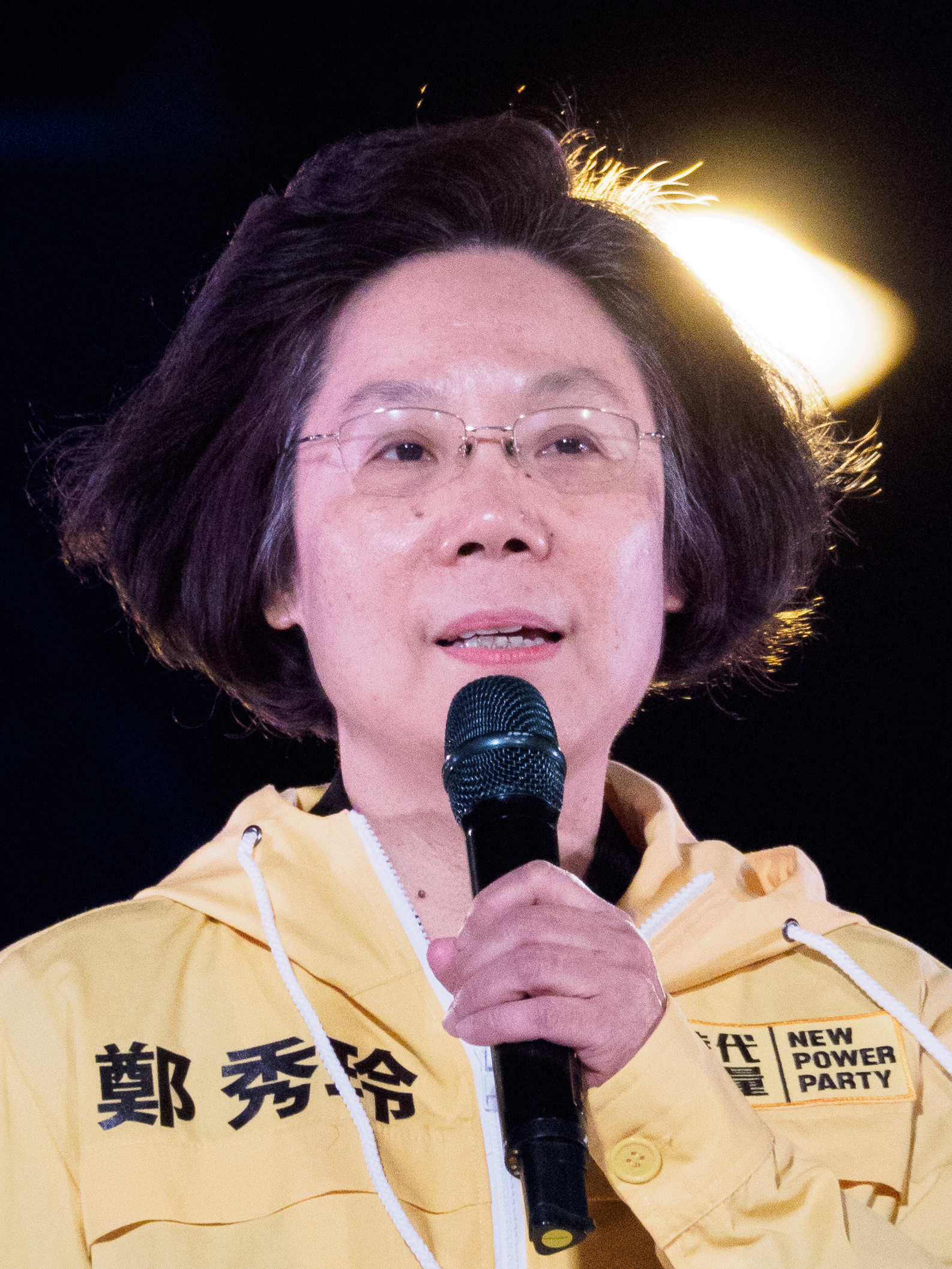
- Jang in 2016

Member of the Legislative Yuan
- In office 11 September 2019 – 31 January 2020
- Preceded by: Kawlo Iyun Pacidal
- Constituency: National At-Large

Personal details
- Born: 9 October 1955 (age 70) Taipei, Taiwan
- Party: New Power Party (since 2015)
- Education: National Taiwan University (BA, MS); Rensselaer Polytechnic Institute (PhD)
- Profession: Economist

Jang Show-ling (Chinese: 鄭秀玲; Tongyong Pinyin: Jhèng Siùlíng; born 9 October 1955) is a Taiwanese economist and politician who was a member of the Legislative Yuan from 2019 to 2020.

== Education ==
Jang graduated from National Taiwan University with a Bachelor of Arts (B.A.) in economics in 1978 and a Master of Science (M.S.) in urban planning in 1981. She then completed doctoral studies in the United States, where she earned her Ph.D. in economics from the Rensselaer Polytechnic Institute in Troy, New York, in 1987. Her doctoral dissertation was titled, "Productivity growth and technical change in the US semiconductor, computer and telecommunications equipment industries".

== Career ==
Jang joined the National Taiwan University faculty in August 1992 as an associate professor. She was appointed to a full professorship in August 2006. Jang served as director of the research and development office of NTU's College of Social Sciences between August 2008 and July 2012, after which she was named chair of the Department of Economics.

Jang opposed a merger of Want Want China Broadband and China Network Systems proposed in 2012. She also criticized another proposed acquisition, that of Next Media by Want Want. In an analysis of the Cross-Strait Service Trade Agreement signed between China and Taiwan in 2013, Jang stated that the pact should be renegotiated, because as signed, the deal lacked transparency, was unequal, and focused on economic interests at the risk of the national interest. Jang estimated that the CSSTA would affect over 1,000 industries and millions of Taiwanese workers, and stated that the Ma Ying-jeou presidential administration discussed the agreement with larger businesses, but did not reach out to mid-sized and small companies. She believed that, faced with resource-rich Chinese enterprises, smaller businesses in Taiwan would find themselves unable to compete and were likely to leave the market. Jang claimed in 2014 that the CSSTA-mandated opening of Taiwan's service market would result in millions of job losses. She stated later that year that the pact would lead to Chinese investment in Taiwan's local infrastructure, through which the island's economy could be controlled.

The attempted legislative ratification of the CSSTA led to the Sunflower Student Movement. In the aftermath of the protest, the New Power Party was founded. Jang accepted an at-large legislative nomination from the NPP in 2016, placing third of six candidates on the NPP party list, but was not elected to the Legislative Yuan. Jang remained on the National Taiwan University faculty, where she opposed the election of Kuan Chung-ming as university president. Jang replaced Kawlo Iyun Pacidal as an at-large legislator on 11 September 2019, following the revocation of Kawlo's NPP membership.

After stepping down from the Legislative Yuan, Jang returned to National Taiwan University's Department of Economics as an adjunct professor.
