= Chen Hui-min =

Taiwanese politician

- 陳惠敏

Secretary-General of the New Power Party
- In office 25 January 2015 – 1 March 2019
- Leader: Freddy Lim; Huang Kuo-chang
- Preceded by: Position established
- Succeeded by: Chen Meng-hsiu

Personal details
- Born: 1972 (age 53–54)
- Party: New Power Party (since 2015)

Chen Hui-min (Chinese: 陳惠敏; pinyin: Chén Huìmǐn; born 1972) is a Taiwanese politician.

Chen was active in the Civil Alliance to Promote Constitutional Reform. She later led Taiwan March, an organization formed after the events of the Sunflower Student Movement. The New Power Party was also established by a number of protest leaders in January 2015, and Chen became the political party's first secretary-general. In this role, Chen made announcements about electoral strategy in 2016, expansion of the New Power Party, and political cooperation with the Democratic Progressive Party. In 2017, Chen opined on the need to defend Taiwanese sovereignty and the nation's exclusion from international organizations. In March 2019, Chen was one of 64 candidates to contest an internal election to the NPP's executive committee. She won one of the fifteen seats. Following the election of Chiu Hsien-chih as chairman of the New Power Party, Chen left her position as the party's secretary-general, and was succeeded by Chen Meng-hsiu. Chen Hui-min became party leader in Kaohsiung, and launched a 2020 legislative campaign from Fongshan.
