= Hung Tzu-yung =

Taiwanese politician

Hung Tzu-yung MLY
- 洪慈庸
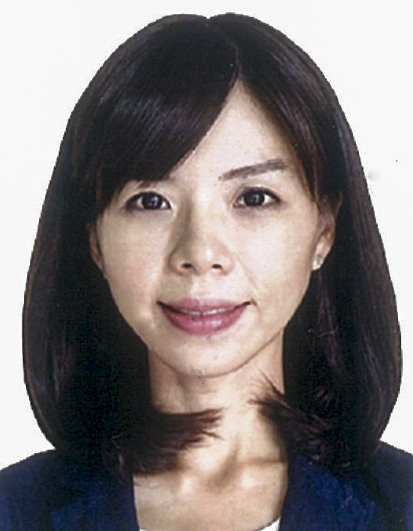

Member of the Legislative Yuan
- In office 1 February 2016 – 11 January 2020
- Preceded by: Yang Chiung-ying
- Succeeded by: Yang Chiung-ying
- Constituency: Taichung 3

Personal details
- Born: 20 December 1982 (age 43) Shalu, Taichung County, Taiwan
- Party: Independent (since 2019)
- Other political affiliations: New Power Party (2015–2019)
- Spouse: Cho Kuan-ting (m. 2017)
- Children: 1
- Education: National Kaohsiung First University of Science and Technology (BS)

Hung Tzu-yung (Chinese: 洪慈庸; pinyin: Hóng Cíyōng; born 20 December 1982) is a Taiwanese politician. Following the death of Hung Chung-chiu, her younger brother, in 2013, she joined the New Power Party upon its founding in 2015, and won election to the Legislative Yuan. Hung left the NPP in August 2019, partway through her first legislative term.

== Education ==
She obtained her bachelor's degree in marketing and distribution management from National Kaohsiung First University of Science and Technology.

== Political career ==
On 24 February 2015, Hung was nominated by the New Power Party as candidate for the legislative seat in the 3rd constituency of Taichung City, which includes Tanzi, Daya, Shengang and Houli. She opposed incumbent Kuomintang legislator Yang Chiung-ying in the 2016 legislative election, whom she defeated by 15,117 votes. After taking office, Hung was assigned to the Social Welfare and Environmental Hygiene Committee. Hung left the NPP on 13 August 2019, over a disagreement regarding the status of the NPP's cooperation with the Democratic Progressive Party. Hung announced that she would work more closely with the DPP and seek reelection in 2020 as an independent. However, she lost the 2020 elections to her former opponent, Yang Chiung-ying.
