= Kawlo Iyun Pacidal =

Taiwanese Aboriginal politician (born 1977)

Kawlo Iyun Pacidal MLY
- 高潞·以用·巴魕剌
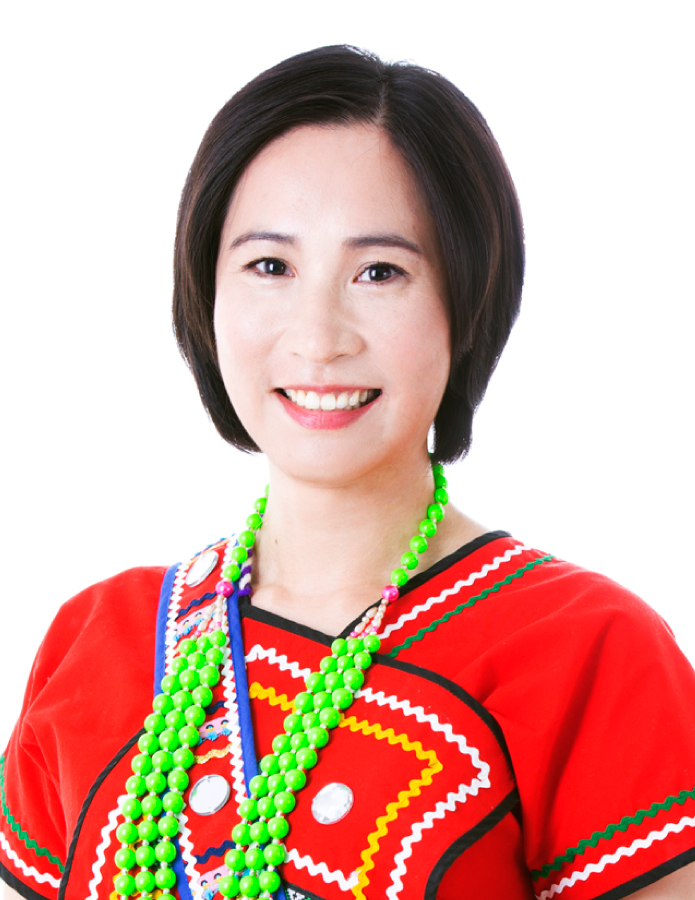

Member of the Legislative Yuan
- In office 1 February 2016 – 2 September 2019
- Succeeded by: Jang Show-ling
- Constituency: Republic of China

Personal details
- Born: 9 April 1977 (age 49) Taipei, Taiwan
- Party: Taiwan Renewal Party (since 2019)
- Other political affiliations: New Power Party (2015–2019)
- Profession: TV presenter

Kawlo Iyun Pacidal (Chinese: 高潞·以用·巴魕剌; pinyin: Gāolù Yǐyòng Bājǐlá; born 9 April 1977 in Taipei, Taiwan) is a Taiwanese politician and former TV presenter. In January 2016 she was elected to serve in the Legislative Yuan as an at-large legislator on the party list of the New Power Party. Kawlo is a member of the Amis tribe of Taiwan's indigenous people and the cousin of singer Ilid Kaolo.

== Political career ==
Kawlo was a founding member of the Amis Defense Alliance, an organisation dedicated to opposing excessive construction on Taiwan's east coast. Kawlo's first electoral experience was in standing for the Hualien County Council as an independent in 2014. She was a candidate in the 6th electoral district (which includes Fenglin, Shoufeng, Guangfu, Fengbin, and Wanrong), and fell 223 votes short of winning a seat.

In 2015 Kawlo joined the newly created New Power Party (NPP) and was subsequently placed first on their party list for the 2016 Legislative Yuan election. As the NPP polled 6.1% of the vote in the party list ballot, she was duly elected as one of the NPP's two at-large legislators. Kawlo's political positions include pushing for recognition of the independence of Aboriginal tribes and acknowledgment of sovereignty over traditional tribal lands, as well as full enforcement of the Indigenous Basic Act. Upon taking office, Kawlo was assigned to the Education and Culture Committee.

In July 2019, Green Party Taiwan accused Kawlo of securing government subsidies for non-government organizations founded by her former legislative assistant Chen Shih-chang and run by Chen Shih-chang's successor Chen En-tse. Subsequently, the New Power Party voted to suspend Kawlo's membership. Kawlo responded to the allegations by dismissing her legislative staff, and commencing an investigation into the case. The New Power Party's decision to revoke Kawlo's membership was upheld by an arbitration committee on 3 September 2019.

Kawlo ran in the 2020 Taiwanese legislative election for a seat in the multimember Lowland Aborigine Constituency on behalf of the Taiwan Renewal Party, but was not elected.
