= Chen Jiau-hua =

Taiwanese politician

Chen Jiau-hua MLY
- 陳椒華
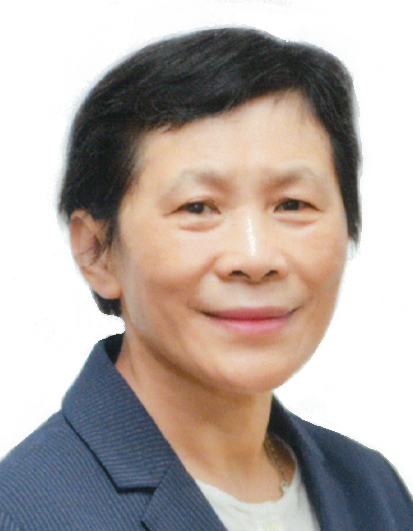

Member of the Legislative Yuan
- In office 1 February 2020 – 31 January 2024
- Constituency: Nationwide and Overseas (Party-list)

7th Chairperson of the New Power Party
- In office 10 November 2020 – 28 February 2023
- Preceded by: Kao Yu-ting
- Succeeded by: Claire Wang

Personal details
- Born: 29 October 1959 (age 66) Tainan, Taiwan
- Party: New Power Party (since 2019)
- Education: Kaohsiung Medical University (MB); National Tsing Hua University (MS)

Chinese name
- Traditional Chinese: 陳椒華
- Simplified Chinese: 陈椒华
Transcriptions
Standard Mandarin
- Hanyu Pinyin: Chén Jiāohuá
Southern Min
- Hokkien POJ: Tân Chiohôa

Chen Jiau-hua (born 29 October 1959) is a Taiwanese pharmacist, conservationist, and politician. She won the 2020 legislative elections as a member of the New Power Party. Chen served as leader of the New Power Party from 10 November 2020.

== Education ==
Chen graduated from Kaohsiung Medical University with a Bachelor of Medicine (M.B.) specializing in pharmacy. She then earned a Master of Science (M.S.) in radiobiology from National Tsing Hua University in 1984.

== Political career ==
In November 2019, Chen accepted a nomination from the New Power Party to contest the 2020 election as an at-large legislative candidate. She was ranked first on the NPP party list. The New Power Party won over seven percent of the party list vote, allowing three at-large legislative candidates to take office. On 10 November 2020, Chen was subsequently elected party chairman, succeeding Kao Yu-ting.

On 17 August 2022, in the aftermath of then Speaker of the United States House of Representatives Nancy Pelosi's visit to Taiwan on 2–3 August, China blacklisted seven Taiwanese officials including Chen as "diehard "Taiwan independence" separatists" due to their support for Taiwan independence. The blacklist bans them from entering mainland China and the Special Administrative Regions of Hong Kong and Macau, and restricts them from working with Chinese officials. Chinese state-run tabloid Global Times labelled Chen and the six officials as "diehard secessionists".

Following the 2022 local elections, Chen resigned as NPP chair.
