= Chiu Hsien-chih =

Taiwanese politician (born 1976)

Chiu Hsien-chih MLY
- 邱顯智
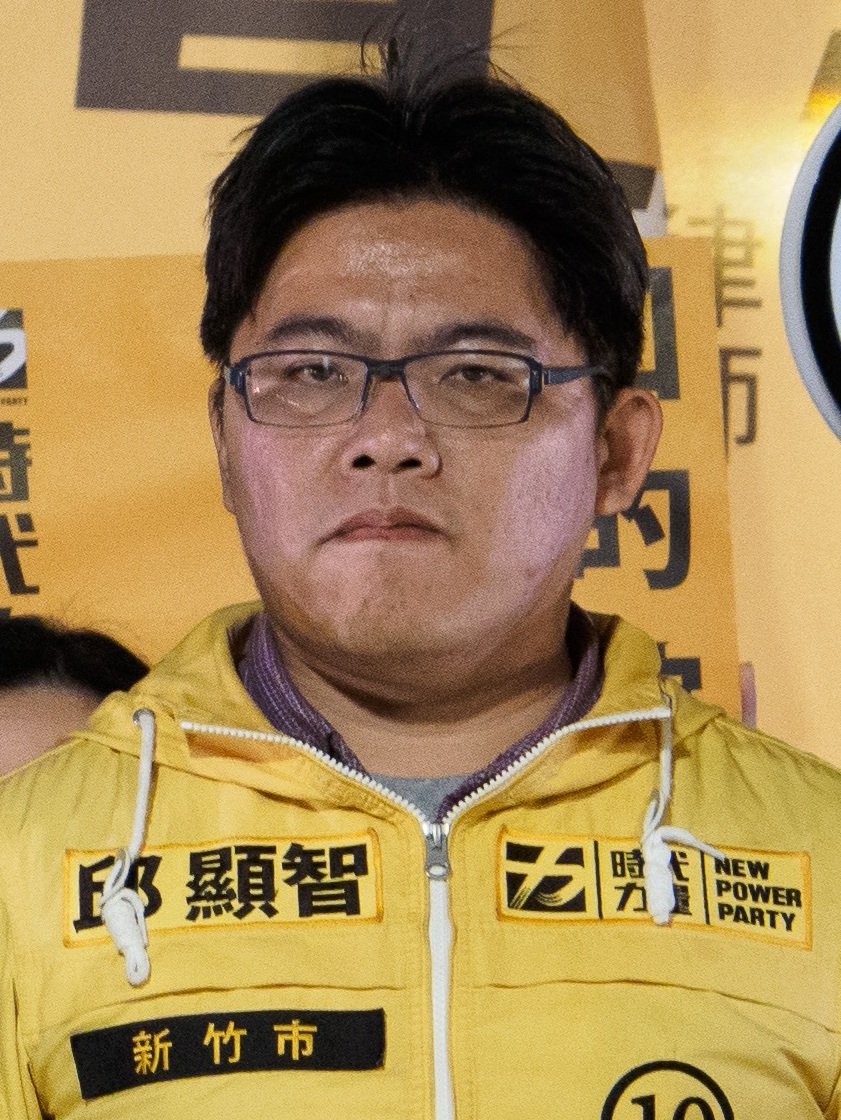
- Chiu in January 2016

Member of the Legislative Yuan
- In office 1 February 2020 – 31 January 2024
- Constituency: Party-list

3rd and 5th Chairperson of the New Power Party
- Acting; 1 August 2020 – 5 August 2020
- Preceded by: Hsu Yung-ming
- Succeeded by: Kao Yu-ting
- In office 1 March 2019 – 12 August 2019
- Preceded by: Huang Kuo-chang
- Succeeded by: Hsu Yung-ming

Personal details
- Born: 29 April 1976 (age 50) Zhuqi, Chiayi County, Taiwan
- Party: New Power Party (since 2015)
- Spouse: Huang Wan-ting
- Children: 2
- Education: National Taipei University (LLB, LLM); Heidelberg University (LLM)

Chinese name
- Traditional Chinese: 邱顯智
- Simplified Chinese: 邱显智
Transcriptions
Standard Mandarin
- Hanyu Pinyin: Qiū Xiǎnzhì
Southern Min
- Hokkien POJ: Khu Hiántì

Chiu Hsien-chih (born 29 April 1976) is a Taiwanese lawyer and politician. He contested the 2016 and 2020 legislative elections as a member of the New Power Party, winning the latter election. Chiu served as leader of the New Power Party between March and August 2019, and was reappointed to the role in an acting capacity in August 2020.

== Early life and education ==
Chiu was born on 29 April 1976, and was raised in Zhuqi, Chiayi County, near Fengchih Lake. His mother was a factory worker and his father was a teacher.

Chiu studied law at National Taipei University, where he graduated with LL.B. and LL.M. degrees. He then lived in Germany for five years, where he completed a second LL.M. at Heidelberg University. Chiu returned to Taiwan in 2010, without completing Heidelberg's Doktor der Rechtswissenschaft program. He and his wife Huang Wan-ting moved to Huang's native Hsinchu, where the couple raised two children.

== Legal career ==
After the death of Hung Chung-chiu, Hung's family hired Chiu as legal counsel. He remained the Hung family's legal representative until the conclusion of the case, an appeal heard in June 2017. During the Sunflower Student Movement, Chiu served as spokesman for a group of over three hundred lawyers that pledged legal aid to protesters. Chiu also represented Liu Yen-kuo in a murder case dating to 1997 until Liu's execution on 29 April 2014, Chiu's birthday. Chiu worked with fellow lawyer Tseng Wei-kai on the Hualon Textile workers' compensation case. Chiu often offered legal commentary in his capacity as chairman of the Taiwan Association for Human Rights. In 2015, Chiu was present at an Anti-Black Box Curriculum Movement demonstration to offer legal assistance. The next year, Chiu represented music teacher Hsiao Hsiao-ling in a wrongful termination lawsuit. After Chiu contested the 2016 legislative elections as a New Power Party candidate, the party retained him for its legal team. Chiu has since taken on cases relating to public safety.

Lawyers Chiu, Tseng, Liu Chi-wei, and Essen Lee were featured in a 2016 documentary directed by James Su titled Fight For Justice. In December 2017, Chiu published his first book in the Chinese language, Stand By You, about several of the legal cases he had worked up to that point in time.

== Political career ==
Chiu joined the New Power Party (NPP) upon its founding in 2015. In February of that year, Chiu and Hu Po-yen became the first two people to represent the party as legislative candidates. Chiu faced incumbent lawmaker Lu Hsueh-chang in the Hsinchu district. The New Power Party attempted to ally itself with the Democratic Progressive Party (DPP), but Chiu was critical of Ker Chien-ming, the DPP's candidate in Hsinchu, and refused to abandon his bid for office to support Ker's. Chiu's main point of contention with Ker centered on political transparency within the legislature. In October 2015, Chiu claimed that Ker had not responded to offers for the two candidates to debate each other before integration polling started. With no deal in place to conduct integration polling, Chiu formally registered his legislative candidacy by the November 2015 deadline. Chiu's campaign partnered with that of Hu Po-yen, Hung Tzu-yung, Ko Shao-chen, and Freddy Lim, winning early support from Lin Yi-hsiung. Chiu's campaign team was led by Chen Wei-ting, a leader of the Sunflower Movement. Other Sunflower activists, such as Lin Fei-fan and Dennis Wei, also contributed to Chiu's campaign. During the campaign, Chiu spoke in support of legislative reform, and sharply criticized the scheduled Ma–Xi meeting. After Chiu Hsien-chih lost the election to Ker Chien-ming, he was named to a NPP task force on legislative reform. In April 2016, the New Power Party opened its inaugural local office in Hsinchu, and named Chiu its first director. In February 2019, Chiu contested an open seat on the New Power Party's executive committee and was subsequently elected party chairman, succeeding Huang Kuo-chang. Chiu resigned the party leadership on 12 August 2019, soon after Freddy Lim left the party, and Kawlo Iyun Pacidal's membership was suspended. Following the departure of Hung Tzu-yung from the party, the NPP continued attempts to convince Chiu to return as chair. Chiu refused to resume the chairmanship, and stated that either Hsu Yung-ming or Tseng Wei-kai should run for the position. In November 2019, Chiu accepted a nomination from the New Power Party to contest the 2020 election as an at-large legislative candidate. He was ranked second on the NPP party list. The New Power Party won over seven percent of the party list vote, allowing three at-large legislative candidates to take office. Within the Tenth Legislative Yuan, Chiu served as New Power Party caucus whip. On 1 August 2020, Chiu was named acting NPP chairman following Hsu Yung-ming's suspension from the post. Chiu and all members of the New Power Party's executive committee resigned their positions on 5 August, and the succeeding committee elected Kao Yu-ting to replace Chiu on 29 August.

Party political offices
Preceded by Huang Kuo-chang	Chairperson of the New Power Party; 2019	Succeeded by Hsu Yung-ming
Preceded by Hsu Yung-ming	Chairperson of the New Power Party (acting); 2020	Succeeded by Kao Yu-ting
