= Yang Chiung-ying =

Taiwanese politician

Yang Chiung-ying MLY
- 楊瓊瓔
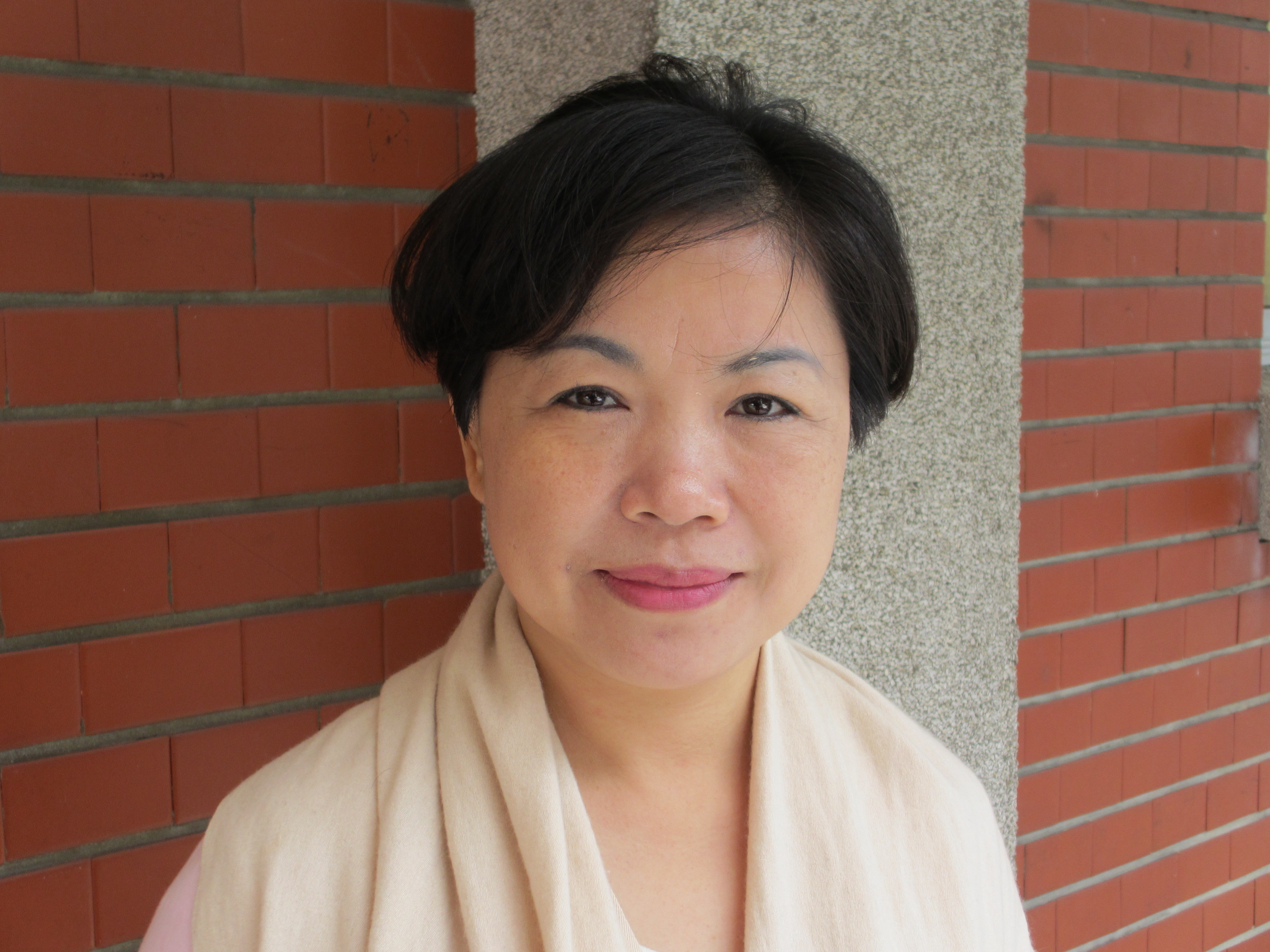
- Yang in 2013

Member of the Legislative Yuan
- Incumbent
- Assumed office 1 February 2020
- Preceded by: Hung Tzu-yung
- Constituency: Taichung 3
- In office 1 February 1999 – 1 February 2016
- Succeeded by: Hung Tzu-yung
- Constituency: Taichung County→Taichung 3

Personal details
- Born: 19 October 1964 (age 61) Taichung County, Taiwan
- Party: Kuomintang
- Education: Tunghai University (BA, MA)

Yang Chiung-ying (Chinese: 楊瓊瓔; pinyin: Yáng Qióngyīng; born 19 October 1964) is a Taiwanese politician. She was first elected to the Legislative Yuan in 1998, and served until 2016, when she was defeated by Hung Tzu-yung. Yang then served as deputy mayor of Taichung within the municipal administration of Lu Shiow-yen. She was re-elected to the Legislative Yuan in 2020.

Before entering politics, Yang graduated from Tunghai University with a bachelor's degree in sociology and earned a master's degree in public affairs from the university.
