= Lin Yi-ying =

Taiwanese politician

- 林易瑩
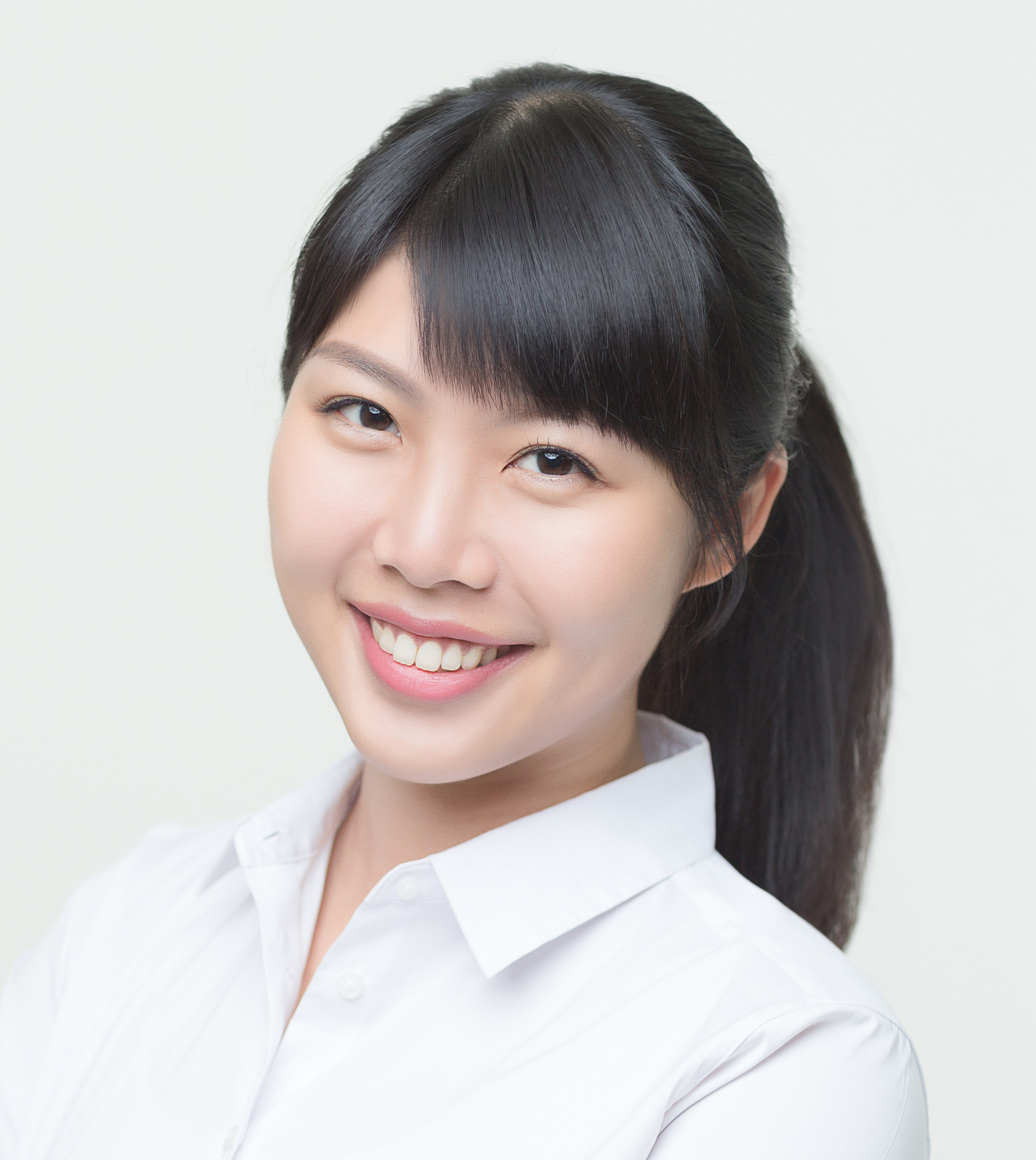

Tainan City Councilor
- Incumbent
- Assumed office 25 December 2018
- Constituency: Tainan City District 6 (serving Yongkang)

Personal details
- Born: 7 July 1992 (age 33) Taichung, Taiwan
- Party: New Power Party
- Education: National Cheng Kung University (BA)

Lin Yi-ying (Chinese: 林易瑩; born 7 July 1992) is a Taiwanese politician. A member of the New Power Party. She has served as a councillor of Tainan City Council since 2018. She was elected councillor representing Tainam City District 7 during the local elections.

== Early life and education ==
Lim was born on 7 July 1992, and was raised in Taichung City. She attended National Wen-Hua Senior High School and National Cheng Kung University. She joined the Zero Two Club and served as its president. She was given a major demerit during a protest against the school, which was later revoked. She has participated in Sunflower Student Movement, anti-media monopoly campaigns, and has also been elected as the president of university students.

== Political career ==
She took office as councillor of Tainan City in 2018, on Constitution Day, which coincides with Christmas Day.

In February 2019, Lin contested an open seat on the New Power Party's executive committee. Lin was also elected to the New Power Party's executive council on 29 August 2020.

== See also ==
- New Power Party
