= New Power Party =

Political party in Taiwan

New Power Party 時代力量
- Leader: Claire Wang
- Secretary: Bai Ching-feng
- Founded: 25 January 2015
- Headquarters: Taipei City, Taiwan
- Ideology: Left-wing nationalism Progressivism (Taiwanese); Taiwanese independence
- Political position: Centre-left to left-wing
- National affiliation: Taiwan Go Go; Historical (before 2018): Pan-Green Coalition
- Colours: Yellow, black
- Legislative Yuan: 0 / 113
- Municipal mayors: 0 / 6
- Magistrates/mayors: 0 / 16
- Councillors: 6 / 910
- Township/city mayors: 0 / 204

Website
- www.newpowerparty.tw

New Power Party
- Traditional Chinese: 時代力量
- Literal meaning: Power of the Era
Transcriptions
Standard Mandarin
- Hanyu Pinyin: Shídài Lìliàng
Hakka
- Pha̍k-fa-sṳ: Sṳ̀-thoi Li̍t-liong
Yue: Cantonese
- Jyutping: Si^{4}doi^{6} Lik^{6}loeng^{6}
Southern Min
- Hokkien POJ: Sî-tāi Le̍k-liōng

The New Power Party (NPP) is a political party in Taiwan formed in early 2015. The party emerged from the Sunflower Student Movement in 2014, and advocates for universal human rights, civil and political liberties, as well as Taiwan independence/nationalism. The party is a part of the political phenomenon known as the "Third Force" (第三勢力), in which new political parties, unaligned with traditional Pan-Green or Pan-Blue Coalitions, sought to provide an alternative in Taiwanese politics. Nevertheless, the NPP's policies are very much aligned with and closely match the Pan-Green camp; thus the NPP cooperated with the Democratic Progressive Party (DPP) against the Kuomintang (KMT) in the 2016 elections, going as far as not to run in traditional KMT strongholds to avoid competition with the DPP. The party works in tandem with a perceived generational shift towards Taiwan-centrism as the new socio-cultural norm.

The party was started by Freddy Lim, lead vocalist of Taiwanese heavy metal band Chthonic, veteran activist Michael Lin, human rights lawyers Lin Feng-cheng, Chiu Hsien-chih, and other prominent figures of the Sunflower Student Movement. Lim headed the party-building process, which saw the inclusion of Hung Tzu-yung, sister of the late Hung Chung-chiu, environmental lawyer Ko Shao-chen, and author-activist Neil Peng into the party. On 12 September 2015, the NPP was officially formed with the election of Huang Kuo-chang as executive leader, heading a leadership team of six deputy leaders.

The NPP won five legislative seats in the 2016 Taiwanese legislative election, three from constituency and two from party-list votes, beating out long-time third party People First Party. However, two of its legislators left the party in 2019. In the 2020 Taiwanese legislative election, NPP won three party-list seats.

== Platform ==
The NPP aims to rewrite the Constitution of the Republic of China, which operates under the assumption that the Republic governs all of China (including mainland China, which the ROC has not governed since 1949), to just refer to Taiwan.

The NPP supports the legalization of same-sex marriage and is generally in favor of abolition of capital punishment. The NPP also takes a more left-wing stance compared to the DPP on labor and welfare.

== History ==
The party was established on 25 January 2015. In the 2016 Taiwanese legislative election, the first contested by the party, the NPP won five seats in the Legislative Yuan, making it the third largest party in the Ninth Legislative Yuan. Three of the candidates gained constituency seats and two were elected through the party list. Freddy Lim and Hung Tzu-yung left the NPP in August 2019, though both remained independent members of the Ninth Legislative Yuan and chose to align with the DPP. That same month, NPP legislator Kawlo Iyun Pacidal was suspended from the party. Kawlo, a party-list legislator, was replaced by Jang Show-ling in September 2019.

In the 2020 Taiwanese legislative election, the New Power Party won three party list seats, which elected Chen Jiau-hua, Chiu Hsien-chih, and Claire Wang as legislators of the Tenth Legislative Yuan.

The party lost all its seats in the 2024 legislative election, failing to reach the 5 percent threshold for the party-list seats.

After the 2024 elections, NPP formed alliance with some minor parties in the Pan-Green coalition on topics in defending Taiwan Sovereignty and replacing the Taiwan People's Party and Kuomintang. They have also formed electoral pact via not directly competing against each other in the 2026 Taiwanese local election.

== Leadership ==
Order	Term	Executive Leader	Deputy Team Leader	Leadership Team	Assumed office	Left office
1	1	Freddy Lim	Lin Feng-cheng	Freddy Lim; Neil Peng; Hsu Yung-ming; Lin Feng-cheng; Michael Lin; Huang Hsiu-chen (黃秀禎)	25 January 2015	2 July 2015
2	1	Huang Kuo-chang	Lin Feng-cheng	Freddy Lim; Neil Peng; Hsu Yung-ming; Lin Feng-cheng; Michael Lin; Huang Hsiu-chen (黃秀禎)	2 July 2015	25 March 2016
2	2	Huang Kuo-chang	Lin Feng-cheng	Freddy Lim; Ko I-chen; Kawlo Iyun Pacidal; Lin Feng-cheng; Michael Lin	25 March 2016	January 2019
3	3	Chiu Hsien-chih	Ko I-chen	Chiu Hsien-chih ~~Freddy Lim~~; ~~Hung Tzu-yung~~; Ko I-chen; Lin Yu-kai; ~~Kawlo Iyun Pacidal~~; Chen Hui-min Lee Bo-yi (李柏毅); Chen Wei-chung; ~~Sabrina Lim~~; Chen Chih-ming; ~~Tseng Wen-hsueh (曾玟學)~~; ~~Hsu Yung-ming~~; Lin Yi-ying; ~~Hsiao Hsin-cheng~~; Tseng Wei-kai	1 March 2019	Freddy Lim left the party on 1 August 2019. Chiu resigned as party chief on 12 August 2019. Hung left the party on 13 August 2019. Kawlo's party membership was revoked on 2 September 2019.
4	3	Hsu Yung-ming	Ko I-chen	Chiu Hsien-chih ~~Freddy Lim~~; ~~Hung Tzu-yung~~; Ko I-chen; Lin Yu-kai; ~~Kawlo Iyun Pacidal~~; Chen Hui-min Lee Bo-yi (李柏毅); Chen Wei-chung; ~~Sabrina Lim~~; Chen Chih-ming; ~~Tseng Wen-hsueh (曾玟學)~~; ~~Hsu Yung-ming~~; Lin Yi-ying; ~~Hsiao Hsin-cheng~~; Tseng Wei-kai	21 August 2019	Sabrina Lim (林亮君) left the party on 11 November 2019. Hsu was suspended on 1 August 2020, with Chiu Hsien-chih taking over as acting party chief.
5	3	Chiu Hsien-chih	Ko I-chen	Chiu Hsien-chih ~~Freddy Lim~~; ~~Hung Tzu-yung~~; Ko I-chen; Lin Yu-kai; ~~Kawlo Iyun Pacidal~~; Chen Hui-min Lee Bo-yi (李柏毅); Chen Wei-chung; ~~Sabrina Lim~~; Chen Chih-ming; ~~Tseng Wen-hsueh (曾玟學)~~; ~~Hsu Yung-ming~~; Lin Yi-ying; ~~Hsiao Hsin-cheng~~; Tseng Wei-kai	1 August 2020 (acting)	Hsu resigned from the party on 5 August 2020. Chiu Hsien-chih later announced the whole committee has resigned for new election. Tseng Wen-hsueh resigned from the party on 23 August 2020.
6	3	Kao Yu-ting		Claire Wang ~~Kao Yu-ting~~; Chiu Hsien-chih; Chen Jiau-hua; Lin Yu-kai; Lin Chia-wei; Chang Wei-hang; Chien Chih-hsiang; Wu Wei-ta; Bai Ching-feng; Sung Kuo-ting; Peng Sheng-shao; Li Chao-li; Lin Yi-ying; Lin Yen-fu; ~~Liu yuh-sien~~ Tseng Wei-kai	29 August 2020	Kao resigned as party chief and executive council on 17 November 2020.
7	3	Chen Jiau-hua		Claire Wang ~~Kao Yu-ting~~; Chiu Hsien-chih; Chen Jiau-hua; Lin Yu-kai; Lin Chia-wei; Chang Wei-hang; Chien Chih-hsiang; Wu Wei-ta; Bai Ching-feng; Sung Kuo-ting; Peng Sheng-shao; Li Chao-li; Lin Yi-ying; Lin Yen-fu; ~~Liu yuh-sien~~ Tseng Wei-kai	17 November 2020	
7	4	Chen Jiau-hua		Chen Jiau-hua Claire Wang; Chiu Hsien-chih; Lin Yu-kai; Chen Wei-chung; Wu Wei-ta; Wu Pei-yun; Bai Ching-feng; Chang Wei-hang; Lai Chia-lun; Peng Sheng-shao; Chien Chih-hsiang; Lin Yu-ting; Liao Tzu-chi; Chen Meng-hsiu	1 March 2021	28 February 2023
7	5	Claire Wang			1 March 2023	

=== Secretary-General ===
1. Chen Hui-min (25 January 2015 – 1 March 2019)
2. Chen Meng-hsiu (1 March 2019 – 30 August 2019)
3. Wu Pei-yun (30 August 2019 – 1 March 2020)
4. Chen Chih-ming (1 March 2020 – 29 August 2020)
5. Kao Yu-ting (16 September 2020 – 17 November 2020)
6. Bai Ching-feng (since 17 November 2020)

=== Legislative Yuan leader (caucus leader) ===
- Hsu Yung-ming (1 February 2016 – 10 September 2019)
- Huang Kuo-chang (10 September 2019 – 31 January 2020)
- Chiu Hsien-chih (since 1 February 2020 – 31 January 2024)

== Election results ==
=== Legislative elections ===
Election	Total seats won	Total votes (party-list)	Vote share (party-list)	Change	Election leader	Status	President
2016	5 / 113	744,315	6.11%	▲5 seats	Huang Kuo-chang	3rd party	Tsai Ing-wen
2020	3 / 113	1,098,100	7.75%	▼2 seats	Hsu Yung-ming	4th party	Tsai Ing-wen
2024	0 / 113	353,670	2.57%	▼3 seats	Claire Wang	Not represented	Lai Ching-te

Name		Constituency	Term
Freddy Lim	林昶佐	Taipei 5	2016–2019 (Note: Lim and Hung left the NPP in 2019 due to disagreement with the central party leadership over cooperation with the Democratic Progressive Party.)
Huang Kuo-chang	黃國昌	New Taipei 12	2016–2020
Hung Tzu-yung	洪慈庸	Taichung 3	2016–2019
Kawlo Iyun Pacidal	高潞·以用·巴魕剌	Proportional representation	2016–2019 (Note: The NPP revoked Kawlo's membership after a conflict of interest scandal surfaced.)
Hsu Yung-ming	徐永明	Proportional representation	2016–2020
Jang Show-ling	鄭秀玲	Proportional representation	2019–2020 (Note: Jang replaced Kawlo's seat.)
Chen Jiau-hua	陳椒華	Proportional representation	2020–2024
Chiu Hsien-chih	邱顯智	Proportional representation	2020–2024
Claire Wang	王婉諭	Proportional representation	2020–2024

=== Local elections ===
Election	Mayors & Magistrates	Councils	Third-level Municipal heads	Third-level Municipal councils	Fourth-level Village heads	Election Leader
2018 unified	0 / 22	16 / 912	0 / 204	0 / 2,148	1 / 7,744	Huang Kuo-chang
2022 unified	0 / 22	6 / 910	0 / 204	1 / 2,139	1 / 7,748	Chen Jiau-hua

The New Power Party fielded 40 candidates for city and county councils across Taiwan in the local elections of November 2018. Sixteen NPP candidates for local office won.

The party nominated candidates for mayor and magisterial posts for the first time prior to the 2022 local elections.

== See also ==
- Formosa Alliance
- List of political parties in Taiwan
- Pan-Purple Coalition
- Politics of Taiwan
- Taiwan independence Left
