= Claire Wang =

Taiwanese politician

Claire Wang MLY
- 王婉諭
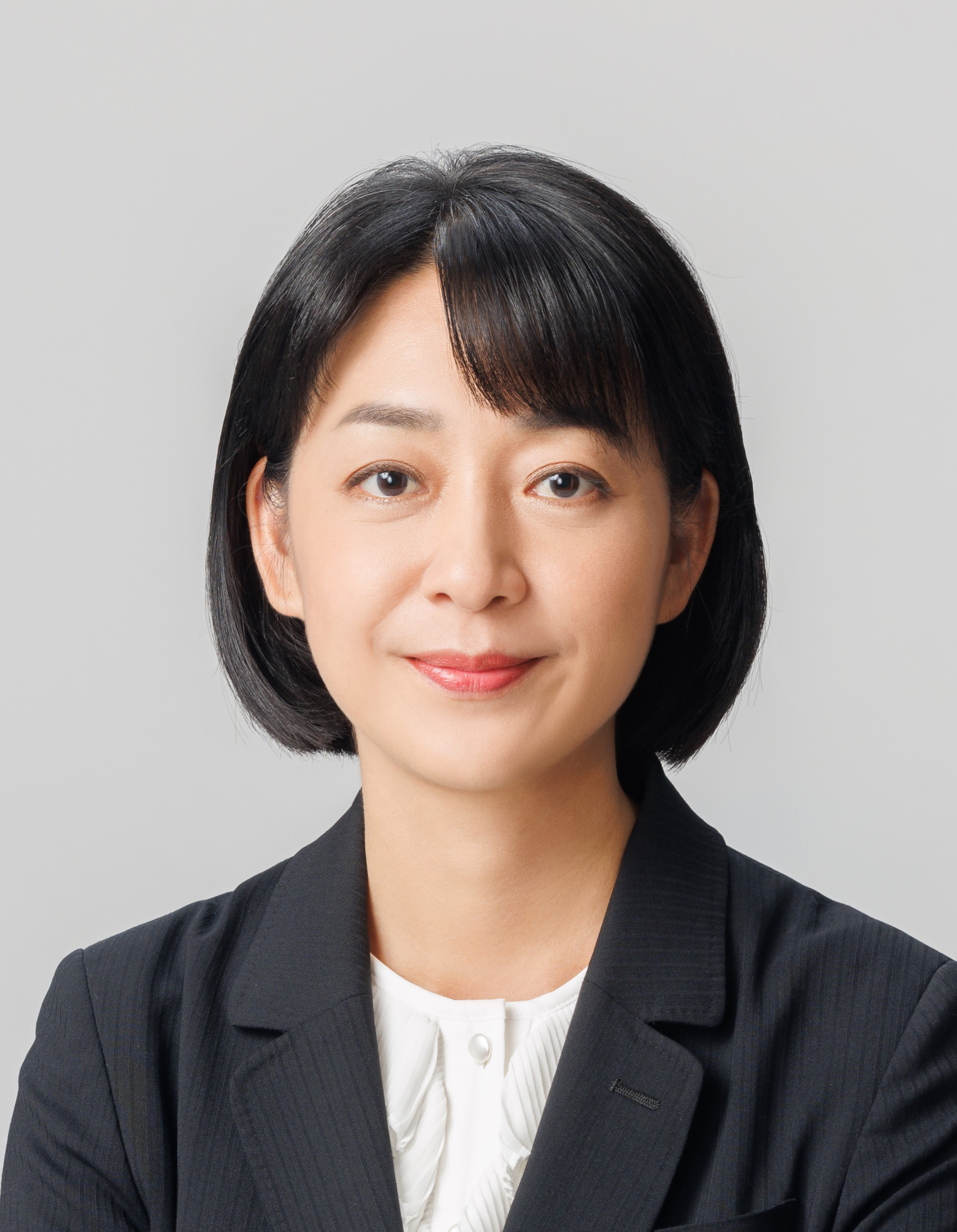
- Official portrait, 2023

7th Chairperson of the New Power Party
- Incumbent
- Assumed office 1 March 2023 (Note: Acting from 13 January to 26 February 2024)
- Preceded by: Chen Jiau-hua

Member of the Legislative Yuan
- In office 1 February 2020 – 31 January 2024
- Constituency: Party-list

Personal details
- Born: 26 April 1979 (age 47) Miaoli County, Taiwan
- Party: New Power Party (since 2019)
- Spouse: David Liu
- Children: 4
- Education: National Taiwan University (BS); University of Southern California (MS)

Chinese name
- Traditional Chinese: 王婉諭
Transcriptions
Standard Mandarin
- Hanyu Pinyin: Wáng Wǎnyù

Wang Wan-yu (Chinese: 王婉諭; pinyin: Wáng Wǎnyù; born 26 April 1979), also known by her English name Claire Wang, is a Taiwanese politician. Following the murder of her daughter in March 2016, Wang was named to the Presidential Office Organizing Committee for National Conferences on Judicial Reforms. She subsequently joined the New Power Party and won a seat on the Legislative Yuan in 2020. Currently, she serves as NPP party chairperson since March 2023.

== Early life and education ==
Wang was born in Miaoli County on 26 April 1979. After graduating from National Taiwan University with a bachelor's degree in geology, she completed graduate studies in the United States at the University of Southern California (USC), where she earned a Master of Science (M.S.) in materials science. Wang initially began doctoral studies at the University of Southern California but later withdrew.

== Political career ==
Claire Wang was ranked third of twelve candidates on the New Power Party proportional representation party list. Her bid for public office was endorsed by Wu Nien-jen. The New Power Party received over seven percent of the party list vote, and Wang was elected to the Tenth Legislative Yuan. Wang secured three votes in an election for Vice President of the Legislative Yuan, losing the office to incumbent deputy speaker Tsai Chi-chang. Wang was elected to the New Power Party's executive council on 29 August 2020, winning the highest vote share. Wang won reelection to the NPP executive committee in February 2023. Wang was subsequently elected to the position of party chair, succeeding Chen Jiau-hua, who had resigned.

== Personal life ==
Both Wang and her husband, David Liu, studied at the University of Southern California, and the couple returned to Taiwan after finishing their studies. Liu began working in technology, and Wang remained home, to care for their four children.

In November 2016, Claire Wang was invited to take part in the Presidential Office Organizing Committee for National Conferences on Judicial Reforms. The sixteen other committee members were businesspeople or legal scholars; Wang served as the sole voice for victims of crime.

After her election to the Legislative Yuan in January 2020, threats against her other children were made online, and she began legal action against the people who made the posts, as well as those who supported the threats.

=== Wang Ching-yu case and trial ===
The youngest daughter of Liu and Wang died on 28 March 2016, while traveling with her mother. The child was decapitated by a man, Wang Ching-yu, as she rode a bicycle along Huanshan Road in Neihu District on the way to Xihu metro station. The child became known as Little Light Bulb, a nickname bestowed by her mother, in media coverage of the case. A visitation was held on 31 March 2016, followed by another ceremony on 13 April 2016. After the visitation, Claire Wang received a condolence letter from Annette Lu, and spoke out against the politicalization of her daughter's death with regards to views on capital punishment. Wang said that she herself "does not support" the death penalty, but also "does not agree" with its abolition.

Prosecutors indicted Wang Ching-yu on charges of homicide and sought the death penalty. The Shilin District Court began hearing Wang Ching-yu's case in June 2016. The first ruling on the case was issued on 12 May 2017; the Shilin District Court sentenced Wang Ching-yu to life imprisonment. The Taiwan High Court heard an appeal in July 2018, and upheld the previous ruling. A second appeal in January 2020 retained life imprisonment as a punitive measure. Another appeal to the Supreme Court was dismissed on 15 April 2020. The verdict was final, and maintained that Wang Ching-yu was subject to life imprisonment.
