= Hsu Yung-ming =

Taiwanese political scientist, pollster and politician (born 1966)

Hsu Yung-ming MLY
- 徐永明
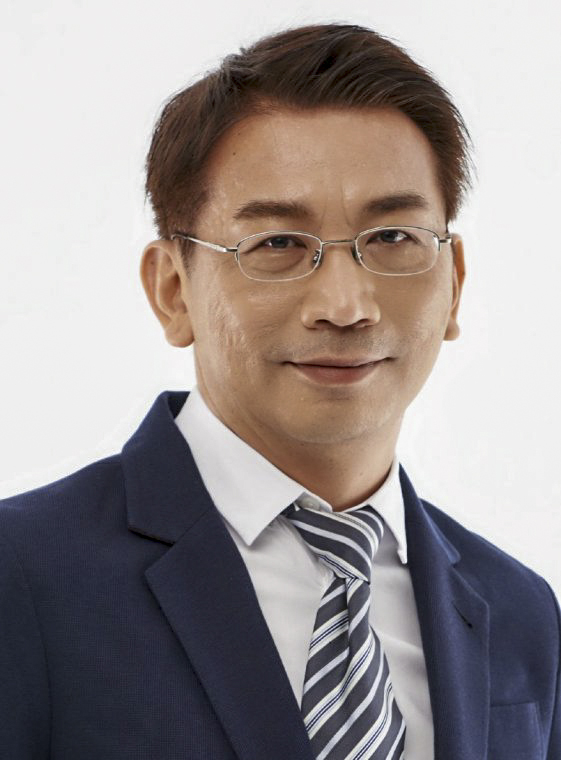
- Official portrait, 2019

4th Chairperson of the New Power Party
- In office 21 August 2019 – 1 August 2020
- Preceded by: Chiu Hsien-chih
- Succeeded by: Chiu Hsien-chih (acting)

Member of the Legislative Yuan
- In office 1 February 2016 – 31 January 2020
- Constituency: National At-Large

Personal details
- Born: 15 May 1966 (age 60) Taichung County, Taiwan
- Party: Independent; New Power Party (2015–2020)
- Education: National Taiwan University (BA, MA); University of Michigan (PhD)

Chinese name
- Chinese: 徐永明
Transcriptions
Standard Mandarin
- Hanyu Pinyin: Xú Yǒngmíng

Hsu Yung-ming (Chinese: 徐永明; pinyin: Xú Yǒngmíng; born 15 May 1966) is a Taiwanese political scientist, pollster, and politician. He represented the New Power Party within the Legislative Yuan from 2016 to 2020. In August 2019, he began serving as NPP chairman. Following his removal from the post in August 2020, Hsu withdrew from the party.

== Education ==
After graduating from Taipei Municipal Chien Kuo High School in 1985, Hsu studied political science at National Taiwan University and obtained a bachelor's degree in 1989 and a master's degree in 1994. He then pursued doctoral studies in the United States, earning his Ph.D. in political science from the University of Michigan in 1999. His doctoral dissertation, "The formation of national identity in Taiwan," was completed under political scientist Christopher H. Achen of Princeton University. After receiving his doctorate, Hsu began a teaching career at National Chung Cheng University.

== Academic career ==
In the mid-2000s, Hsu was a political analyst and research fellow at Academia Sinica's Research Center for Humanities and Social Sciences. He later joined the faculty of Soochow University, where he taught political science, and served as director of the Taiwan Brain Trust think tank. After completing his term on the Legislative Yuan and stepping away from party politics, Hsu returned to his teaching position at Soochow.

=== Political stances as an academic ===
Citing survey data from the Mainlander Taiwanese Association, Hsu opined in 2005 that differing views of the 228 Incident are no longer an ethnic issue, but instead a cross-party conflict. He has criticized the Kuomintang and People First Party's electoral strategy in the 2000 presidential elections, comparing it to the Democratic Party's loss in the United States presidential elections held that same year. Shortly after the 2006 protests led by Shih Ming-teh, Hsu wrote that the proposed formation of a third presidential ticket in the 2008 election would have taken more votes from the Democratic Progressive Party, leading to an easy Kuomintang victory. The KMT won that election without the materialization of a third-party candidate.

Hsu believes that increased economic cooperation between Taiwan and China is a manifestation of dependency theory.

== Political career ==
Hsu joined the New Power Party on 21 June 2015, after failing to secure a legislative nomination in the Taichung area from the Democratic Progressive Party. Hsu was named a deputy leader of the NPP on 13 September 2015, and stepped down from that position in March 2016. He served the party within the Legislative Yuan as its first caucus whip.

=== Legislative actions ===
Despite Kuomintang opposition, Hsu and the New Power Party introduced a motion in July 2016 to abolish the Red Cross Society Act of the Republic of China, which exempted the Red Cross Society from oversight by the Ministry of the Interior. The order was adopted and promulgated by the Presidential Office on 27 July 2016.

=== New Power Party chairmanship and legal judgements ===
On 21 August 2019, Hsu was elected chairman of the New Power Party by a 7–5 vote of its executive council. He was removed from the post on 1 August 2020, following allegations of bribery. Hsu withdrew from the New Power Party four days later. The Taipei District Court ruled in July 2022 that Hsu had violated the Anti-Corruption Act, and sentenced him to seven years and four months imprisonment.

Party political offices
Preceded by Chiu Hsien-chih	Chairperson of the New Power Party; 2019–2020	Succeeded by Chiu Hsien-chih (acting)
