= Legislative Yuan =

Unicameral national legislature of Taiwan

Coordinates: 25.0439°N 121.5196°E

Legislative Yuan of the Republic of China
- 11th Legislative Yuan

Type
- Type: Unicameral Lower house (1947–2005)

History
- Founded: 5 December 1928; 97 years ago (pre-1947 Constitution); 8 May 1948; 78 years ago (1947 Constitution); 24 February 1950; 76 years ago (Taiwan); 7 June 2005; 21 years ago (current form)
- Disbanded: 1 October 1949; 77 years ago (mainland); 7 December 1949; 76 years ago (government relocated)
- Preceded by: National Assembly
- Succeeded by: Chinese People's Political Consultative Conference (1949); National People's Congress (1954)

Leadership
- President: Han Kuo-yu (KMT) since 1 February 2024
- Vice President: Johnny Chiang (KMT) since 1 February 2024
- Governing party leader: Tsai Chi-chang (DPP) since 24 February 2026
- Opposition leader: Fu Kun-chi (KMT) since 1 February 2024

Structure
- Seats: 113 (Note: Number of seats in the amended constitution. The number of seats in the original constitution was 759.)
- Political groups: Government (51): DPP (51); Opposition (62): KMT Caucus (54); KMT (53); Independent (1); TPP (8)
- Length of term: 4 years

Elections
- Voting system: Parallel voting: 73 seats by FPTP; 34 seats by party-list PR using largest remainder method with Hare quota; 6 seats by SNTV
- First election: 21–23 January 1948
- Last election: 13 January 2024
- Next election: On or before January 2028

Meeting place
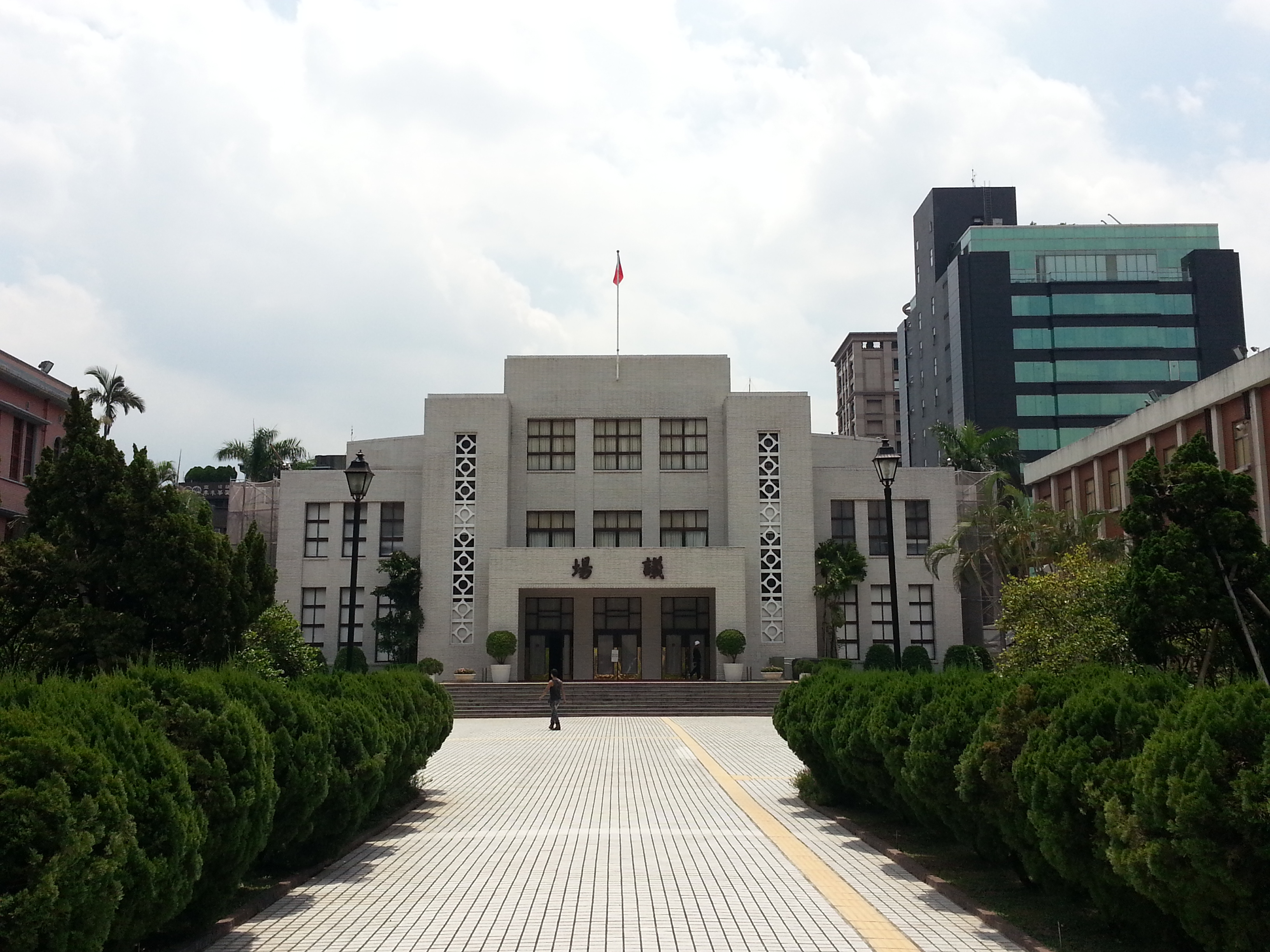
- The Legislative Yuan Building, No. 1, Zhongshan South Road; Zhongzheng District, Taipei City, Republic of China
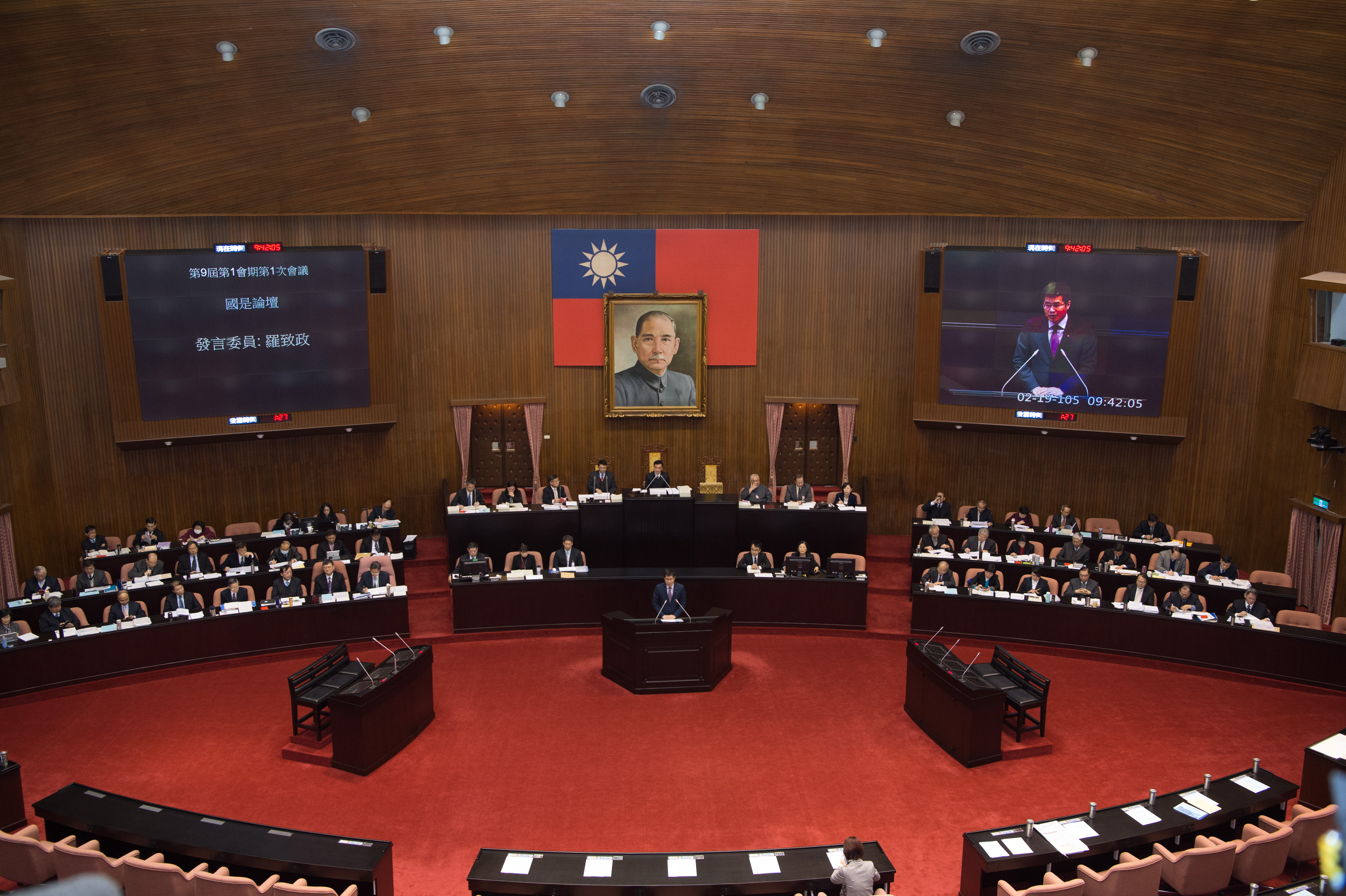

Website
- www.ly.gov.tw (in English)

Constitution
- Additional Articles and the original Constitution of the Republic of China

Legislative Yuan
- Chinese: 立法院
- Literal meaning: Law-establishing court
Transcriptions
Standard Mandarin
- Hanyu Pinyin: Lìfǎyuàn
- Bopomofo: ㄌㄧˋ ㄈㄚˇ ㄩㄢˋ
- Gwoyeu Romatzyh: Lihfaa Yuann
- Wade–Giles: Li^{4}-fa^{3} Yüan^{4}
- Tongyong Pinyin: Lì-fǎ-yuàn
- MPS2: Lìfǎ Yuàn
- IPA: [lî.fà.ɥɛ̂n]
other Mandarin
- Xiao'erjing: لِيفَايُوَن
Hakka
- Romanization: Li̍p-fap Yen
Southern Min
- Hokkien POJ: Li̍p-hoat-īⁿ
- Tâi-lô: Li̍p-huat-īnn

The Legislative Yuan (Note: Chinese: 立法院; pinyin: Lìfǎyuàn; lit. 'Law-making court') (Note: Alternatively, it is also known the Parliament of Taiwan by local Taiwanese citizens and western media, or the Legislative Body by Mainland Chinese state-owned media) is the unicameral legislature of the Republic of China (Taiwan), located in Taipei. Since 2008, it is composed of 113 members who serve four-year terms. They are directly elected by voters in the Taiwan Area, through a parallel voting system.

Originally located in Nanjing, the Legislative Yuan, along with the National Assembly (electoral college) and the Control Yuan (upper house), formed the tricameral parliament under the original 1947 Constitution. The Legislative Yuan previously had 760 members representing constituencies in all of China (includes provinces, municipalities, Tibet Area, and various professions in Mainland China).

Until democratization, the Republic of China was an authoritarian state under the Dang Guo system. At the time, the Legislative Yuan functioned as a rubber stamp for the ruling regime of the Kuomintang.

Like parliaments or congresses of other countries, the Legislative Yuan is responsible for the passage of legislation, which is then sent to the president for signing. For these similarities, it is also common for people to refer to the Legislative Yuan as "the parliament" (國會; Guóhuì; Kok-hōe).

Under the current amended Constitution, the Legislative Yuan, as the only parliamentary body, also holds the power to initiate several constitutional processes, including initiating constitutional amendments (then determined by a national referendum), recalls of the president (then determined by a recall vote), and impeachments of the president (then tried by the Constitutional Court).

== Composition ==
=== Legislators ===
Starting with the 2008 legislative elections, changes were made to the Legislative Yuan in accordance with a constitutional amendment passed in 2005. The Legislative Yuan has 113 members serving four-year terms; 73 members are elected by first-past-the-post, 6 reserved for indigenous candidates by single non-transferable vote, and 34 by party-list proportional representation. The current Legislative Yuan convened on 1 February 2024, and its term ends on 31 January 2028.

Seat composition in the Legislative Yuan by caucus
Party/Caucus	Caucus leader	Seats
Kuomintang (KMT) Caucus	Fu Kun-chi	54
Democratic Progressive Party (DPP) Caucus	Ker Chien-ming	51
Taiwan People's Party (TPP)	Huang Kuo-chang	8
(as of February 2024)	Total	113

The five largest parties with three or more seats can form caucuses. If there are fewer than five such parties, legislators in other parties or with no party affiliation can form caucuses with at least four members.

=== Leadership ===
The president and vice president of the Legislative Yuan are elected by the 113 legislators during a preparatory session in the beginning of their 4-year terms. President and vice president of the Legislative Yuan sometimes translate to speaker and deputy speaker respectively in English.

The President is responsible for appointing the Secretary-General and Deputy Secretary-General of the Legislative Yuan, as well as other legislative staff, who are described as the Administrative Unit. The Vice President serves in place during the absence of the President.

== Functions ==
=== Powers ===
Like legislatures of other countries, the Legislative Yuan holds the following power according to the current amended Constitution:

- make laws and approve national budget, treaties, and emergency decrees issued by the president
- review executive decrees
- interpellation of government officials
- initiate no-confidence votes against the Executive Yuan
- approve appointments to the Examination Yuan, the Control Yuan, the grand justices, the auditor general, the public prosecutor general, the National Communications Commission, the Fair Trade Commission and the Central Election Commission,
- initiate the recall of the president or the vice president, and the impeachment of the president or the vice president
- initiate constitutional amendments, which must be referred to a referendum

Other governmental organs are authorized to propose legislative bills to the Legislative Yuan. Legislative bills proposed to the Legislative Yuan have to be cosigned by a certain number of legislators. Once a bill reaches the legislature, it is subject to a process of three readings.

=== Committees ===
- Standing committees:
  - Internal Administration Committee
  - Social Welfare and Environmental Hygiene Committee
  - Judiciary and Organic Laws and Statutes Committee
  - Transportation Committee
  - Education and Culture Committee
  - Finance Committee
  - Economics Committee
  - Foreign and National Defense Committee
- Ad hoc committees:
  - Procedure Committee
  - Expenditure Examination Committee
  - Constitutional Amendment Committee
  - Discipline Committee

== History ==
=== Constitutional theory ===
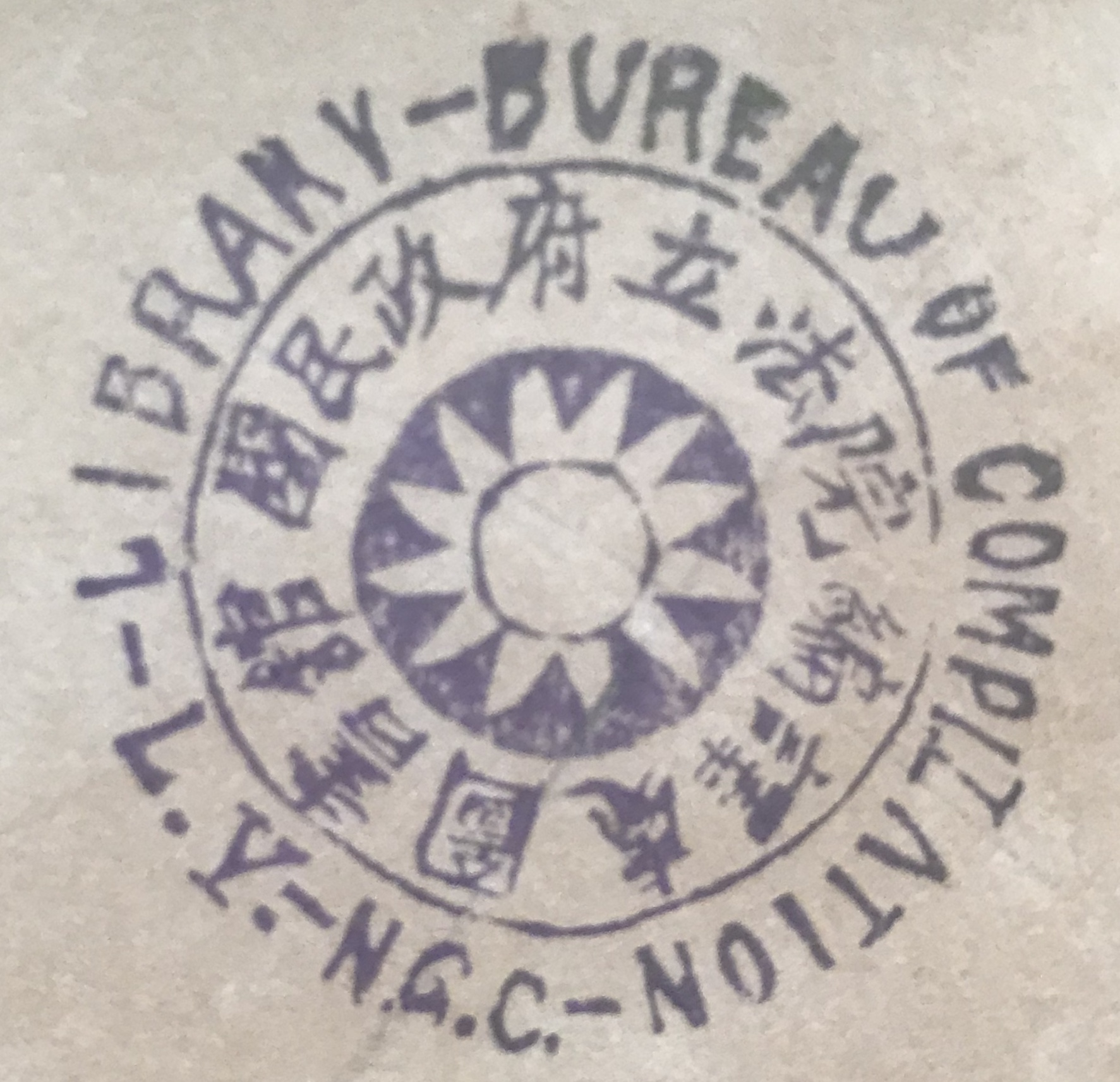
A stamp from the Legislative Yuan Library when it was based in Nanjing

The concept of Legislative Yuan was introduced by Sun Yat-sen's Three Principles of the People. The theory proposed a separation of powers into five branches (五院; wǔyuàn; gō͘-īⁿ). The Legislative Yuan, under Sun's political theory, is a branch of government elected by the National Assembly that serves as the standing legislative body when the National Assembly is not in session.

The legislators are to be elected through direct elections. In the constitution, Legislative Yuan, together with National Assembly and Control Yuan, form three chambers of a tricameral parliament according to the Judicial Yuan's interpretation number 76 of the Constitution (1957).

However, the later constitutional amendments in the 1990s removed the parliamentary roles from National Assembly and Control Yuan and transferred them to the Legislative Yuan, which became an unicameral parliament.

=== Establishment and relocation to Taiwan ===
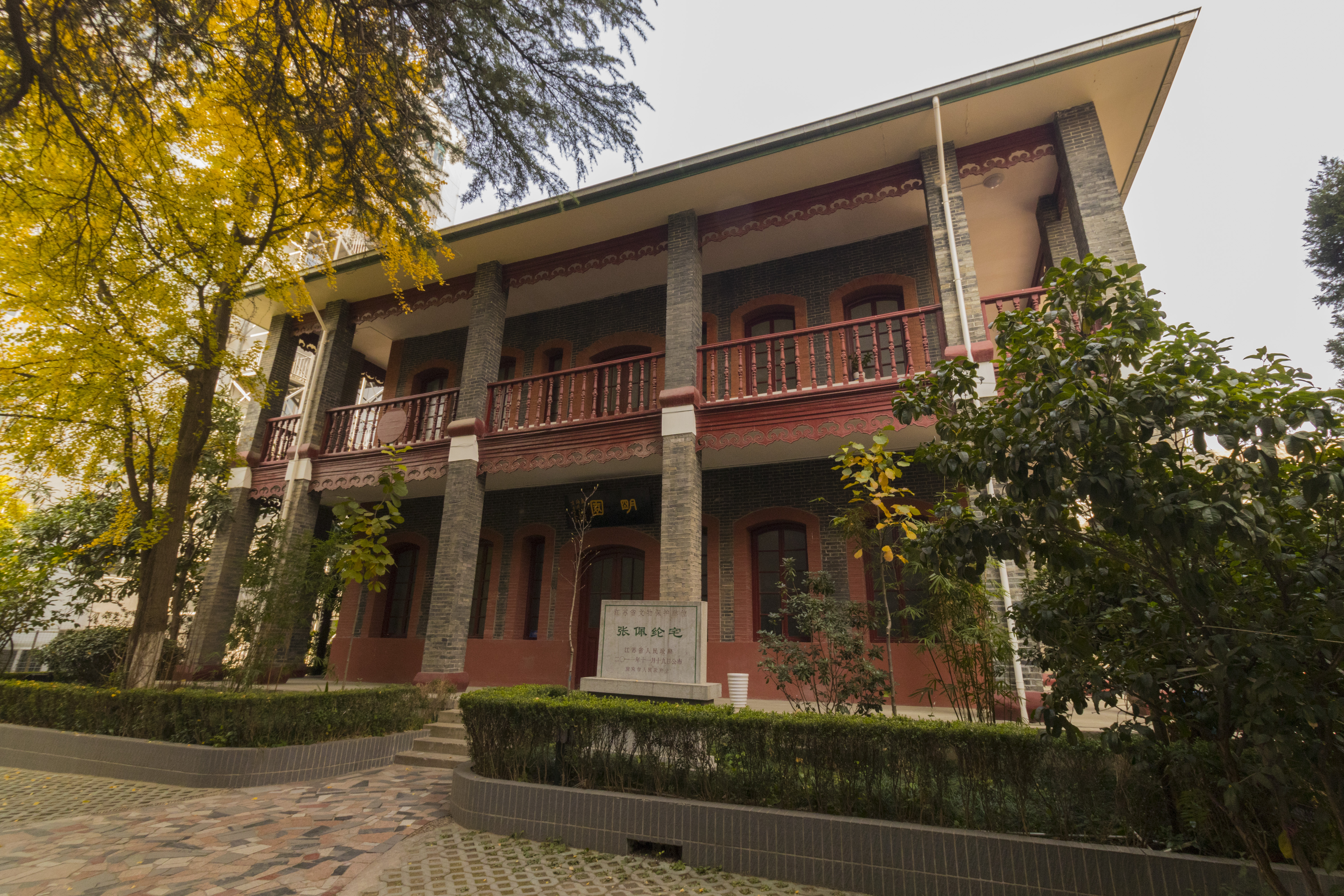
Former Legislative Yuan building in Nanjing, 1928 (seen in 2017).

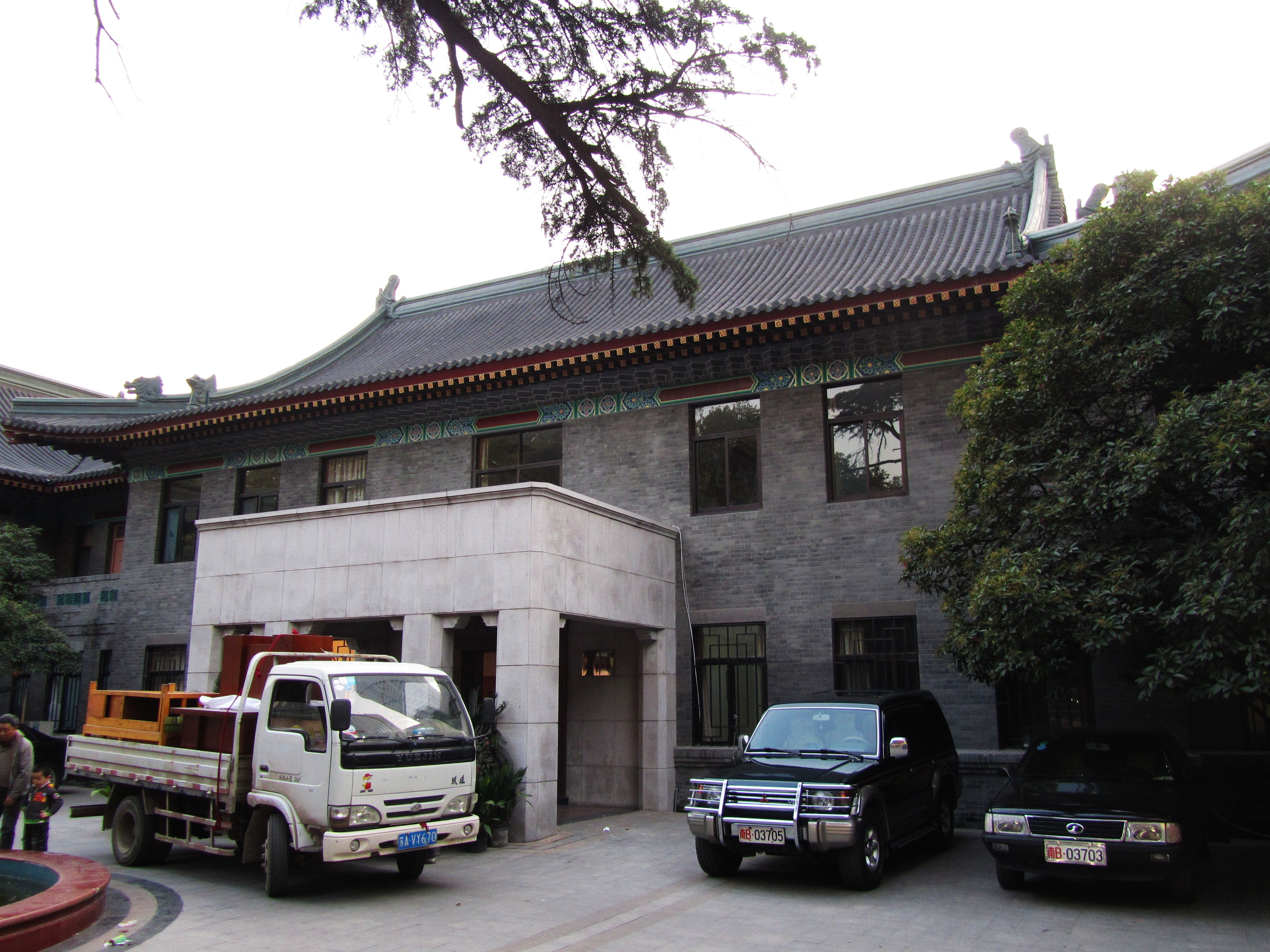
Former Legislative Yuan and Control Yuan building in Nanjing, 1946–1949 (seen in 2011).

The original Legislative Yuan was formed in the original capital of Nanjing after the completion of the Northern Expedition. Its 51 members were appointed to a term of two years. The 4th Legislative Yuan under this period had its members expanded to 194, and its term in office was extended to 14 years because of the Second Sino-Japanese War (1937–1945). According to KMT political theory, these first four sessions marked the period of political tutelage.

The current Constitution of the Republic of China came into effect on 25 December 1947, and the first Legislative session convened in Nanjing on 18 May 1948, with 760 members. Six preparatory meetings had been held on 8 May 1948, during which Sun Fo and Chen Li-fu were elected president and vice president of the body. In 1949, mainland China fell to the Communist Party and the Legislative Yuan (along with the entire ROC government) was transplanted to Taipei. On 24 February 1950, 380 members convened at the Sun Yat-sen Hall in Taipei.

The first Legislative Yuan was to have been elected for a term of three years ending in 1951; however, the fall of mainland China made it impossible to hold new elections. As a result, the Judicial Yuan decided that the members of the Legislative Yuan would continue to hold office until new elections could be held on the Mainland. This decision was made in the belief that the KMT would retake the Mainland in a short time. However, over the years, as the prospect of regaining the Mainland diminished, this meant that the legislators from mainland districts (and members of the ruling KMT) held their seats for life, in a one-party system. The body thus came to be called "the Non-reelected Congress".

Over the years, deceased members elected on the mainland were not replaced while additional seats were created for Taiwan starting with eleven seats in 1969. Fifty-one new members were elected to a three-year term in 1972, fifty-two in 1975, ninety-seven in 1980, ninety-eight in 1983, one hundred in 1986, and one hundred thirty in 1989. Although the elected members of the Legislative Yuan did not have the majority to defeat legislation, they were able to use the Legislative Yuan as a platform to express political dissent. Opposition parties were formally illegal until 1991, but in the 1970s candidates to the Legislative Yuan would run as Tangwai ("outside the party"), and in 1985 candidates began to run under the banner of the Democratic Progressive Party.

=== Democratization ===
The members of the Legislative Yuan with extended terms remained until 31 December 1991, when as part of subsequent Judicial Yuan ruling they were forced to retire and the members elected in 1989 remained until the 161 members of the Second Legislative Yuan were elected in December 1992. The third LY, elected in 1995, had 157 members serving 3-year terms. The fourth LY, elected in 1998, was expanded to 225 members in part to include legislators from the abolished provincial legislature of Taiwan Province. The Legislative Yuan greatly increased its prominence after the 2000 presidential elections in Taiwan when the Executive Yuan and presidency was controlled by the Democratic Progressive Party while the Legislative Yuan had a large majority of Kuomintang members. The legislative elections in late 2001 produced a contentious situation in which the pan-blue coalition has only a thin majority over the governing pan-green coalition in the legislature, making the passage of bills often dependent on the votes of a few defectors and independents. Because of the party situation there have been constitutional conflicts between the Legislative Yuan and the executive branch over the process of appointment for the premier and whether the president has the power to call a special session.

Amid 70% public support, the Legislative Yuan voted 217–1 on 23 August 2004 for a package of amendments to:

- Halve the number of seats from 225 to 113
- Switch to a single-member district parallel voting electoral system
- Increase the terms of members from 3 to 4 years, to synchronize the legislative and presidential elections. (The change was implemented for the next election cycle, as the legislative election was held in January 2008, and the presidential election followed in March.)

The new electoral system installed in 2008 includes 73 plurality seats (one for each electoral district), 6 seats for aboriginals, with the remaining 34 seats to be filled from party lists. Every county has a minimum of 1 electoral district, thereby guaranteed at least one seat in the legislature, while half of the proportionally represented seats drawn from party lists must be women.

Additionally, the Legislative Yuan proposed to abolish the National Assembly. Future amendments would still be proposed by the LY by a three-fourths vote from a quorum of at least three-fourths of all members of the Legislature. After a mandatory 180-day promulgation period, the amendment would have to be ratified by an absolute majority of all eligible voters of the ROC irrespective of voter turnout. The latter requirement would allow a party to kill a referendum proposal by asking that their voters boycott the vote as was done by the KMT with the referendums associated with the 2004 presidential election.

A DPP proposal to allow the citizens the right to initiate constitutional referendums was pulled off the table, due to a lack of support. The proposal was criticized for dangerously lowering the threshold for considering a constitutional amendment. Whereas a three-fourths vote of the LY would require that any proposed constitutional amendment have a broad political consensus behind it, a citizen's initiative would allow a fraction of the electorate to force a constitutional referendum. It was feared that allowing this to occur would result in a referendum on Taiwan independence which would likely result in a crisis with the People's Republic of China.

The Legislative Yuan also proposed to give itself the power to summon the president for an annual "state of the nation" address and launch a recall of the president and vice president (proposed by one fourth and approved by two thirds of the legislators and be submitted to a nationwide referendum for approval or rejection by majority vote). The Legislative Yuan will also have the power to propose the impeachment of the president or vice president to the Council of Grand Justices.

An ad hoc National Assembly was elected and formed in 2005 to ratify the amendments. The downsized Legislative Yuan took effect after the 2008 elections.

On 20 July 2007, the Legislative Yuan passed a Lobbying Act.

== Elections and terms ==
The Kuomintang-led government of the Republic of China retreated to Taiwan in 1949, the year following the first legislative elections (1948) after the enactment of the 1947 constitution. As the Kuomintang government continues to claim sovereignty over Mainland China, the term of the original legislators was extended until "re-election is possible in their original electoral districts." In response to the increasing democracy movement in Taiwan, limited supplementary elections were held in Taiwan starting from 1969 and parts of Fujian from 1972. Legislators elected in these supplementary elections served together with those who were elected in 1948. This situation remained until a Constitutional Court (Judicial Yuan) ruling on 21 June 1991 that ordered the retirement of all members with extended terms by the end of 1991.

Term	Length	Actual served	Election	Seats	Note
1st	Initially 3 years, then limit removed by Temporary Provisions	8 May 1948 – 31 January 1993 (See Note column for detailed terms)	1948 election	759	The only election held in mainland China. 8 seats were elected in Taiwan. 509 members retreated to Taiwan with the government; served until the end of 1991.
1st	Initially 3 years, then limit removed by Temporary Provisions	8 May 1948 – 31 January 1993 (See Note column for detailed terms)	1969 1st supp	11	Elected in Taiwan; terms equal to the 1948-elected members
1st	Initially 3 years, then limit removed by Temporary Provisions	8 May 1948 – 31 January 1993 (See Note column for detailed terms)	1972 2nd supp	51	Elected in the Free Area with 3-year terms.
1st	Initially 3 years, then limit removed by Temporary Provisions	8 May 1948 – 31 January 1993 (See Note column for detailed terms)	1975 3rd supp	52	Elected in the Free Area with 3-year terms; then extended to 5 years.
1st	Initially 3 years, then limit removed by Temporary Provisions	8 May 1948 – 31 January 1993 (See Note column for detailed terms)	1980 4th supp	97	Elected in the Free Area with 3-year terms.
1st	Initially 3 years, then limit removed by Temporary Provisions	8 May 1948 – 31 January 1993 (See Note column for detailed terms)	1983 5th supp	98	Elected in the Free Area with 3-year terms.
1st	Initially 3 years, then limit removed by Temporary Provisions	8 May 1948 – 31 January 1993 (See Note column for detailed terms)	1986 6th supp	100	Elected in the Free Area with 3-year terms.
1st	Initially 3 years, then limit removed by Temporary Provisions	8 May 1948 – 31 January 1993 (See Note column for detailed terms)	1989 7th supp	130	Elected in the Free Area with 3-year terms; served until 31 January 1993.
2nd	3 years	1 February 1993 – 31 January 1996	1992 election	161	Total re-election in the Free Area
3rd	3 years	1 February 1996 – 31 January 1999	1995 election	164	
4th	3 years	1 February 1999 – 31 January 2002	1998 election	225	
5th	3 years	1 February 2002 – 31 January 2005	2001 election	225	
6th	3 years	1 February 2005 – 31 January 2008	2004 election	225	
7th	4 years	1 February 2008 – 31 January 2012	2008 election	113	Introduced changes in the electoral system, term length, and seat numbers.
8th	4 years	1 February 2012 – 31 January 2016	2012 election	113	
9th	4 years	1 February 2016 – 31 January 2020	2016 election	113	
10th	4 years	1 February 2020 – 31 January 2024	2020 election	113	
11th	4 years	1 February 2024 – 31 January 2028	2024 election	113	Incumbent

Timeline of Legislative Yuan elections and terms

The legislature had 225 members during the 4th, 5th, and 6th terms. Legislators were elected as follows:

- 168 were elected by popular vote through single non-transferable vote in multi-member constituencies.
- 41 were elected on the basis of the proportion of nationwide votes received by participating political parties.
- 8 were allocated for overseas citizens and were selected by the parties on the basis of the proportion of votes received nationwide.
- 8 seats were reserved for the indigenous populations.

Since the 7th term, the 113 legislators are elected to office as follows:

- 73 are elected under the first-past-the-post system in single-member constituencies.
- 34 are elected under the supplementary member system on a second ballot, based on nationwide votes, and calculated using the largest remainder method by the Hare quota. Any party which receives 5% or more of the party vote can enter the parliament. For each party, at least half of the legislators elected under this system must be female.
- 6 seats are elected by indigenous voters through single non-transferable vote in two three-member constituencies.

== Composition by term ==
The Kuomintang (KMT) held a supermajority of seats in the Legislative Yuan between 1948 and 1991, while some seats were held by the Chinese Youth Party (CYP) and the China Democratic Socialist Party (CDSP). Through the limited supplementary elections held in since the 1970s, the Tangwai movement saw their share of seats increase. Most members in the Tangwai movement joined the Democratic Progressive Party (DPP) after its founding in the late 1980s.

Majority Plurality only Largest minority

Term	Majority (Note: Beginning of term)				Speaker	Minority				Total seats
Term	Party	Party leader	Caucus leader	Seats	Speaker	Seats	Caucus leader	Party leader	Party	Total seats
1st (1992)	KMT	Lee Teng-hui		94	Liu Sung-pan	21		Hsu Hsin-liang	DPP	130
1st (1992)	KMT	Lee Teng-hui		94	Liu Sung-pan	1	—N/a		CYP	130
2nd	KMT	Lee Teng-hui		95	Liu Sung-pan	51	Shih Ming-teh	Hsu Hsin-liang (1992–1993); Shih Ming-teh (1993–1995)	DPP	162
2nd	KMT	Lee Teng-hui		95	Liu Sung-pan	1	—N/a	Ju Gau-jeng	CSDP	162
3rd	KMT	Lee Teng-hui		85	Liu Sung-pan	54	Shih Ming-teh	Shih Ming-teh (1995–1996); Hsu Hsin-liang (1996–1998); Lin Yi-hsiung (1998)	DPP	164
3rd	KMT	Lee Teng-hui		85	Liu Sung-pan	21	Chou Yang-shan	Chen Kuei-miao	NP	164
4th	KMT	Lee Teng-hui (1998–2000); Lien Chan (2000–2001)	Hong Yuh-chin	123	Wang Jin-pyng	70	Shih Ming-teh	Lin Yi-hsiung (1998–2000); Frank Hsieh (2000–2001)	DPP	225
4th	KMT	Lee Teng-hui (1998–2000); Lien Chan (2000–2001)	Hong Yuh-chin	123	Wang Jin-pyng	11	Hsieh Chi-ta (2001)	Chou Yang-shan	NP	225
4th	KMT	Lee Teng-hui (1998–2000); Lien Chan (2000–2001)	Hong Yuh-chin	123	Wang Jin-pyng	4			DUT	225
4th	KMT	Lee Teng-hui (1998–2000); Lien Chan (2000–2001)	Hong Yuh-chin	123	Wang Jin-pyng	3	Yeh Hsien-hsiu		DNPA	225
4th	KMT	Lee Teng-hui (1998–2000); Lien Chan (2000–2001)	Hong Yuh-chin	123	Wang Jin-pyng	1	—N/a		NNA	225
4th	KMT	Lee Teng-hui (1998–2000); Lien Chan (2000–2001)	Hong Yuh-chin	123	Wang Jin-pyng	1	—N/a		TIP	225
5th	DPP	Frank Hsieh (2001–2002); Chen Shui-bian (2002–2004)	Ker Chien-ming	87	Wang Jin-pyng	68	Hong Yuh-chin	Lien Chan	KMT	225
5th	DPP	Frank Hsieh (2001–2002); Chen Shui-bian (2002–2004)	Ker Chien-ming	87	Wang Jin-pyng	46	Chung Shao-ho	James Soong	PFP	225
5th	DPP	Frank Hsieh (2001–2002); Chen Shui-bian (2002–2004)	Ker Chien-ming	87	Wang Jin-pyng	13	Liao Pen-yen	Huang Chu-wen	TSU	225
5th	DPP	Frank Hsieh (2001–2002); Chen Shui-bian (2002–2004)	Ker Chien-ming	87	Wang Jin-pyng	1	—N/a	Yok Mu-ming	NP	225
6th	DPP	Su Tseng-chang (2005); Yu Shyi-kun (2006–2007); Chen Shui-bian (2007–2008)	Ker Chien-ming	89	Wang Jin-pyng	79	Tseng Yung-chuan	Lien Chan (2004–2005); Ma Ying-jeou (2005–2007); Wu Po-hsiung (2007); Chiang Pin-kung (2007); Wu Po-hsiung (2007–2008)	KMT	225
6th	DPP	Su Tseng-chang (2005); Yu Shyi-kun (2006–2007); Chen Shui-bian (2007–2008)	Ker Chien-ming	89	Wang Jin-pyng	34	Daniel Huang	James Soong	PFP	225
6th	DPP	Su Tseng-chang (2005); Yu Shyi-kun (2006–2007); Chen Shui-bian (2007–2008)	Ker Chien-ming	89	Wang Jin-pyng	12		Huang Chu-wen (2004); Shu Chin-chiang (2005–2006); Huang Kun-huei (2007–2008)	TSU	225
6th	DPP	Su Tseng-chang (2005); Yu Shyi-kun (2006–2007); Chen Shui-bian (2007–2008)	Ker Chien-ming	89	Wang Jin-pyng	6	Yen Ching-piao	Chang Po-ya	NPSU	225
6th	DPP	Su Tseng-chang (2005); Yu Shyi-kun (2006–2007); Chen Shui-bian (2007–2008)	Ker Chien-ming	89	Wang Jin-pyng	1	—N/a	Yok Mu-ming	NP	225
7th	KMT	Wu Po-hsiung (2008–2009); Ma Ying-jeou (2009–2012)	Tseng Yung-chuan (2008); Lin Yi-shih (2008–2012)	81→74 (Note: Due to by-elections)	Wang Jin-pyng	27→33	Ker Chien-ming	Chen Shui-bian (2008); Tsai Ing-wen (2008–2012)	DPP	113
7th	KMT	Wu Po-hsiung (2008–2009); Ma Ying-jeou (2009–2012)	Tseng Yung-chuan (2008); Lin Yi-shih (2008–2012)	81→74	Wang Jin-pyng	3		Lin Pin-kuan	NPSU	113
7th	KMT	Wu Po-hsiung (2008–2009); Ma Ying-jeou (2009–2012)	Tseng Yung-chuan (2008); Lin Yi-shih (2008–2012)	81→74	Wang Jin-pyng	0→1		—N/a	Indep.	113
7th	KMT	Wu Po-hsiung (2008–2009); Ma Ying-jeou (2009–2012)	Tseng Yung-chuan (2008); Lin Yi-shih (2008–2012)	81→74	Wang Jin-pyng	1	—N/a	James Soong	PFP	113
8th	KMT	Ma Ying-jeou (2012–2014); Wu Den-yih (2014–2015); Eric Chu Li-luan (2015–2016)	Lin Hung-chih (2012–2014); Alex Fai Hrong-tai (2014–2015); Lai Shyh-bao (2015–2016)	64→66 (Note: Due to changes in member affiliation)	Wang Jin-pyng	40	Ker Chien-ming	Tsai Ing-wen (2012); Su Tseng-chang (2012–2014); Tsai Ing-wen (2014–2016)	DPP	113
8th	KMT	Ma Ying-jeou (2012–2014); Wu Den-yih (2014–2015); Eric Chu Li-luan (2015–2016)	Lin Hung-chih (2012–2014); Alex Fai Hrong-tai (2014–2015); Lai Shyh-bao (2015–2016)	64→66	Wang Jin-pyng	3	Lisa Huang; Lai Chen-chang	Huang Kun-huei	TSU	113
8th	KMT	Ma Ying-jeou (2012–2014); Wu Den-yih (2014–2015); Eric Chu Li-luan (2015–2016)	Lin Hung-chih (2012–2014); Alex Fai Hrong-tai (2014–2015); Lai Shyh-bao (2015–2016)	64→66	Wang Jin-pyng	3→2 (Note: One member lost due to criminal charge)	Thomas Lee	James Soong	PFP	113
8th	Indep.	—N/a	Lin Hung-chih (2012–2014); Alex Fai Hrong-tai (2014–2015); Lai Shyh-bao (2015–2016)	1→0	Wang Jin-pyng	2→1	Thomas Lee	Lin Pin-kuan	NPSU	113
9th	DPP	Tsai Ing-wen (2016–2018); Cho Jung-tai (2019–2020)	Ker Chien-ming	68	Su Jia-chyuan	35	Lai Shyh-bao (2016); Liao Kuo-tung (2016–2017); Lin Te-fu (2017–2018); Johnny Chiang (2018–2019); Tseng Ming-chung (2019–2020)	Huang Min-hui (2016); Hung Hsiu-chu (2016–2017); Wu Den-yih (2017–2020)	KMT	113
9th	DPP	Tsai Ing-wen (2016–2018); Cho Jung-tai (2019–2020)	Ker Chien-ming	68	Su Jia-chyuan	5→3	Hsu Yung-ming	Huang Kuo-chang (2016–2019); Chiu Hsien-chih (2019); Hsu Yung-ming (2019–2020)	NPP	113
9th	DPP	Tsai Ing-wen (2016–2018); Cho Jung-tai (2019–2020)	Ker Chien-ming	68	Su Jia-chyuan	3	Lee Hung-chun	James Soong	PFP	113
9th	Indep.	—N/a	Ker Chien-ming	1	Su Jia-chyuan	1	Lee Hung-chun	Lin Pin-kuan	NPSU	113
10th	DPP	Cho Jung-tai (2020); Tsai Ing-wen (2020–2022); William Lai (2023–2024)	Ker Chien-ming	61→62	Yu Shyi-kun	38→37	Lin Wei-chou (2020–2021); Alex Fai (2021–2022); Tseng Ming-chung (2022–2024)	Lin Jung-te (2020); Johnny Chiang (2020–2021); Eric Chu (2021–2024)	KMT	113
10th	DPP	Cho Jung-tai (2020); Tsai Ing-wen (2020–2022); William Lai (2023–2024)	Ker Chien-ming	61→62	Yu Shyi-kun	2→1	Lin Wei-chou (2020–2021); Alex Fai (2021–2022); Tseng Ming-chung (2022–2024)	—N/a	Indep.	113
10th	DPP	Cho Jung-tai (2020); Tsai Ing-wen (2020–2022); William Lai (2023–2024)	Ker Chien-ming	61→62	Yu Shyi-kun	5	Lai Hsiang-lin	Ko Wen-je	TPP	113
10th	DPP	Cho Jung-tai (2020); Tsai Ing-wen (2020–2022); William Lai (2023–2024)	Ker Chien-ming	61→62	Yu Shyi-kun	3	Chiu Hsien-chih	Hsu Yung-ming (2020); Chiu Hsien-chih (2020); Kao Yu-ting (2020); Chen Jiau-hua (2020–2023); Claire Wang (2023–2024)	NPP	113
10th	DPP	Cho Jung-tai (2020); Tsai Ing-wen (2020–2022); William Lai (2023–2024)	Ker Chien-ming	61→62	Yu Shyi-kun	1→0 (Note: Recalled)	—N/a	Chen Yi-chi	TSP	113
10th	Indep.	—N/a	Ker Chien-ming	2	Yu Shyi-kun	1→2	—N/a	—N/a	Indep.	113
11th	KMT	Eric Chu (2024–2025) Cheng Li-wun (2025–Present）	Fu Kun-chi	52→53	Han Kuo-yu	51	Ker Chien-ming	William Lai	DPP	113
11th	Indep.	—N/a	Fu Kun-chi	2→1	Han Kuo-yu	8	Huang Kuo-chang(2024-2026) Chen Ching-lung （2026-Present）	Ko Wen-je (2024–2025) Huang Kuo-chang（2025–Present）	TPP	113

== Issues ==
=== Protests and occupation ===
On 18 March 2014, the Legislative Yuan was occupied by protesting students.

=== Legislative violence ===
Much of the work of the Legislative Yuan is done via legislative committees, and a common sight on Taiwanese television involves officials of the executive branch answering extremely hostile questions from opposition members in committees. In the 1990s, there were a number of cases of violence breaking out on the floor, usually triggered by some perceived unfair procedure ruling, but in recent years, these have become less common. There was a brawl involving 50 legislators in January 2007 and an incident involving 40 legislators on 8 May 2007 when a speaker attempted to speak about reconfiguring the Central Election Committee. It has been alleged that fights are staged and planned in advance. These antics led the scientific humor magazine Annals of Improbable Research to award the Legislative Yuan its Ig Nobel Peace Prize in 1995 "for demonstrating that politicians gain more by punching, kicking and gouging each other than by waging war against other nations". On 29 June 2020 more than 20 lawmakers affiliated with the Kuomintang took over the legislature over night, blocking entry to the main chamber with chains and chairs, saying the government was trying to force through legislation and demanding the president withdraw the nomination of a close aide to a high-level watchdog. Democratic Progressive Party lawmakers forced themselves in while there were scuffles and shouting with Kuomintang lawmakers. On 18 May 2024, a lawmaker attempted to steal a bill in an attempt to prevent it from being passed. This resulted in a brawl on the chamber floor due to the chaos.

== Building ==
The current Legislative Yuan building in Taipei, was formerly the Taihoku Prefectural Taihoku Second Girls' High School (台北州立台北第二高等女學校) constructed during the Japanese colonial rule since 1960 with the administrative offices previously a dormitory. Over the years, there were several proposals to relocate the Legislative Yuan. The 1990 proposal to move the legislature to the location of the defunct Huashan station, was passed in 1992, then abandoned after the budget was cut. A second proposal in 1999 suggested that the legislature move to what had previously served as Air Force Command Headquarters. This proposition was opposed by the Taipei City Council and funds for disaster relief became a priority after the Jiji earthquake. Other relocation proposals include moving the parliament to Taichung, New Taipei, Changhua County, or Yilan County. In 2022, graduate students from several Taiwanese universities were invited to submit designs for a new building.

== Gallery ==
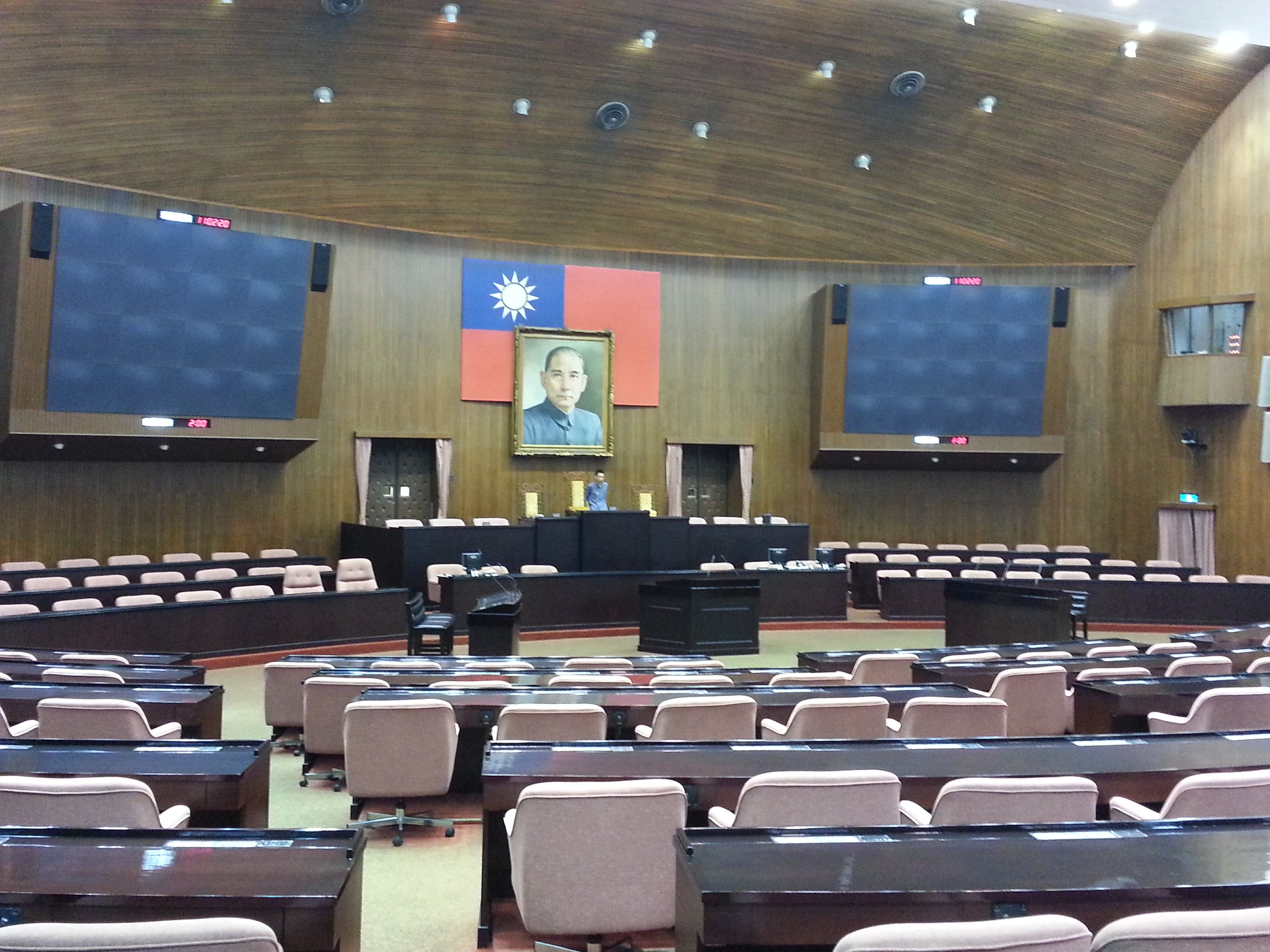
The chamber of the Legislative Yuan

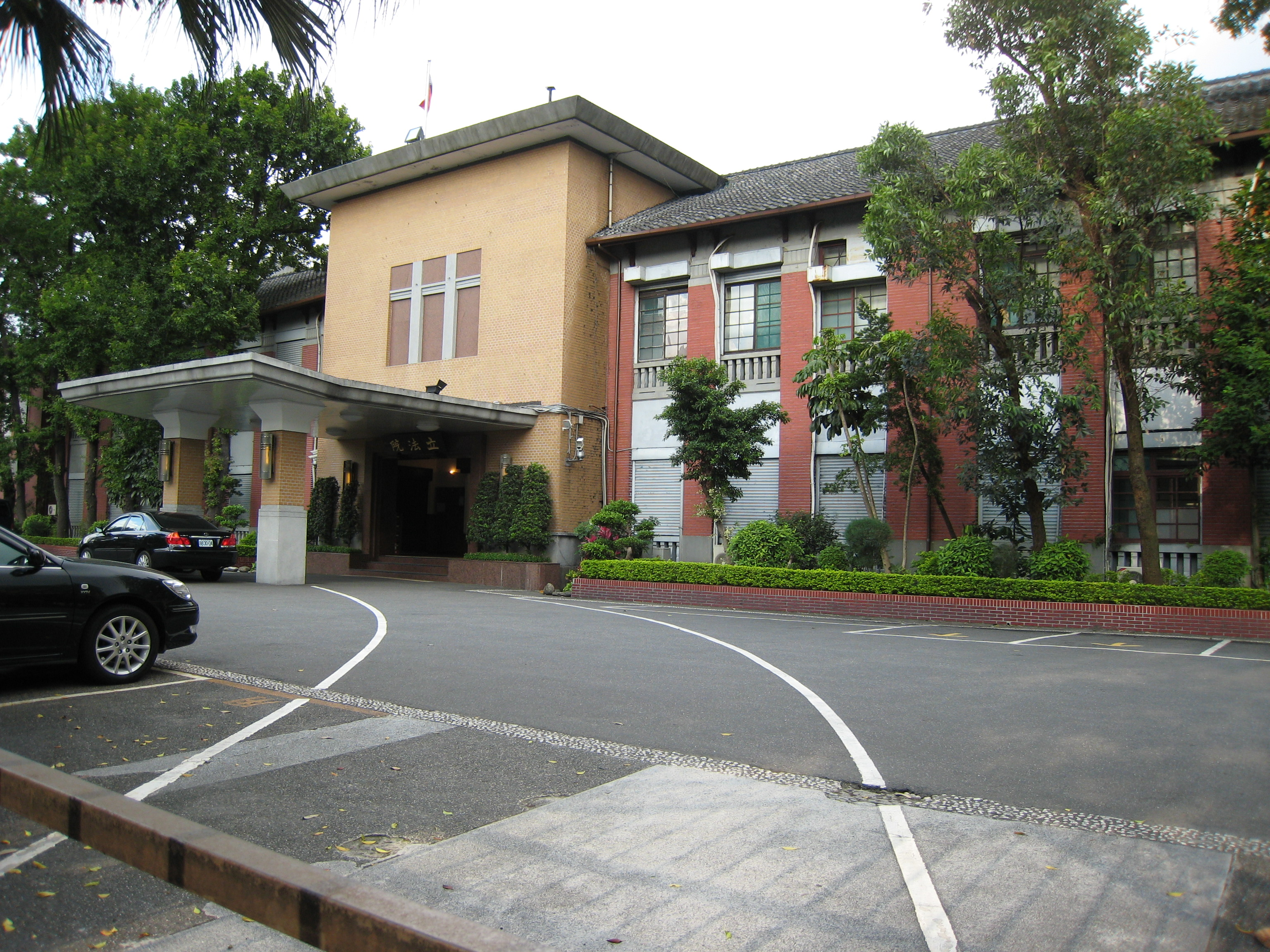
Legislative Yuan building

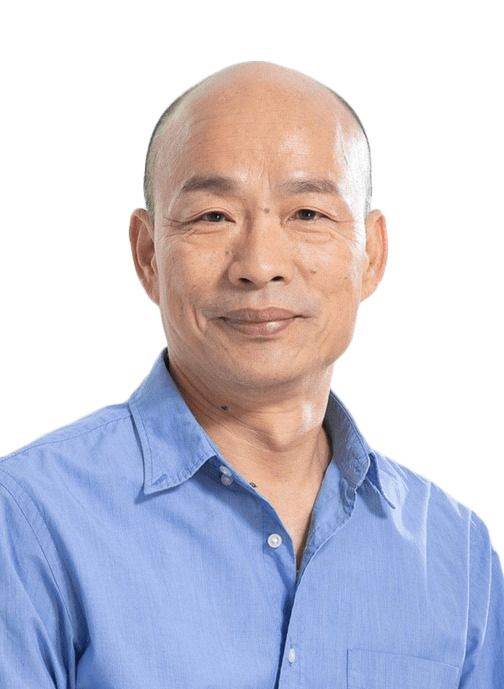
Han Kuo-yu, the current president of the Legislative Yuan

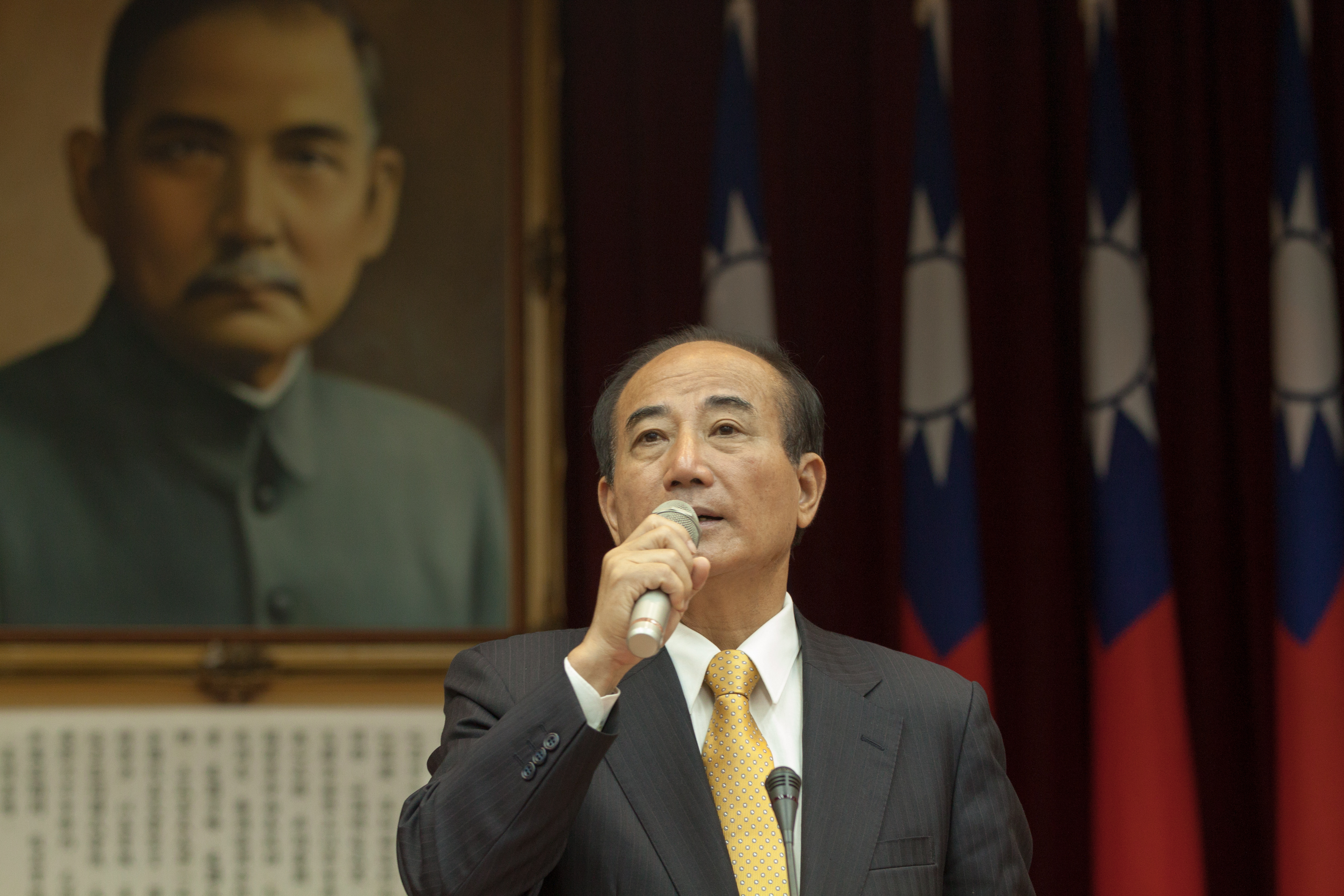
Wang Jin-pyng, the longest-serving president of the Legislative Yuan

== See also ==
- 11th Legislative Yuan
- History of the Republic of China
- Legislative violence
- List of Ig Nobel Prize winners
- Politics of the Republic of China

== Controversies and Related Events ==
=== Chaotic Image of the Legislative Yuan in Media ===
Since 1988, legislators cannot be held responsible for what they say and their personal security is heavily protected, a special power conferred by the citizens, but this caused multiple incidents where legislators assaulted each other.

=== Receival of the Ig Nobel Peace Prize ===
On October 6, 1995, the 5th Ig Nobel Peace Prize was awarded to the Legislative Yuan, in recognition of its demonstration that assaulting other legislators could in return generate better results than other countries resolving to war.

=== Challenging Credential-Based Privileges ===
In 2012, following widespread media coverage regarding the issuance of Legislative Yuan identification and parking permits, concerns arose that criminals were using them to evade police prosecution and that members of the public were exploiting them to enjoy special privileges.

=== Occupation of the Legislative Yuan ===
On March 18th, 2014, the Legislative Yuan passed the Cross-Strait Service Trade Agreement, or the CSSTA. As a result, 200 students occupied the Legislative Yuan on the evening the same day as a protest.

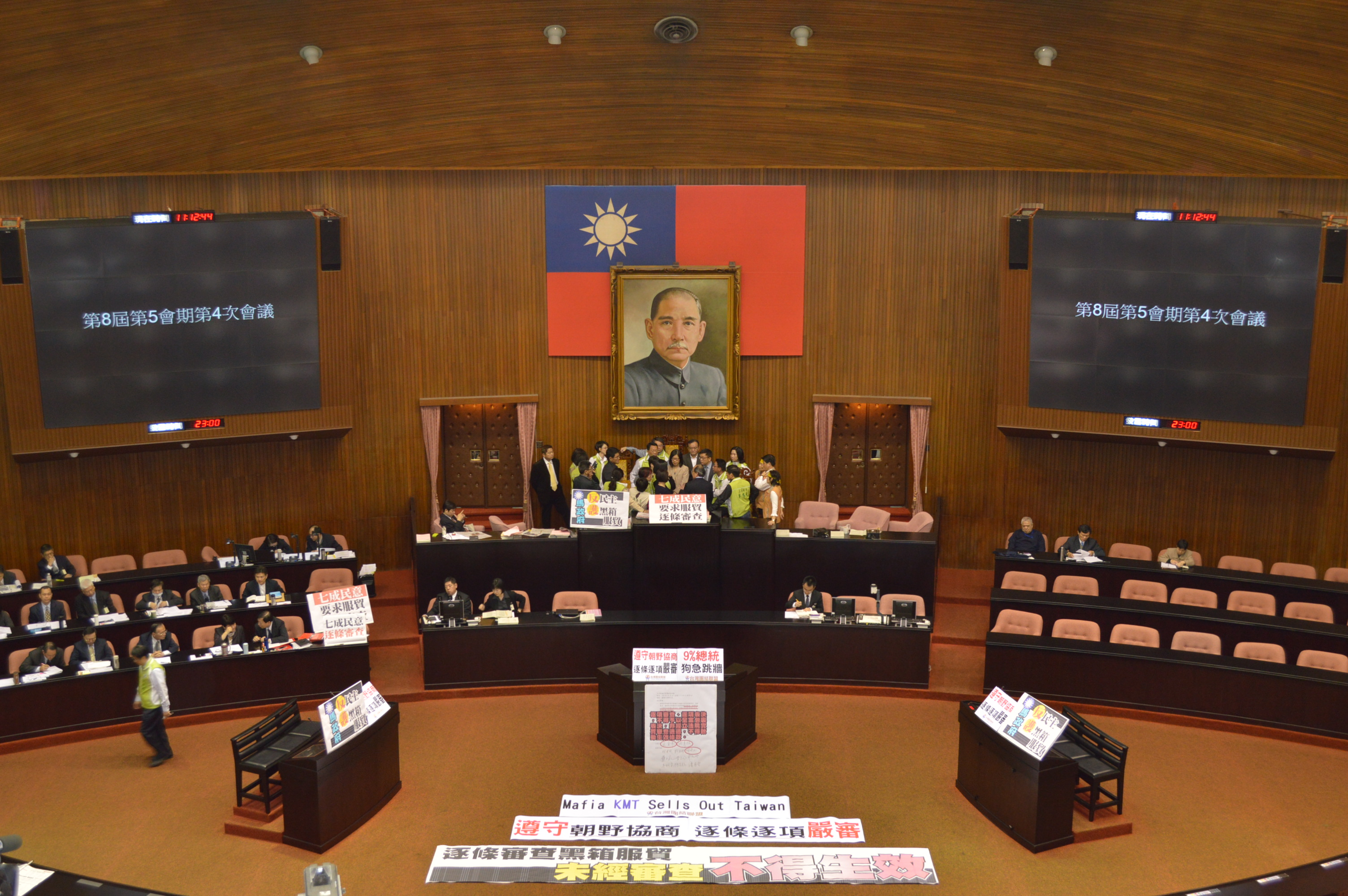
Before the occupation of the Legislative Yuan, legislators passed the CSSTA.

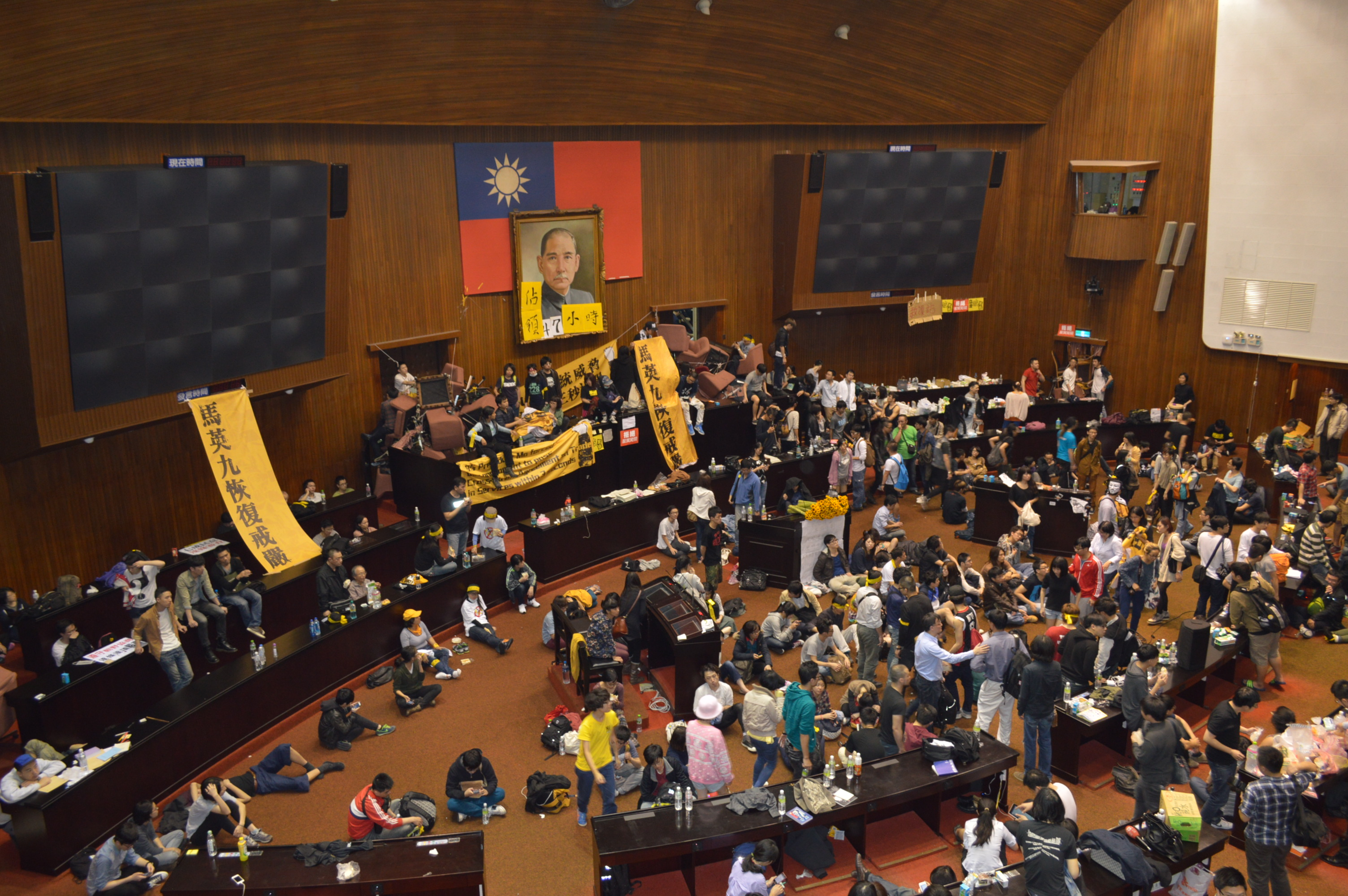
During the occupation led by the "Sunflower Soldiers", students and public supporters occupied the Legislative Yuan.
