= Legislative Yuan constituencies in Nantou County =

Nantou County
- 2 Single-member constituency for the Legislative Yuan
- District(s): Nantou County
- Electorate: 413,222

Current constituency
- Created: 2008
- Number of members: 2

Nantou County legislative districts (Chinese: 南投縣選舉區) consist of 2 single-member constituencies, each represented by a member of the Republic of China Legislative Yuan.

== Current districts ==
- Nantou County Constituency 1 - Puli, Caotun, Zhongliao, Yuchi, Guoxing, Ren'ai Townships
- Nantou County Constituency 2 - Nantou City, Mingjian, Jiji, Zhushan, Lugu, Shuili, Xinyi Townships
Nantou County Constituency 1

Nantou County Constituency 2

== Legislators ==
Kuomintang Democratic Progressive Party

| Election | Nantou County 1 | Nantou County 2 |
|---|---|---|
| 2008 7th | Wu Den-yih (2008-2009)^{1} | Lin Ming-chen (2008-2015)^{2} |
| 2009 by-election | Ma Wen-chun | Lin Ming-chen (2008-2015)^{2} |
| 2012 8th | Ma Wen-chun | Lin Ming-chen (2008-2015)^{2} |
| 2015 by-election | Ma Wen-chun | Hsu Shu-hua |
| 2016 9th | Ma Wen-chun | Hsu Shu-hua |
| 2020 10th | Ma Wen-chun | Hsu Shu-hua |
| 2023 10th | Ma Wen-chun | Frida Tsai |
| 2024 11th | Ma Wen-chun | Yu Hao |

Wu Den-yih resigned in 2009 to take office as Premier of the Republic of China under the Ma administration.

Lin Ming-chen resigned in 2015 after elected Nantou County magistrate.
