= Nantou County Constituency 2 =

Constituency of the Legislative Yuan of Taiwan

- Single-member constituency for the Legislative Yuan
- District(s): Nantou City, Zhushan, Jiji, Mingjian, Lugu, Shuili, Xinyi
- Electorate: 198,325 (2024 election)

Current constituency
- Created: 2008
- Party: KMT
- Member: Yu Hao

Nantou County Constituency 2 (Chinese: 南投縣第二選舉區) is one of the 73 regional constituencies represented in the Legislative Yuan, the national legislature of Taiwan. It was created in 2008 following a series of constitutional reforms, and elects one legislator, through first-past-the-post voting, to the Legislative Yuan. It has been represented by Yu Hao of the Kuomintang since 2024.

== Legislators ==
| Election | Legislator | Party |
|---|---|---|
| 2008–2015 | Lin Ming-chen | Kuomintang |
| 2015–2023 | Hsu Shu-hua | Kuomintang |
| 2023–2024 | Tsai Pei-hui | Democratic Progressive Party |
| 2024 | Yu Hao | Kuomintang |

== Election results ==

=== 2008 ===
2008 Taiwanese legislative election: Nantou County 2
| Candidate | Party | Votes | % |
|---|---|---|---|
| Lin Ming-chen | Kuomintang | 62,344 | 57.93 |
| Tang Huo-shen | Democratic Progressive Party | 44,397 | 41.26 |
| Chen Tsui-jung | Great Compassionate Salvation Party | 873 | 0.81 |
| Total | | 107,614 | 100.00 |
| Valid votes | | 107,614 | 98.78 |
| Invalid/blank votes | | 1,325 | 1.22 |
| Total votes | | 108,939 | 100.00 |
| Registered voters/turnout | | 201,707 | 54.01 |
| Majority | | 17,947 | 16.67 |
| Kuomintang win (new seat) | | | |

=== 2012 ===
* denotes the incumbent representative

2012 Taiwanese legislative election: Nantou County 2
| Candidate | Party | Votes | % | +/– |
|---|---|---|---|---|
| Lin Ming-chen* | Kuomintang | 79,008 | 54.32 | ▼3.61 |
| Lai Yen-hsueh | Democratic Progressive Party | 66,447 | 45.68 | ▲4.42 |
| Total | | 145,455 | 100.00 | – |
| Valid votes | | 145,455 | 98.58 | |
| Invalid/blank votes | | 2,094 | 1.42 | |
| Total votes | | 147,549 | 100.00 | |
| Registered voters/turnout | | 204,413 | 72.18 | |
| Majority | | 12,561 | 8.64 | |
| Kuomintang hold | | | | |

=== 2015 by-election ===
2015 Legislative Yuan by-election: Nantou County 2
| Candidate | Party | Votes | % | +/– |
|---|---|---|---|---|
| Hsu Shu-hua | Kuomintang | 38,694 | 51.12 | ▼3.20 |
| Tang Huo-shen | Democratic Progressive Party | 34,938 | 46.16 | ▲0.48 |
| Shi Jinfang | Independent | 2,060 | 2.72 | NEW |
| Total | | 75,692 | 100.00 | – |
| Valid votes | | 75,692 | 99.42 | |
| Invalid/blank votes | | 440 | 0.58 | |
| Total votes | | 76,132 | 100.00 | |
| Registered voters/turnout | | 205,390 | 37.07 | |
| Majority | | 3,756 | 4.96 | |
| Kuomintang hold | | | | |

=== 2016 ===
* denotes the incumbent representative

2016 Taiwanese legislative election: Nantou County 2
| Candidate | Party | Votes | % | +/– |
|---|---|---|---|---|
| Hsu Shu-hua* | Kuomintang | 73,485 | 56.65 | ▲5.53 |
| Tsai Huang-liang | Democratic Progressive Party | 56,237 | 43.35 | ▼2.81 |
| Total | | 129,722 | 100.00 | – |
| Valid votes | | 129,722 | 97.29 | |
| Invalid/blank votes | | 3,614 | 2.71 | |
| Total votes | | 133,336 | 100.00 | |
| Registered voters/turnout | | 204,977 | 65.05 | |
| Majority | | 12,248 | 13.3 | |
| Kuomintang hold | | | | |

=== 2020 ===
* denotes the incumbent representative

2020 Taiwanese legislative election: Nantou County 2
| Candidate | Party | Votes | % | +/– |
|---|---|---|---|---|
| Hsu Shu-hua* | Kuomintang | 80,067 | 54.83 | ▼1.82 |
| Chen Kuei-yu | Democratic Progressive Party | 59,322 | 40.62 | ▼2.73 |
| Wu Cheng-jui | Taiwan Statebuilding Party | 4,865 | 3.33 | NEW |
| Hsieh Fu-chuan | Interfaith Union | 978 | 0.67 | NEW |
| Wu Fen-tso | United Action Alliance | 800 | 0.55 | NEW |
| Total | | 146,032 | 100.00 | – |
| Valid votes | | 146,032 | 98.19 | |
| Invalid/blank votes | | 2,698 | 1.81 | |
| Total votes | | 148,730 | 100.00 | |
| Registered voters/turnout | | 202,828 | 73.33 | |
| Majority | | 20,745 | 14.21 | |
| Kuomintang hold | | | | |

=== 2023 by-election ===
2023 Legislative Yuan by-election: Nantou County 2
| Candidate | Party | Votes | % | +/– |
|---|---|---|---|---|
| Tsai Pei-hui | Democratic Progressive Party | 45,218 | 49.44 | ▲8.82 |
| Lin Ming-chen | Kuomintang | 43,293 | 47.34 | ▼7.49 |
| Chen Tsung-chien | Independent | 2,528 | 2.76 | NEW |
| Lu Yu-chun | National Justice Movement | 421 | 0.46 | NEW |
| Total | | 91,460 | 100.00 | – |
| Valid votes | | 91,460 | 99.45 | |
| Invalid/blank votes | | 504 | 0.55 | |
| Total votes | | 91,964 | 100.00 | |
| Registered voters/turnout | | 198,412 | 46.35 | |
| Majority | | 1,925 | 2.1 | |
| Democratic Progressive Party gain from Kuomintang | | | | |

=== 2024 ===
* denotes the incumbent representative

2024 Taiwanese legislative election: Nantou County 2
| Candidate | Party | Votes | % | +/– |
|---|---|---|---|---|
| Yu Hao | Kuomintang | 70,012 | 49.80 | ▲2.46 |
| Tsai Pei-hui* | Democratic Progressive Party | 66,551 | 47.34 | ▼2.10 |
| Chen Kuei-yu | Independent | 4,023 | 2.86 | NEW |
| Total | | 140,586 | 100.00 | – |
| Valid votes | | 140,586 | 98.38 | |
| Invalid/blank votes | | 2,316 | 1.62 | |
| Total votes | | 142,902 | 100.00 | |
| Registered voters/turnout | | 198,325 | 72.05 | |
| Majority | | 3,461 | 2.46 | |
| Kuomintang gain from Democratic Progressive Party | | | | |
