= 2025 Taiwanese recall votes =

Recall attempts against public officials

- 26 July 2025; 23 August 2025

31 (of 113) seats in the Legislative Yuan up for recall
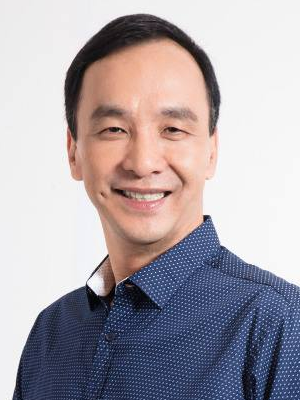
	First party
Leader	Eric Chu
Party	KMT
Seats before	52
Seats after	52
Seat change	Steady
- Map of Legislative Yuan constituencies with recall elections Recall unsuccessful Recall not held
Legislative Yuan before election
DPP minority
(6 seats short of majority)
Legislative Yuan after election
DPP minority
(6 seats short of majority)

The 2025 Taiwanese recall votes refer to recall votes in Taiwan against 31 members of the Legislative Yuan, one mayor, and one local councillor held in July and August 2025, predominately against politicians from the opposition Kuomintang (KMT) as a result of the massive petition known as the "Great Recall." The vote was framed by recall advocates as a push against the Chinese Communist Party and the People's Republic of China.

Under Taiwan's Public Officials Election and Recall Act, the recall vote would only pass if more than one-quarter of all eligible voters in the constituency cast favourable votes; when a recall is not passed, the same person cannot be recalled for the remainder of the term in office.

All attempts to recall members of the opposition KMT failed. Both the main wave of recall votes on 26 July and the second on 23 August were unsuccessful, with a majority of voters rejecting to recall them in each case.

== Background ==
The 2024 Taiwanese general election resulted in a Democratic Progressive Party (DPP) victory for the presidency, but failure to retain the control of the parliament, with the opposition Kuomintang (KMT) and Taiwan People's Party (TPP) winning a total of 62 seats (including the KMT's 52 seats, TPP's 8, and 2 KMT-aligned independents) in the 113-seat Legislative Yuan. Pro-government groups and politicians accused the opposition of undermining the country's constitutional order, slashing government spending, and weakening efforts to bolster defense capabilities against Chinese military threats. A massive wave of recalls, also known as "The Great Recall", was initiated by the Bluebird movement, aiming to secure a majority by the governing DPP in the parliament. Campaigners went further and framed the recalls as an effort to "oppose Communist China" and "defend Taiwan".

Under the Public Officials Election and Recall Act, 1% of eligible voters in a constituency is required at the first stage, and 10% at the second stage, to trigger a recall vote. Members elected through the party-list cannot be recalled.

Out of the 39 KMT constituency legislators, recall bids for 35 were filed, and 31 of which were established. KMT-affiliated groups attempted to recall 15 of the DPP's 38 directly elected MPs, but none were approved by the Central Election Commission due to insufficient signatures. The KMT accused the authorities for persecuting their members after around 100 members of the pan-blue coalition were charged with various crimes including forgery and breach of personal data law.

CEC said the cost of each legislator recall vote ranges from NT$16 million to NT$20 million.

== Results ==
Thirty-one members of the Legislative Yuan faced recall, all from the opposition KMT. They included caucus whip Fu Kun-chi and lawmakers across Taiwan. One mayor and one county councilor were also petitioned to be vacated.

Legislative Yuan members
Date	Politician	Party	Constituency	Result
26 July 2025	Jonathan Lin	KMT	Keelung City	Unsuccessful
26 July 2025	Wang Hung-wei	KMT	Taipei City III	Unsuccessful
26 July 2025	Lee Yen-hsiu	KMT	Taipei City IV	Unsuccessful
26 July 2025	Lo Chih-chiang	KMT	Taipei City VI	Unsuccessful
26 July 2025	Hsu Chiao-hsin	KMT	Taipei City VII	Unsuccessful
26 July 2025	Lai Shyh-bao	KMT	Taipei City VIII	Unsuccessful
26 July 2025	Hung Mong-kai	KMT	New Taipei City I	Unsuccessful
26 July 2025	Yeh Yuan-chih	KMT	New Taipei City VII	Unsuccessful
26 July 2025	Chang Chih-lun	KMT	New Taipei City VIII	Unsuccessful
26 July 2025	Lin Te-fu	KMT	New Taipei City IX	Unsuccessful
26 July 2025	Liao Hsien-hsiang	KMT	New Taipei City XII	Unsuccessful
26 July 2025	Niu Hsu-ting	KMT	Taoyuan City I	Unsuccessful
26 July 2025	Tu Chuan-chi	KMT	Taoyuan City II	Unsuccessful
26 July 2025	Lu Ming-che	KMT	Taoyuan City III	Unsuccessful
26 July 2025	Wan Mei-ling	KMT	Taoyuan City IV	Unsuccessful
26 July 2025	Lu Yu-lin	KMT	Taoyuan City V	Unsuccessful
26 July 2025	Chiu Jo-hua	KMT	Taoyuan City VI	Unsuccessful
26 July 2025	Cheng Cheng-chien	KMT	Hsinchu City	Unsuccessful
26 July 2025	Liao Wei-hsiang	KMT	Taichung City IV	Unsuccessful
26 July 2025	Huang Chien-hao	KMT	Taichung City V	Unsuccessful
26 July 2025	Lo Ting-wei	KMT	Taichung City VI	Unsuccessful
26 July 2025	Ting Hsueh-chung	KMT	Yunlin County I	Unsuccessful
26 July 2025	Fu Kun-chi	KMT	Hualien County	Unsuccessful
26 July 2025	Huang Chien-pin	KMT	Taitung County	Unsuccessful
23 August 2025	Ma Wen-chun	KMT	Nantou County I	Unsuccessful
23 August 2025	Yu Hao	KMT	Nantou County II	Unsuccessful
23 August 2025	Lo Ming-tsai	KMT	New Taipei City XI	Unsuccessful
23 August 2025	Lin Szu-ming	KMT	Hsinchu County II	Unsuccessful
23 August 2025	Yen Kuan-heng	KMT	Taichung City II	Unsuccessful
23 August 2025	Yang Chiung-ying	KMT	Taichung City III	Unsuccessful
23 August 2025	Johnny Chiang	KMT	Taichung City VIII	Unsuccessful

Mayor
Date	Politician	Party	City	Result
26 July 2025	Ann Kao	Independent	Hsinchu	Unsuccessful

Local councillor
Date	Politician	Party	Constituency	Result
13 July 2025	Chen Yu-ling	DPP	Nantou County IV	Unsuccessful

== Result breakdown ==
=== 13 July: Nantou councillor ===
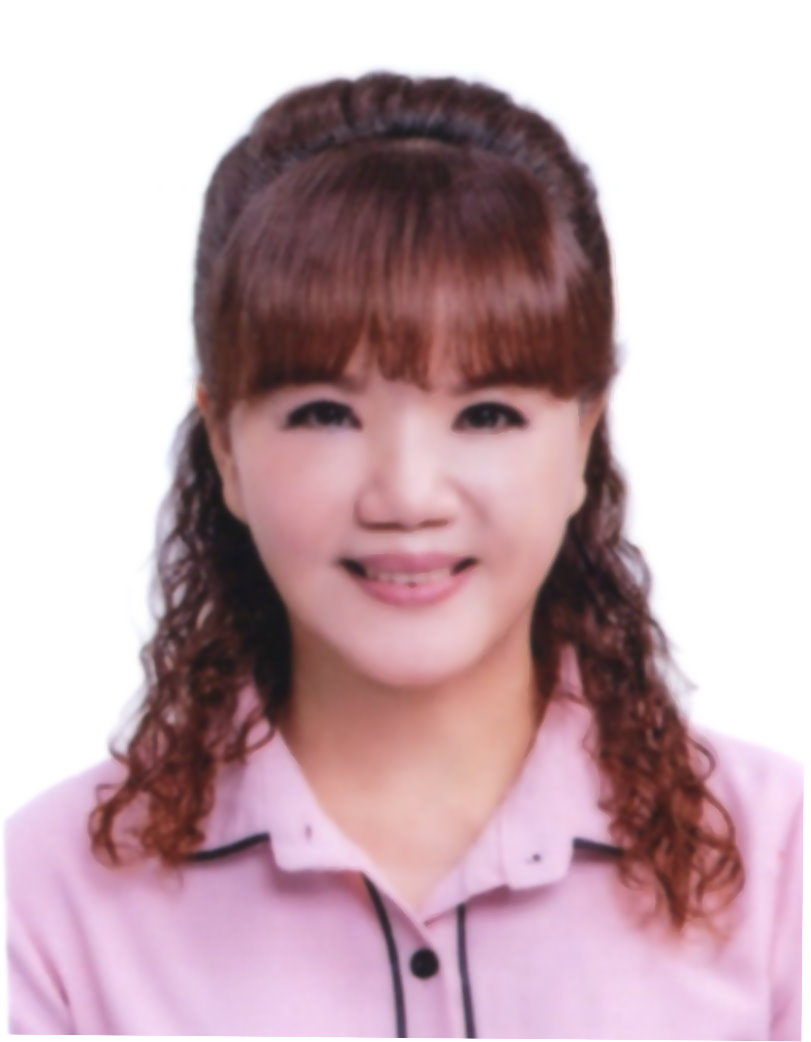
Chen Yu-ling

The first vote amidst the Great Recall campaign was led by Lin Ching-tung against Chen Yu-ling, a member of the Nantou County Council. Chen is also the sole politician from the DPP facing the threat of removal, and, as a result, decided not to campaign against her recall in order to avoid diverting the party's effort at other recall campaigns.

The vote was held on 13 July 2025. While the recall was supported by over 67% of the valid ballots cast, receiving 12,160 votes, it failed to pass the threshold of removal at 14,302 votes, which equates to one-quarter of all eligible voters of 57,207.

Recall of Chen Yu-ling
Choice	Votes	%
Support recall	12,160	67.45
Against recall	5,867	32.55
Total	18,027	100.00
Valid votes	18,027	99.21
Invalid/blank votes	144	0.79
Total votes	18,171	100.00
Registered voters/turnout	57,207	31.76
	Not recalled	

=== 26 July: Legislators ===
The first round of votes against Legislative Yuan members were held on 26 July 2025. All 24 members retained their seats and defeated the DPP's recall attempt, with only 7 of those bids passing the legal threshold (Wang Hung-wei, Lee Yen-hsiu, Hsu Chiao-hsin, Yeh Yuan-chih, Cheng Cheng-chien, Lo Ting-wei, Fu Kun-chi). Yeh's vote was the closest, with 3,560 votes short of unseating. The average turnout of the 26 July votes was over 55%, marking the highest amongst all recall votes held in Taiwan.

==== Keelung ====
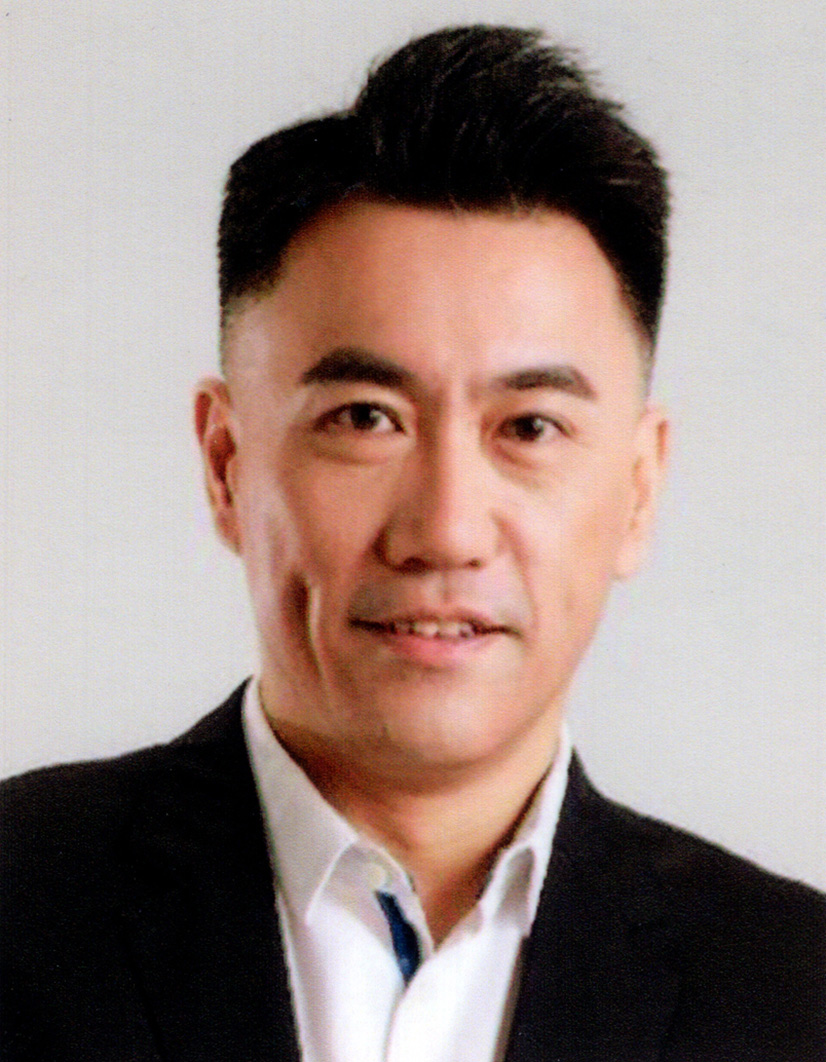
Jonathan Lin

In Keelung, lawmaker Jonathan Lin faces recall for, amongst multiple reasons, inciting parliamentary violence, lambasting civil servants and undermining national security, defaming civil groups that initiated the unseating campaign, and misogynistic behaviour. The bid was defeated by a majority of votes against and without reaching the necessary threshold of 75,995.

Recall of Jonathan Lin
Choice	Votes	%
Support recall	65,143	40.35
Against recall	96,294	59.65
Total	161,437	100.00
Valid votes	161,437	99.49
Invalid/blank votes	826	0.51
Total votes	162,263	100.00
Registered voters/turnout	303,980	53.38
	Not recalled	

==== Taipei ====
Five Taipei lawmakers were targeted in this round of votes. Wang Hung-wei and Hsu Chiao-hsin were considered the prime targets for their controversial comments in the past.

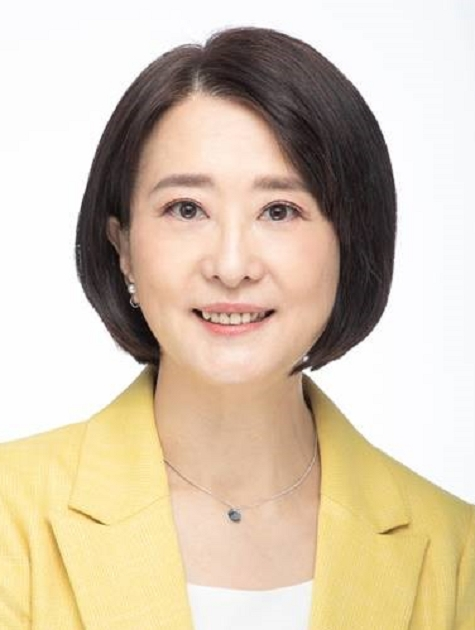
Wang Hung-wei

Wang was accused of undermining national security after meeting Chinese officials and groups responsible for or supporting "reunification with Taiwan". Her support of the 1992 consensus and minimizing the budget for state's security, apart from her alleged spread of misinformation, were also listed as evidence that amount to unseating. While the votes supporting the recall passed the threshold of 68,578, it was still defeated with 53% of votes against.

Recall of Wang Hung-wei
Choice	Votes	%
Support recall	76,463	46.97
Against recall	86,311	53.03
Total	162,774	100.00
Valid votes	162,774	99.59
Invalid/blank votes	678	0.41
Total votes	163,452	100.00
Registered voters/turnout	274,312	59.59
	Not recalled	

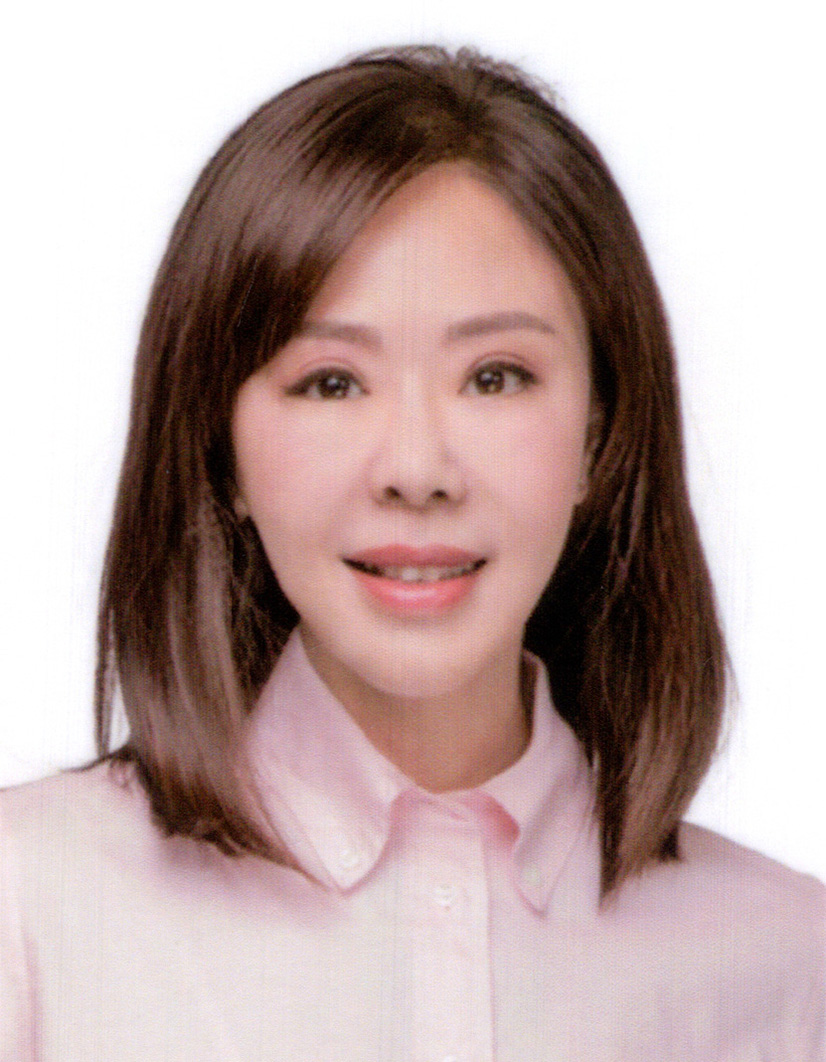
Lee Yen-hsiu

Lee Yen-hsiu, the vice secretary-general of Kuomintang, was filed with a recall proposal after supporting various Kuomintang-led proposals, including the controversial legislative reform. The recall was defeated by 57% of votes, despite votes in favor passing the threshold of 77,972.

Recall of Lee Yen-hsiu
Choice	Votes	%
Support recall	78,560	42.76
Against recall	105,169	57.24
Total	183,729	100.00
Valid votes	183,729	99.61
Invalid/blank votes	725	0.39
Total votes	184,454	100.00
Registered voters/turnout	311,887	59.14
	Not recalled	

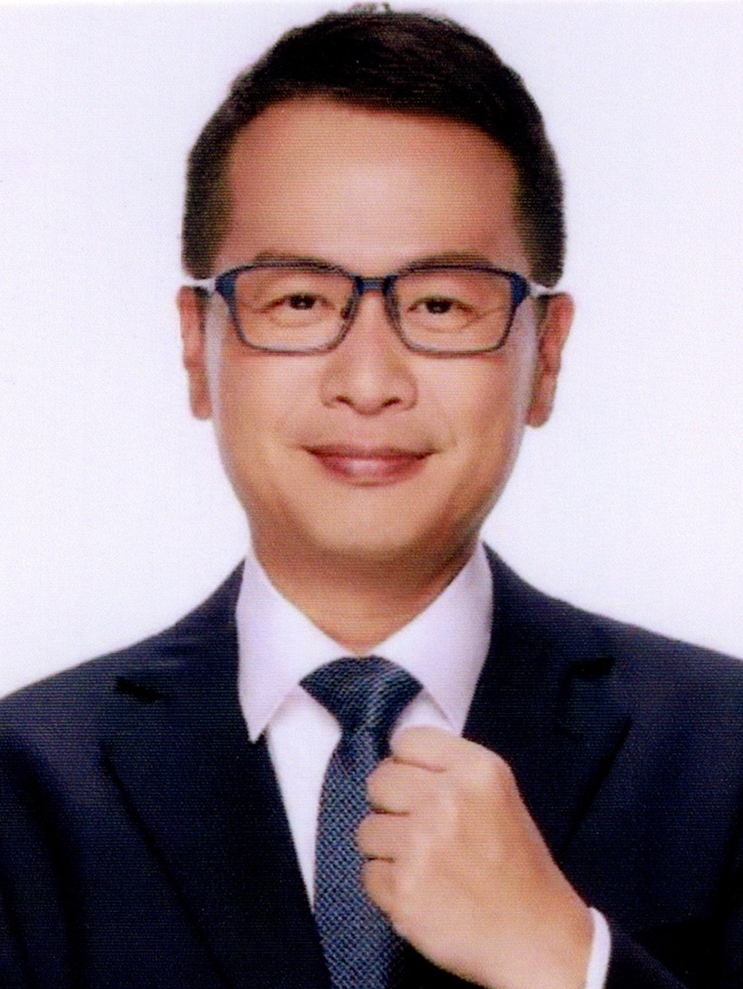
Lo Chih-chiang

Lo Chih-chiang was accused of similar breach of national security for his alleged pro-China stance, and his "opportunistic" and "discreditable" past. His recall bid was defeated by 57% of votes, without reaching the threshold of 57,246.

Recall of Lo Chih-chiang
Choice	Votes	%
Support recall	56,726	43.13
Against recall	74,808	56.87
Total	131,534	100.00
Valid votes	131,534	99.57
Invalid/blank votes	569	0.43
Total votes	132,103	100.00
Registered voters/turnout	228,981	57.69
	Not recalled	

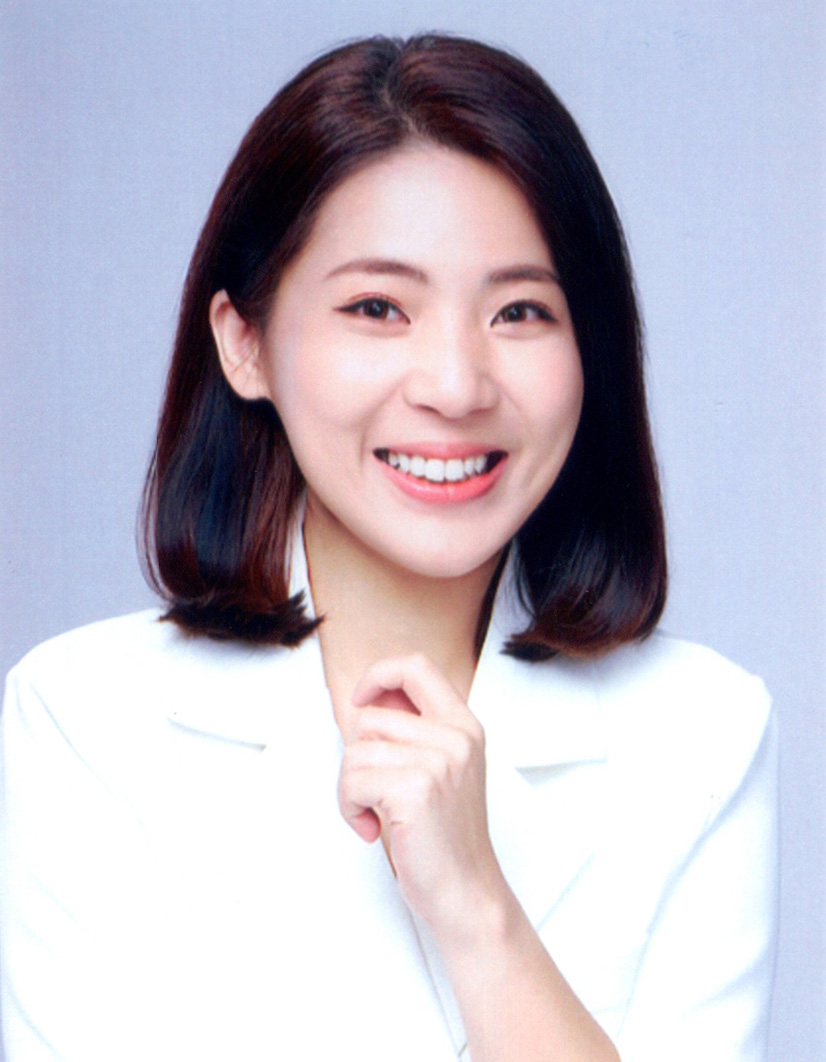
Hsu Chiao-hsin

The civil group that led Hsu Chiao-hsin's recall said she repeatedly used offensive languages and gestures, and was accused of leaking confidential documents concerning foreign relations, manipulating public opinion, and being involved in a fraud case of her family. She remained as lawmaker after 55% voted against her recall, although the supporting ballots passed the threshold of 57,785.

Recall of Hsu Chiao-hsin
Choice	Votes	%
Support recall	62,633	45.38
Against recall	75,401	54.62
Total	138,034	100.00
Valid votes	138,034	99.57
Invalid/blank votes	596	0.43
Total votes	138,630	100.00
Registered voters/turnout	231,139	59.98
	Not recalled	

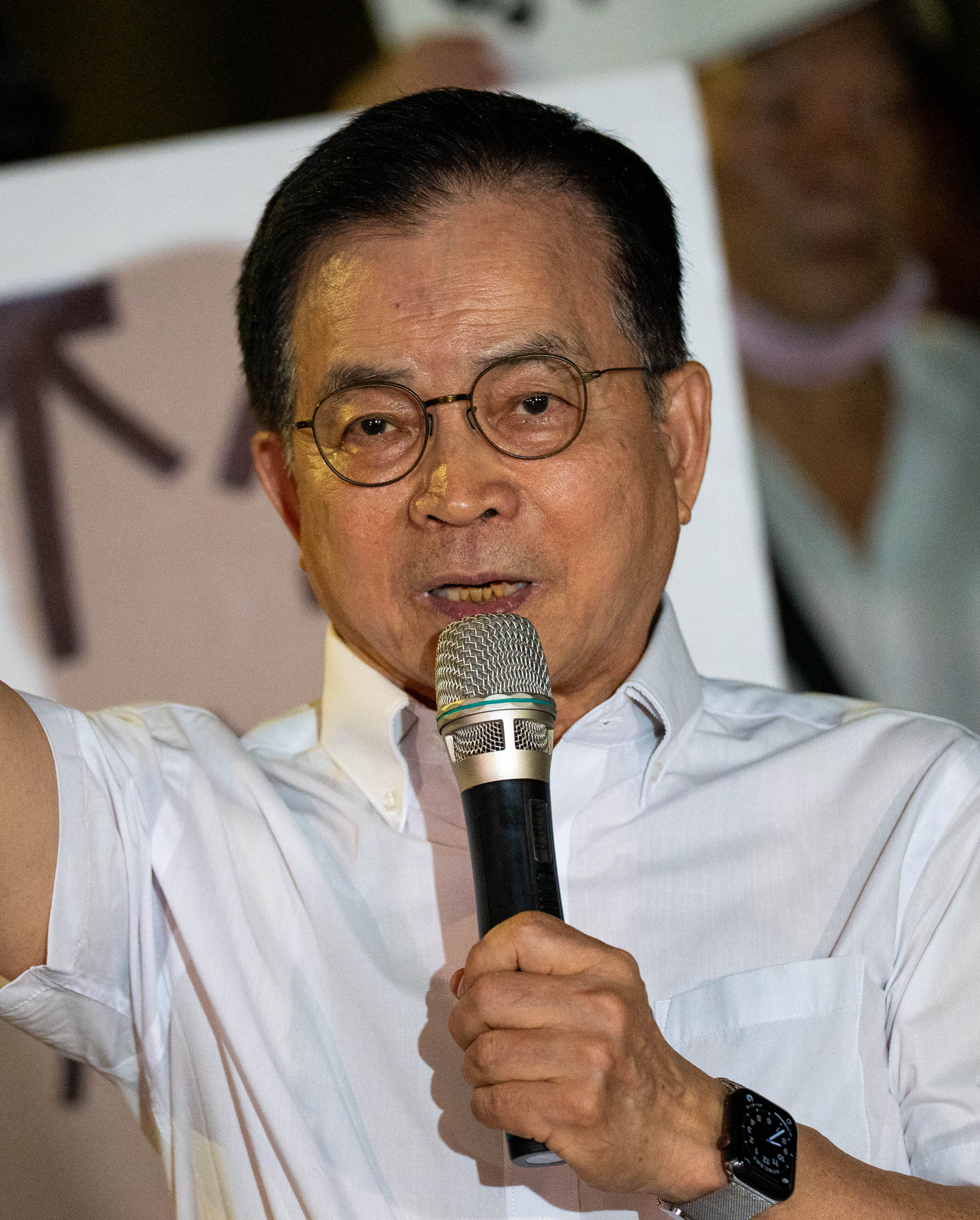
Lai Shyh-bao during a campaign against his recall

Lai Shyh-bao was alleged to have disrespected the standing order and barred other legislators from joining meetings by blocking the chamber door. He was also accused of assaulting multiple colleagues and supporting his party's proposals that amounted to paralyzing the government. His bid was defeated after only around 40% of votes support the recall, without passing the threshold of 61,189.

Recall of Lai Shyh-bao
Choice	Votes	%
Support recall	55,958	39.17
Against recall	86,907	60.83
Total	142,865	100.00
Valid votes	142,865	99.57
Invalid/blank votes	624	0.43
Total votes	143,489	100.00
Registered voters/turnout	244,753	58.63
	Not recalled	

==== New Taipei ====
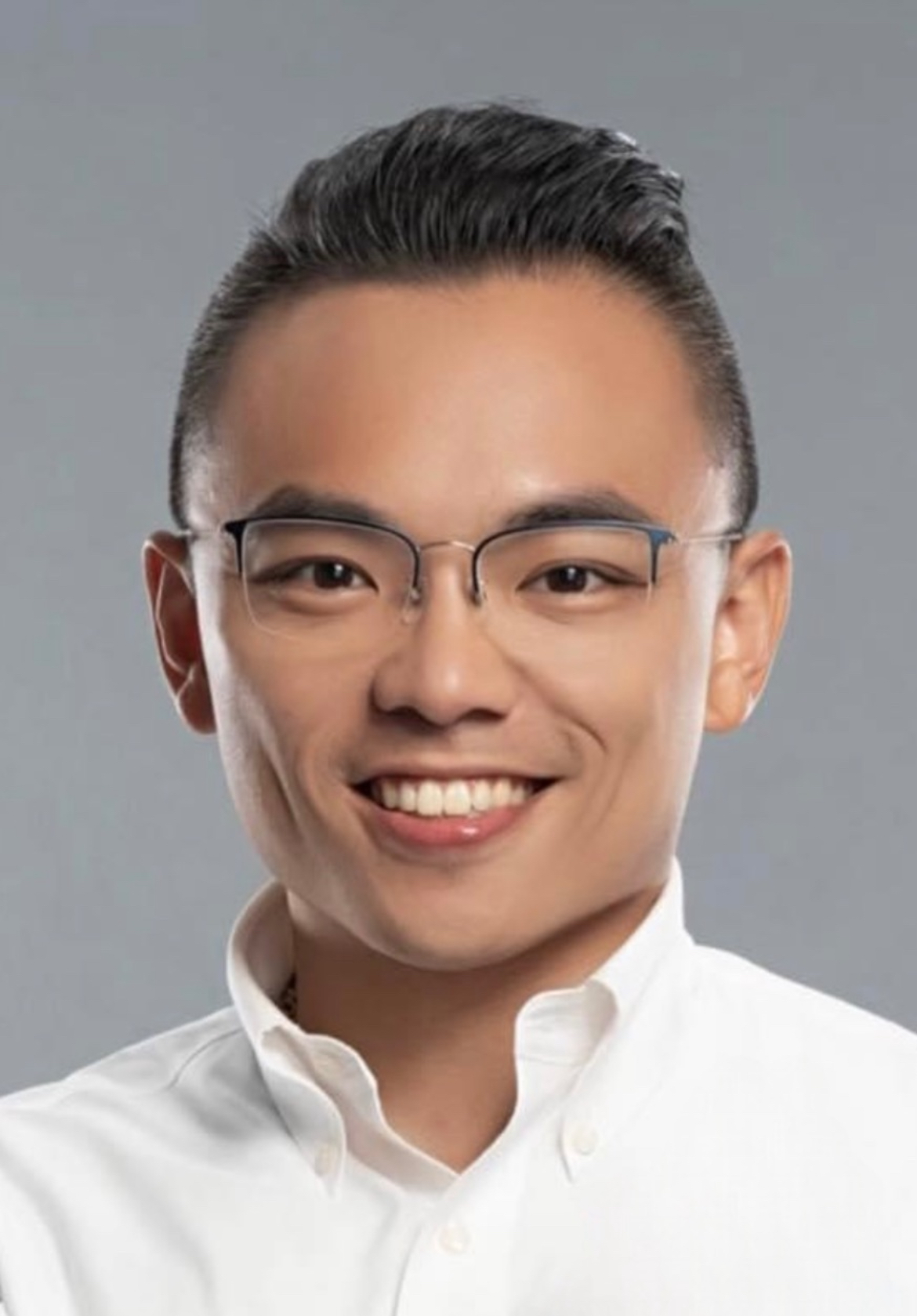
Hung Mong-kai

Hung Mong-kai, who was elected with the highest number of votes among candidates in the 2024 election, was accused of spreading unconfirmed information. His family was alleged to have close relation with pro-China forces. While he was supported to stay with 56% of votes (and the threshold of 101,265 was not met), Hung admitted that his support dropped massively after losing around 37,000 of the votes he won just a year ago, and agreed to listen to criticisms and advice he heard during the campaign.

Recall of Hung Mong-kai
Choice	Votes	%
Support recall	94,808	43.81
Against recall	121,592	56.19
Total	216,400	100.00
Valid votes	216,400	99.47
Invalid/blank votes	1,146	0.53
Total votes	217,546	100.00
Registered voters/turnout	405,060	53.71
	Not recalled	

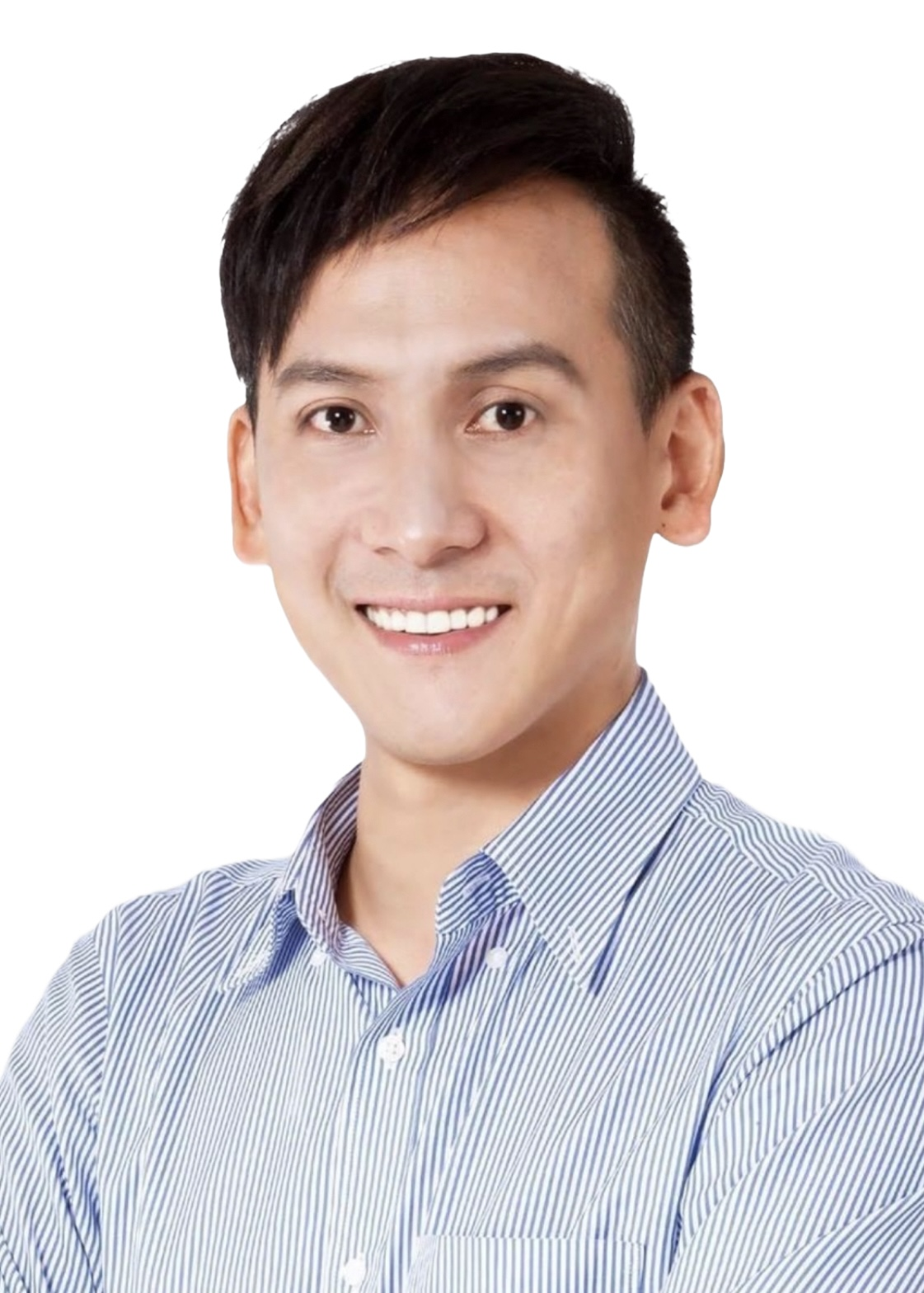
Yeh Yuan-chih

Among the other allegations that were raised against other Kuomintang MPs, Yeh Yuan-chih was also said to have been in breach of law after going live at a closed sitting of the Legislative Yuan. Yeh remained as lawmaker after only 48.6% of voters agreed he should be removed despite passing the threshold of 57,761.

Recall of Yeh Yuan-chih
Choice	Votes	%
Support recall	63,357	48.63
Against recall	66,917	51.37
Total	130,274	100.00
Valid votes	130,274	99.48
Invalid/blank votes	687	0.52
Total votes	130,961	100.00
Registered voters/turnout	231,042	56.68
	Not recalled	

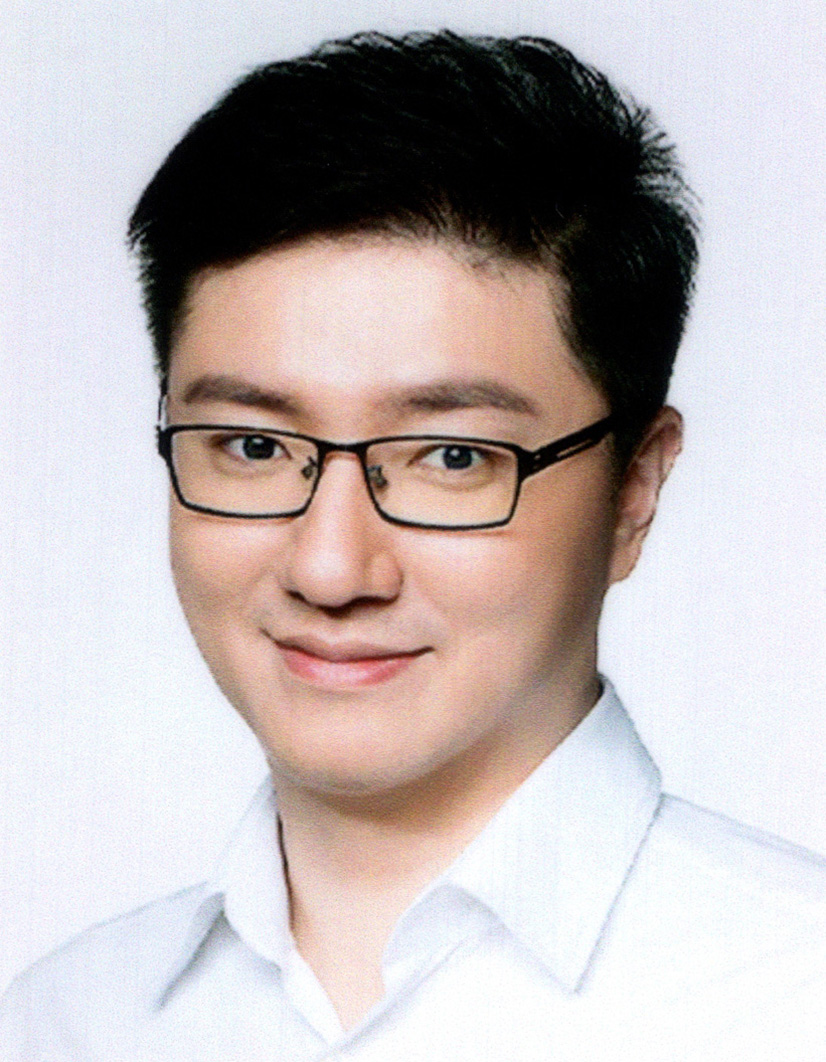
Chang Chih-lun

Chang Chih-lun was said to have gathered wealth by turning public resources for personal gains and colluding with local "tribal" forces. Chang was also alleged to have attempted to buy votes. His recall bid was defeated after only 41% of voters supported it, and votes in favor lagged behind the threshold of 72,073 as well.

Recall of Chang Chih-lun
Choice	Votes	%
Support recall	67,131	41.32
Against recall	95,319	58.68
Total	162,450	100.00
Valid votes	162,450	99.37
Invalid/blank votes	1,030	0.63
Total votes	163,480	100.00
Registered voters/turnout	288,291	56.71
	Not recalled	

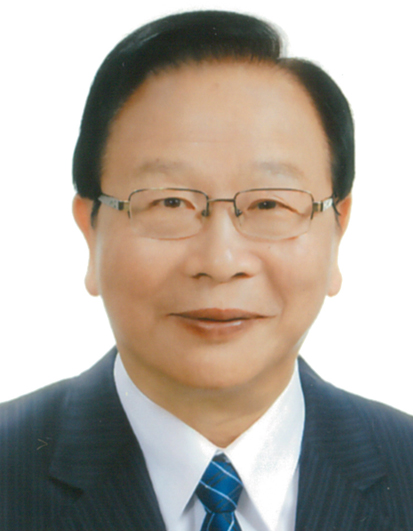
Lin Te-fu

Lin Te-fu's recall bid was defeated in a strong support to him after 62% of votes were against, in which the threshold to pass was 59,345.

Recall of Lin Te-fu
Choice	Votes	%
Support recall	51,484	38.04
Against recall	83,862	61.96
Total	135,346	100.00
Valid votes	135,346	99.47
Invalid/blank votes	715	0.53
Total votes	136,061	100.00
Registered voters/turnout	237,380	57.32
	Not recalled	

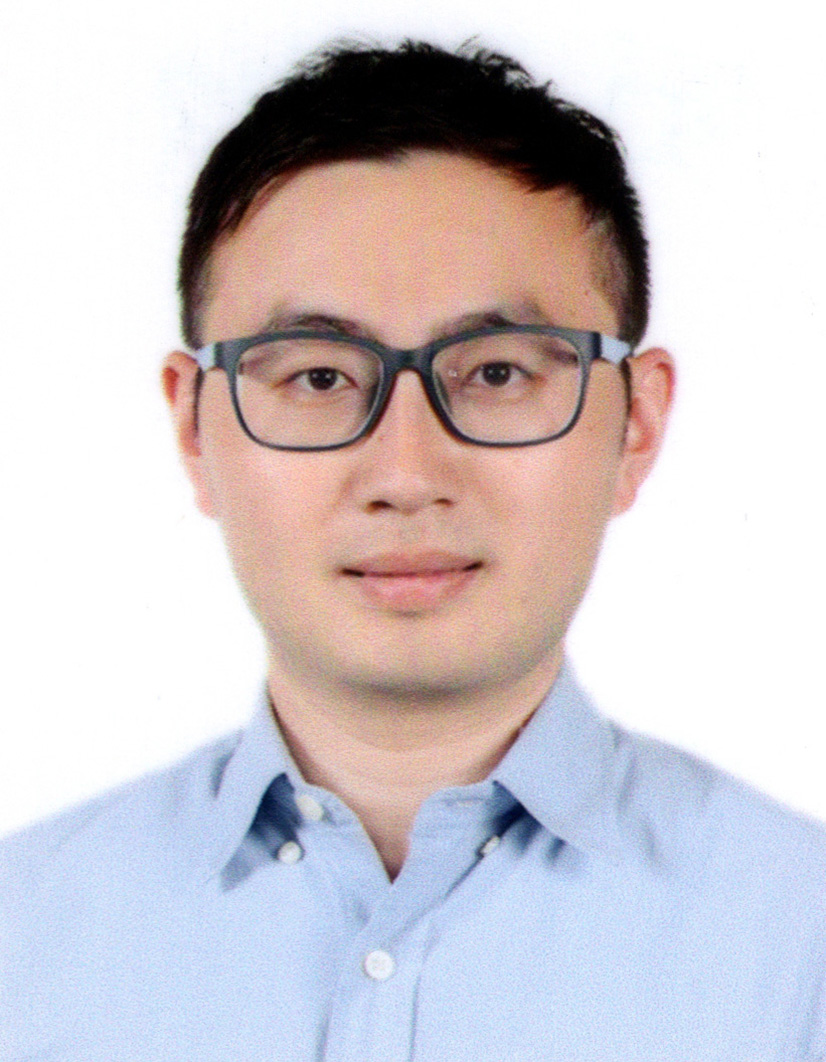
Liao Hsien-hsiang

Liao Hsien-hsiang was criticized for attacking other lawmakers during several parliamentary brawls and was indifferent to his constituency's development which was far behind nearby districts. Liao remained as lawmaker after 56% of voters wanted him to stay, while less than 66,561 voters, the threshold of the bid, agreed.

Recall of Liao Hsien-hsiang
Choice	Votes	%
Support recall	60,944	43.61
Against recall	78,798	56.39
Total	139,742	100.00
Valid votes	139,742	99.49
Invalid/blank votes	714	0.51
Total votes	140,456	100.00
Registered voters/turnout	266,243	52.75
	Not recalled	

==== Taoyuan ====
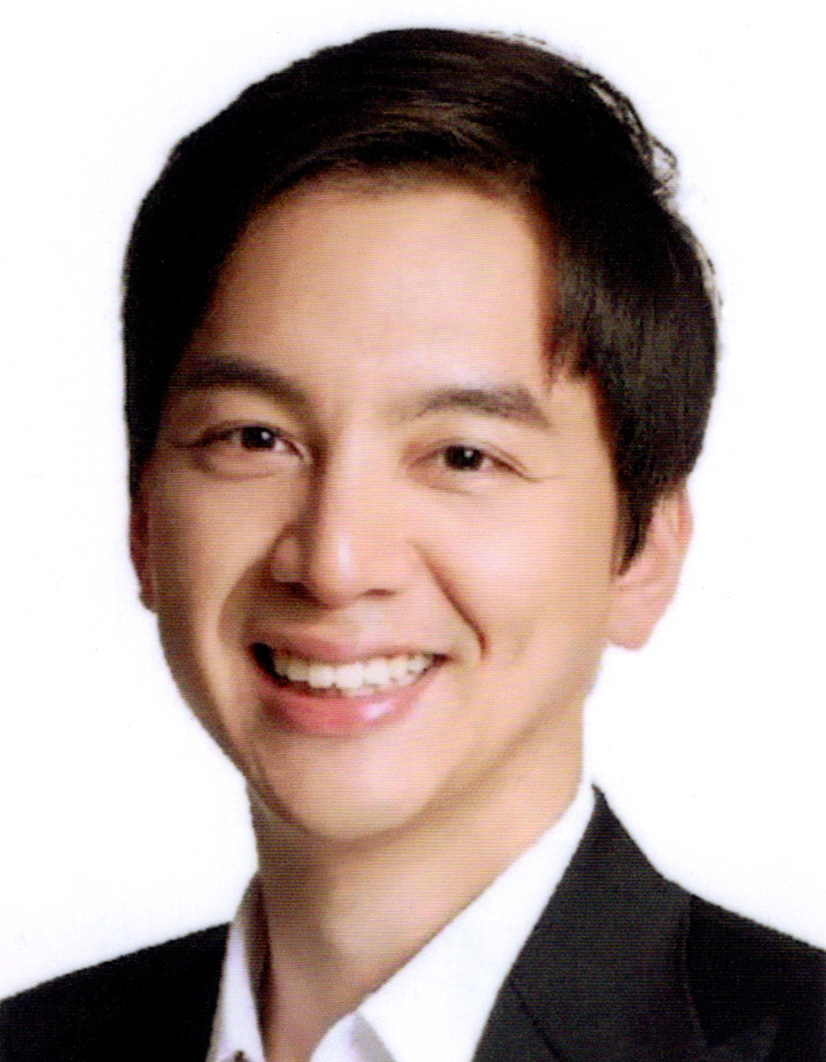
Niu Hsu-ting

Niu Hsu-ting was accused of legislative brawling and slandering DPP supporters. Niu's recall bid was unsuccessful after only 44% cast favorable votes which did not surpass the threshold of 88,517.

Recall of Niu Hsu-ting
Choice	Votes	%
Support recall	86,734	44.85
Against recall	106,637	55.15
Total	193,371	100.00
Valid votes	193,371	99.49
Invalid/blank votes	988	0.51
Total votes	194,359	100.00
Registered voters/turnout	354,065	54.89
	Not recalled	

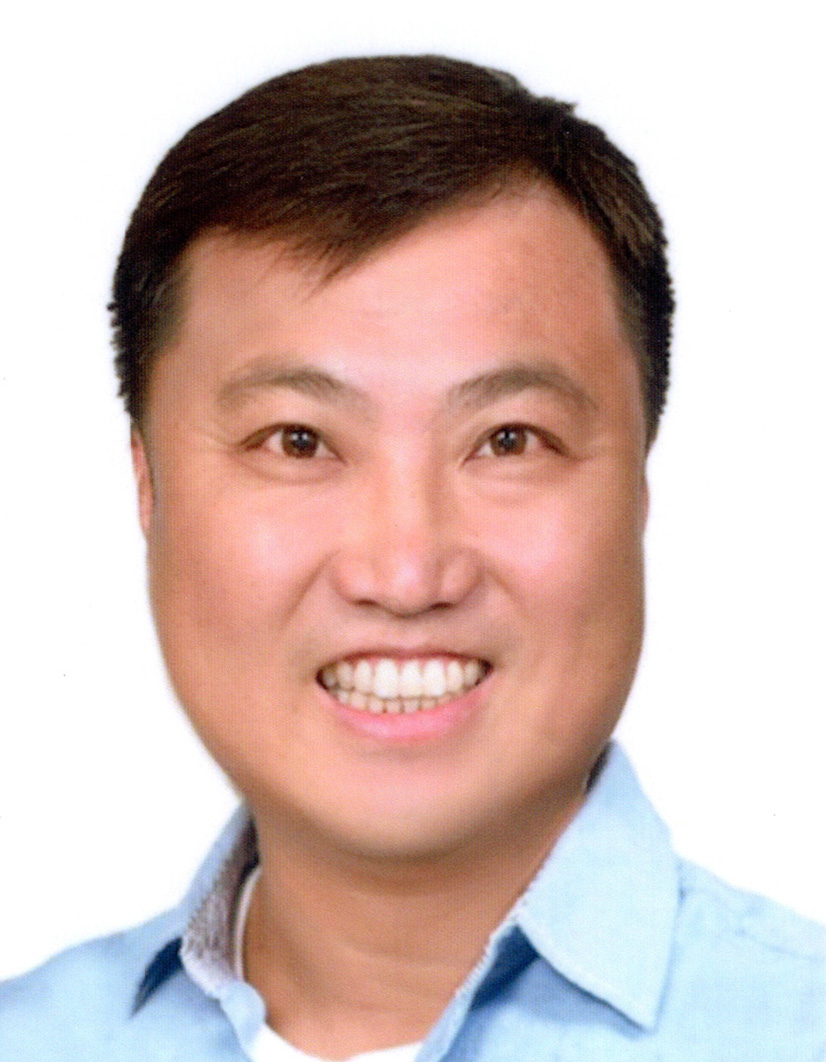
Tu Chuan-chi

Critics of Tu Chuan-chi said he objected to agricultural funds that would boost the local economy, in a direct contradiction to his manifesto. Tu was also labelled as destroying the local cultural heritage after voting against Hakka funds. The bid was defeated after only 40% came out in support of it, without reaching the threshold of 79,106.

Recall of Tu Chuan-Chi
Choice	Votes	%
Support recall	70,310	40.94
Against recall	101,419	59.06
Total	171,729	100.00
Valid votes	171,729	99.46
Invalid/blank votes	936	0.54
Total votes	172,665	100.00
Registered voters/turnout	316,423	54.57
	Not recalled	

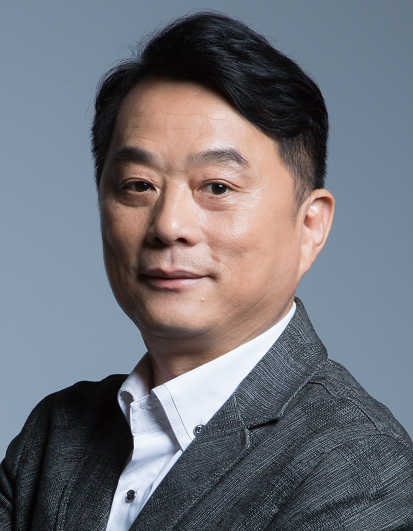
Lu Ming-che

Lu Ming-che's criticism that the cultural ministry should not solely support the reading culture of teens was listed as one of the motives for his recall bid. He stayed on as member of the Legislative Yuan as only 39% of constituents that voted wanted him to go, also falling behind the threshold of 77,251.

Recall of Lu Ming-che
Choice	Votes	%
Support recall	66,301	38.63
Against recall	105,323	61.37
Total	171,624	100.00
Valid votes	171,624	99.55
Invalid/blank votes	771	0.45
Total votes	172,395	100.00
Registered voters/turnout	309,001	55.79
	Not recalled	

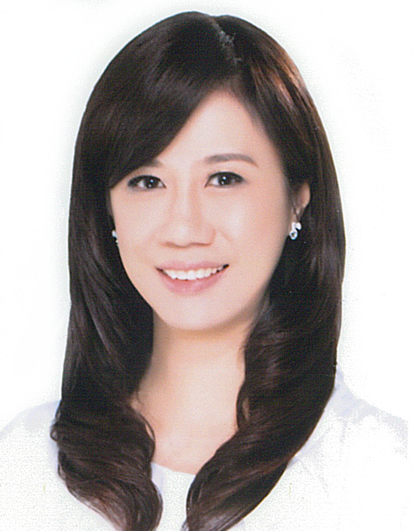
Wan Mei-ling

Wan Mei-ling was slammed for a multitude of breaches in her manifesto, including cutting the budget concerning Taoyuan's transportation. Wan's support in reforming broadcasting law that was seen as favorable to the pro-China CTi News was also mentioned in the recall bid. Wan failed to be recalled with 57% of votes against. The threshold of recall was 76,672.

Recall of Wan Mei-ling
Choice	Votes	%
Support recall	72,626	42.68
Against recall	97,544	57.32
Total	170,170	100.00
Valid votes	170,170	99.52
Invalid/blank votes	825	0.48
Total votes	170,995	100.00
Registered voters/turnout	306,688	55.76
	Not recalled	

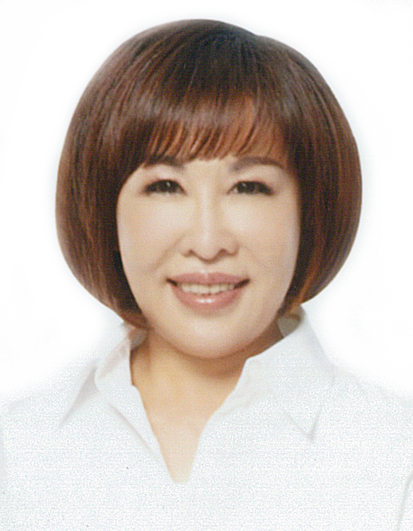
Lu Yu-lin

Civic groups said Lu Yu-lin obstructed the development of her constituency at Pingzhen and Longtan, even though her husband was a former mayor of Pingzhen and her son was a local councillor. Lu's recall move was defeated in a landslide after less than 38% supported the bid, much behind the threshold of 70,678.

Recall of Lu Yu-lin
Choice	Votes	%
Support recall	59,828	37.91
Against recall	97,970	62.09
Total	157,798	100.00
Valid votes	157,798	99.48
Invalid/blank votes	829	0.52
Total votes	158,627	100.00
Registered voters/turnout	282,711	56.11
	Not recalled	

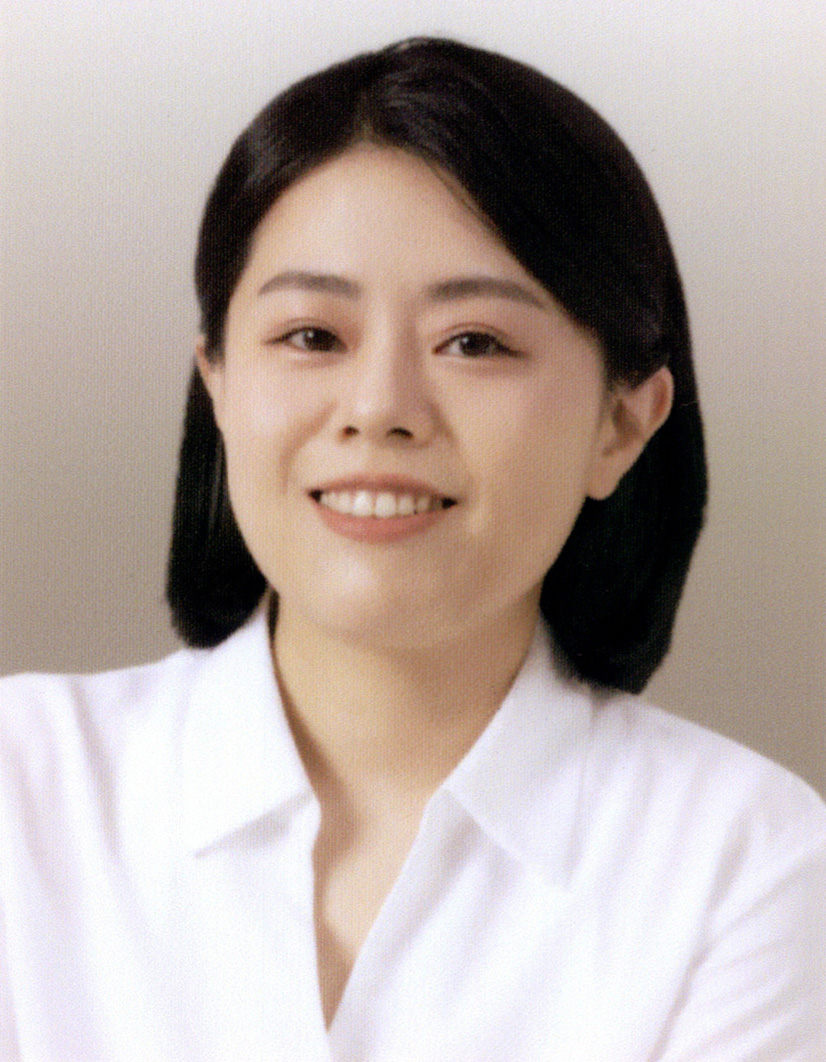
Chiu Jo-hua

Chiu Jo-hua's recall attempt secured only 40% of votes, falling behind the threshold of 71,261.

Recall of Chiu Jo-hua
Choice	Votes	%
Support recall	61,635	40.11
Against recall	92,049	59.89
Total	153,684	100.00
Valid votes	153,684	99.40
Invalid/blank votes	923	0.60
Total votes	154,607	100.00
Registered voters/turnout	285,041	54.24
	Not recalled	

==== Hsinchu City ====
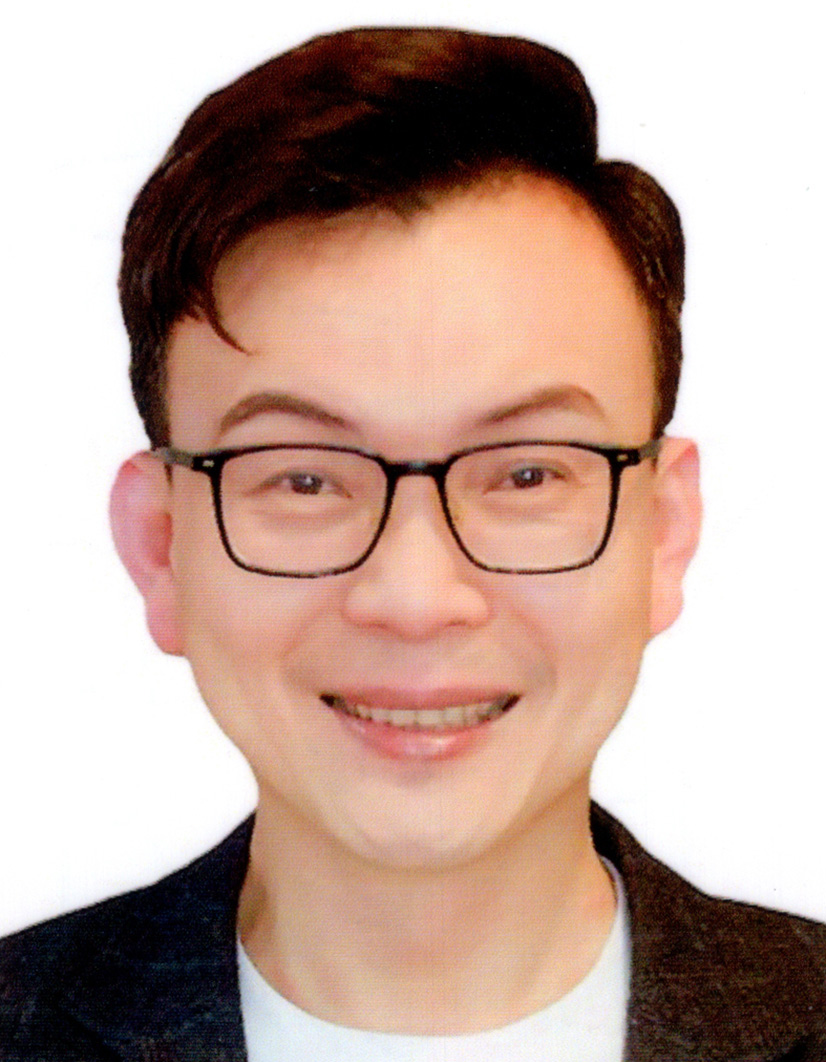
Cheng Cheng-chien

Cheng Cheng-chien was criticised for his relationship with a fraudster, after Cheng was granted a loan from a businesswoman in Taichung in 2017, whom was in turn found guilty for defrauding at least 3,000 individuals. Cheng remained as lawmaker, as more people voted against the recall than in favor, despite the supporting votes passed the threshold of 89,266.

Recall of Cheng Cheng-chien
Choice	Votes	%
Support recall	89,970	42.99
Against recall	119,305	57.01
Total	209,275	100.00
Valid votes	209,275	99.33
Invalid/blank votes	1,410	0.67
Total votes	210,685	100.00
Registered voters/turnout	357,063	59.00
	Not recalled	

==== Taichung ====
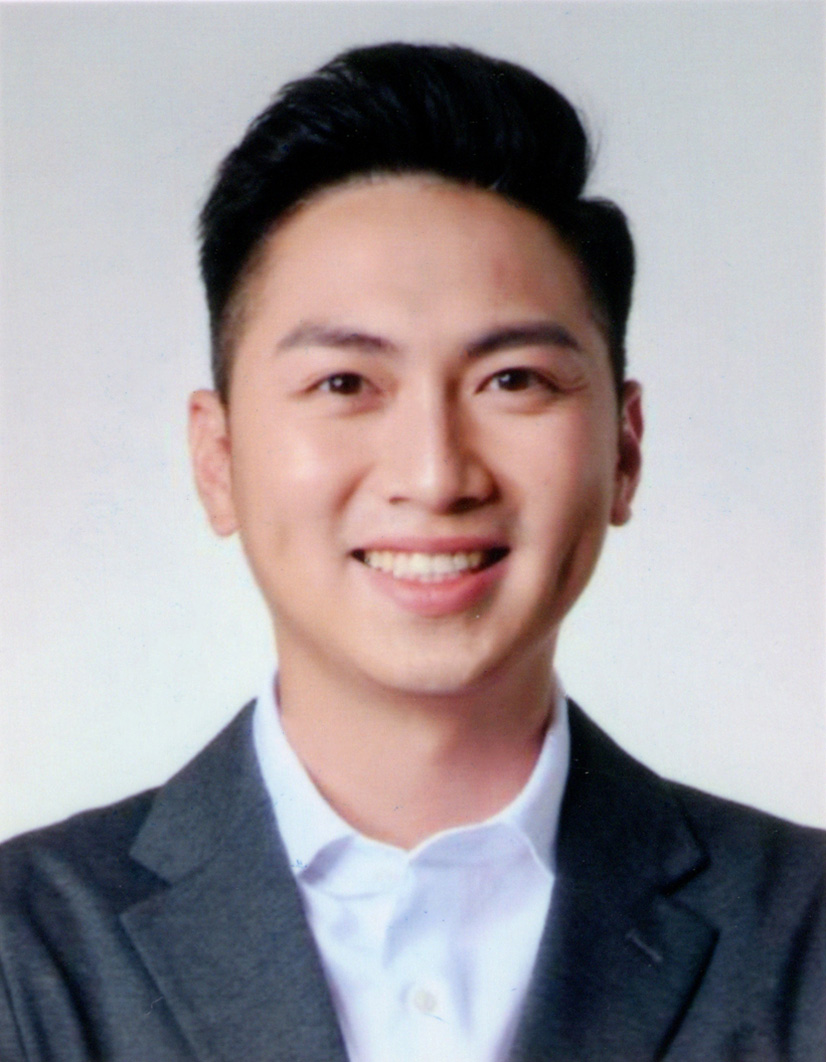
Liao Wei-hsiang

Critics of Liao Wei-hsiang said he had frequently taken credits of others' work and had failed to follow his manifesto. Liao's recall bid was defeated with 56% of votes coming out in support of him, while votes supporting the recall came behind the threshold of 84,430.

Recall of Liao Wei-hsiang
Choice	Votes	%
Support recall	83,812	44.03
Against recall	106,534	55.97
Total	190,346	100.00
Valid votes	190,346	99.48
Invalid/blank votes	991	0.52
Total votes	191,337	100.00
Registered voters/turnout	337,718	56.66
	Not recalled	

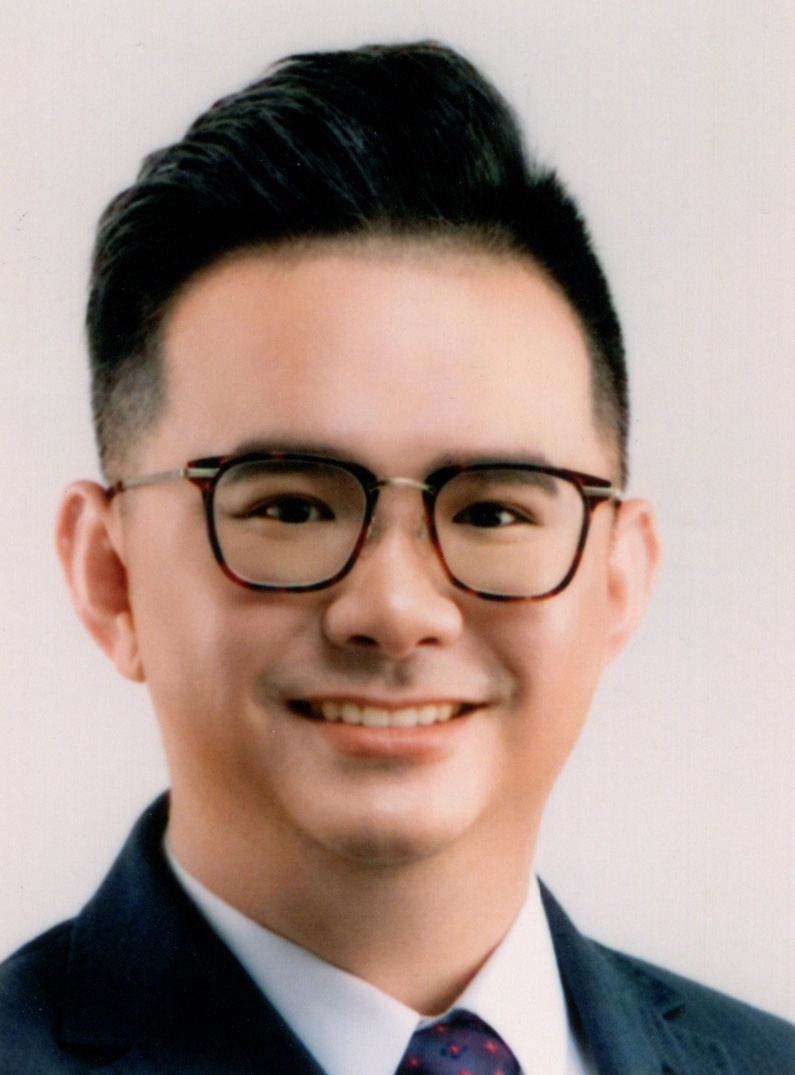
Huang Chien-hao

Huang Chien-hao's support to various proposals from his party was labelled as endangering national security and giving in to Chinese influence, including relaxing the restrictions on TikTok. Huang was not recalled, which required 93,857 in support and a majority of yes votes.

Recall of Huang Chien-hao
Choice	Votes	%
Support recall	88,914	42.65
Against recall	119,540	57.35
Total	208,454	100.00
Valid votes	208,454	99.53
Invalid/blank votes	976	0.47
Total votes	209,430	100.00
Registered voters/turnout	374,348	55.95
	Not recalled	

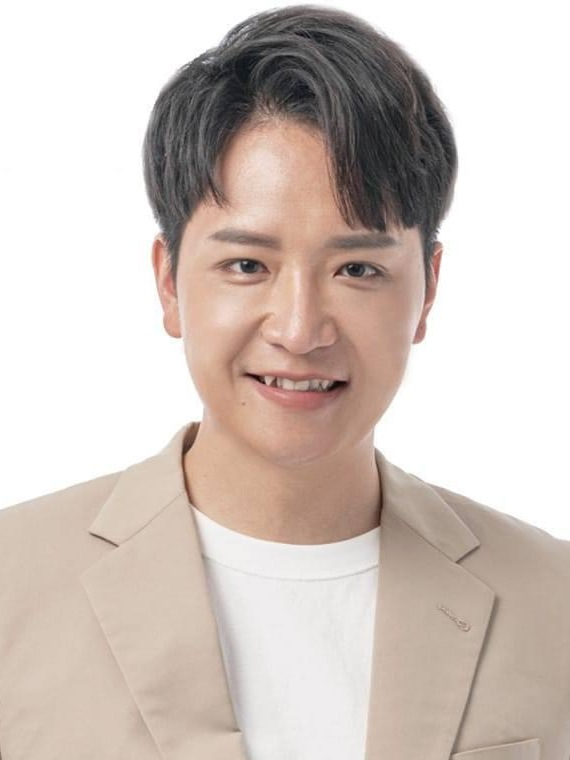
Lo Ting-wei

Lo Ting-wei was attacked for his "two-faced" wavering stances on several issues in order to win votes. His recall bid failed to secure a majority, although the threshold of 69,359 was reached.

Recall of Lo Ting-wei
Choice	Votes	%
Support recall	74,012	46.13
Against recall	86,422	53.87
Total	160,434	100.00
Valid votes	160,434	99.46
Invalid/blank votes	871	0.54
Total votes	161,305	100.00
Registered voters/turnout	277,436	58.14
	Not recalled	

==== Yunlin ====
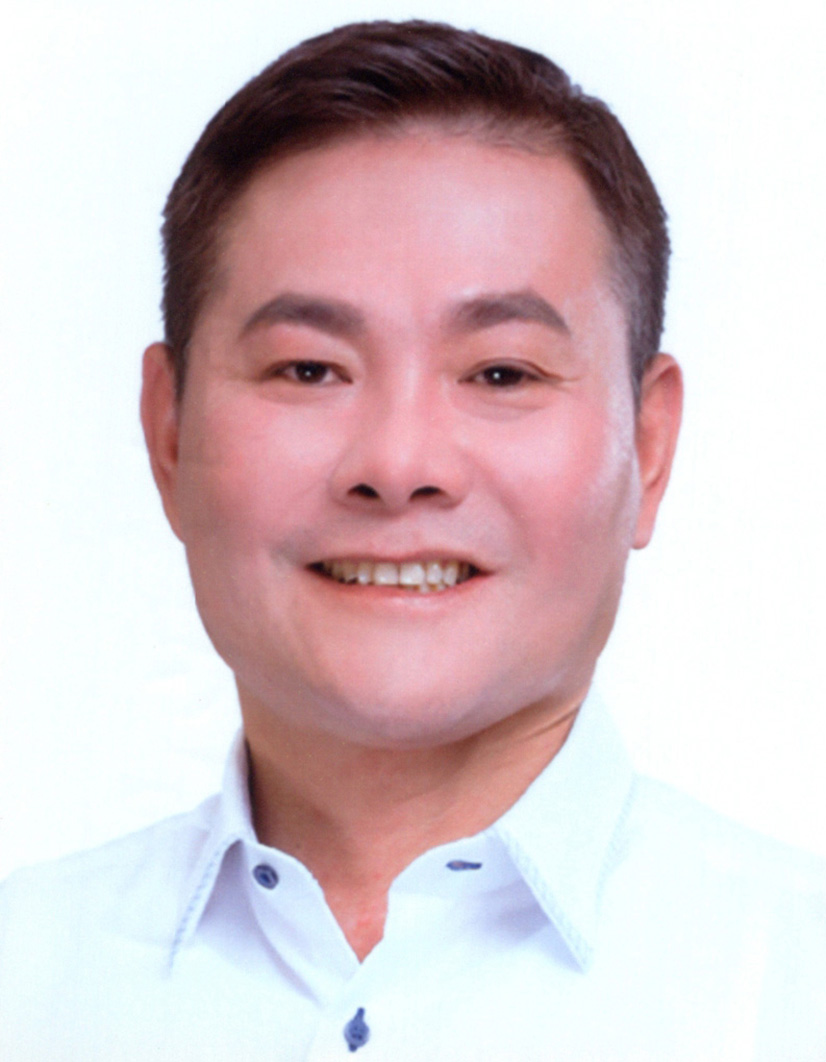
Ting Hsueh-chung

Ting Hsueh-chung's recall was defeated without reaching the threshold of 67,916.

Recall of Ting Hsueh-chung
Choice	Votes	%
Support recall	57,331	42.63
Against recall	77,164	57.37
Total	134,495	100.00
Valid votes	134,495	99.28
Invalid/blank votes	975	0.72
Total votes	135,470	100.00
Registered voters/turnout	271,663	49.87
	Not recalled	

==== Hualien ====
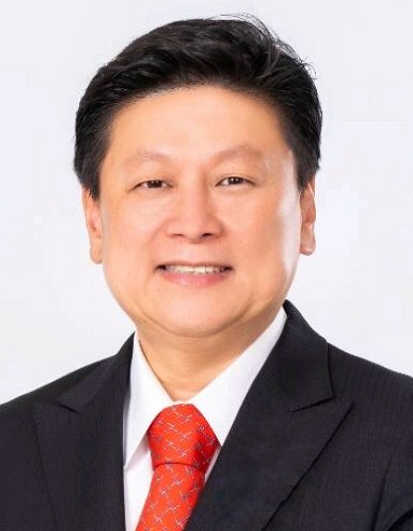
Fu Kun-chi

Fu Kun-chi, the Majority Leader of the Legislative Yuan, is the most senior Kuomintang member targeted at this round of recall waves, and his recall bid was therefore closely watched. The group that initiated his recall said he, also infamously named "King of Hualien", ignored Hualien constituents, and played an instrumental role for the passage of KMT bills that tears apart a democratic society and provokes polarization. Fu's visit to China was also questioned to be sealing a political deal and was one of the major pieces of evidence pointing to his deep involvement in the pro-Beijing network.

While there had been strong calls campaigning to unseat him, similar to that of Taipei's Wang and Hsu, and that more than the required 47,842 voted in favor of doing so, Fu was backed by more than 65,000 voters and thus defeating the recall bid.

Recall of Fu Kun-chi
Choice	Votes	%
Support recall	48,969	42.85
Against recall	65,300	57.15
Total	114,269	100.00
Valid votes	114,269	99.36
Invalid/blank votes	737	0.64
Total votes	115,006	100.00
Registered voters/turnout	191,367	60.10
	Not recalled	

==== Taitung ====
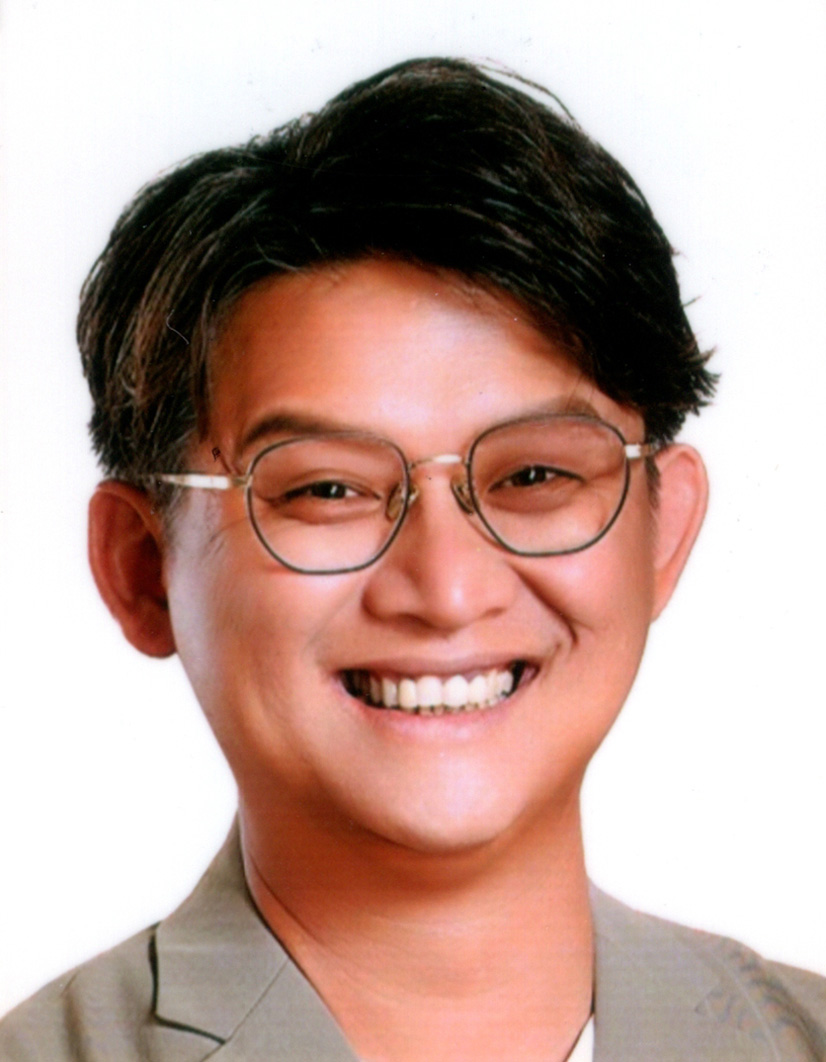
Huang Chien-pin

Huang Chien-pin's recall attempt failed with less than 38% supporting. The threshold was 28,347.

Recall of Huang Chien-pin
Choice	Votes	%
Support recall	21,123	37.71
Against recall	34,889	62.29
Total	56,012	100.00
Valid votes	56,012	99.56
Invalid/blank votes	246	0.44
Total votes	56,258	100.00
Registered voters/turnout	113,385	49.62
	Not recalled	

=== 26 July: Hsinchu mayor ===
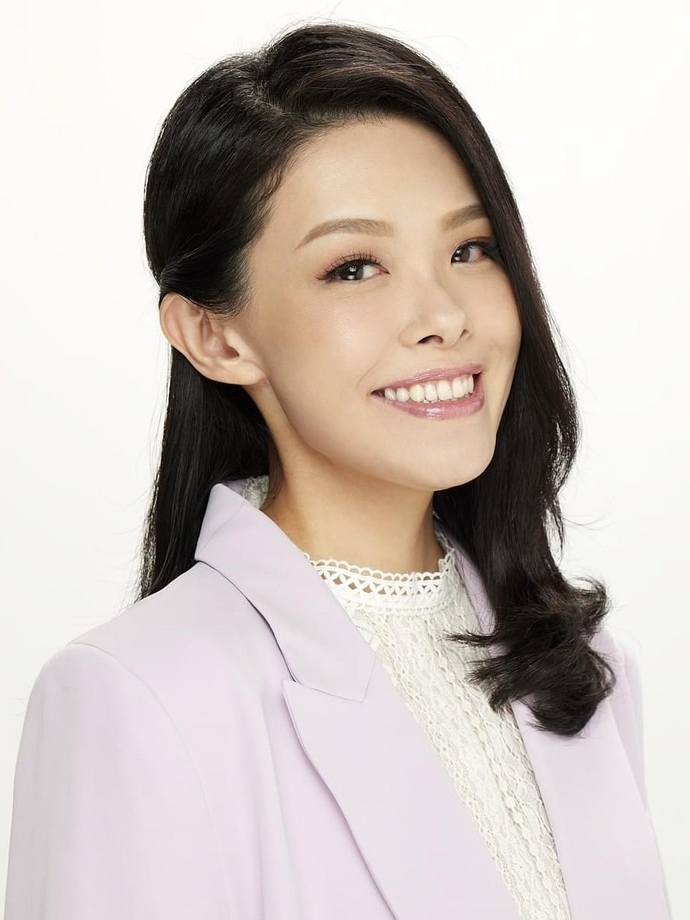
Ann Kao

Mayor of Hsinchu Ann Kao also faced removal after she was convicted of corruption and suspended from the position since July 2024. Initially the first TPP member to be elected as a local government head, she left the party after the suspension.

Kao's recall bid fell short of the majority and the threshold of 90,078. Her survival means the ruling DPP will not be able to take hold of Hsinchu.

Recall of Ann Kao
Choice	Votes	%
Support recall	86,291	40.96
Against recall	124,360	59.04
Total	210,651	100.00
Valid votes	210,651	99.35
Invalid/blank votes	1,374	0.65
Total votes	212,025	100.00
Registered voters/turnout	360,311	58.84
	Not recalled	

=== 23 August: Legislators ===
During the second round of recall votes, the seven legislators targeted, all KMT members, survived due to votes against the recall exceeding those in favor in every case.

==== Nantou ====
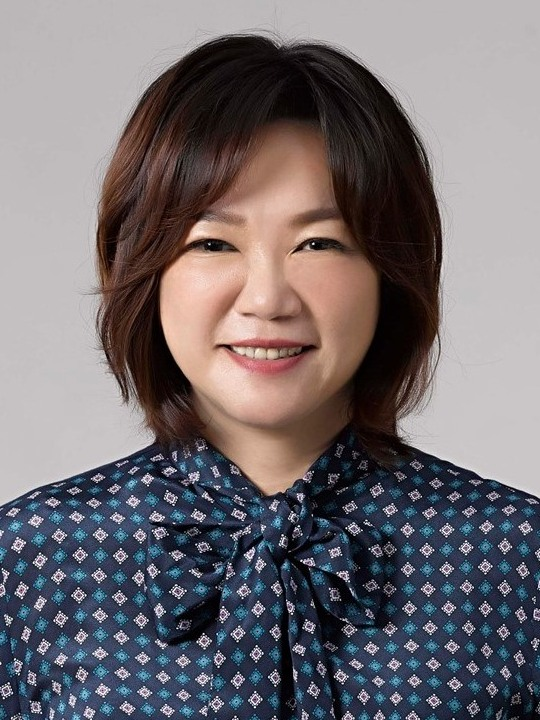
Ma Wen-chun

Ma Wen-chun has been alleged to have leaked confidential information regarding a submarine under construction to the South Korean embassy, which led to the prosecution of a South Korean technician who was assisting Taipei in the construction. The recall failed without reaching the threshold of 46,039.

Recall of Ma Wen-Chun
Choice	Votes	%
Support recall	29,914	33.33
Against recall	59,828	66.67
Total	89,742	100.00
Valid votes	89,742	98.96
Invalid/blank votes	944	1.04
Total votes	90,686	100.00
Registered voters/turnout	186,220	48.70
	Not recalled	

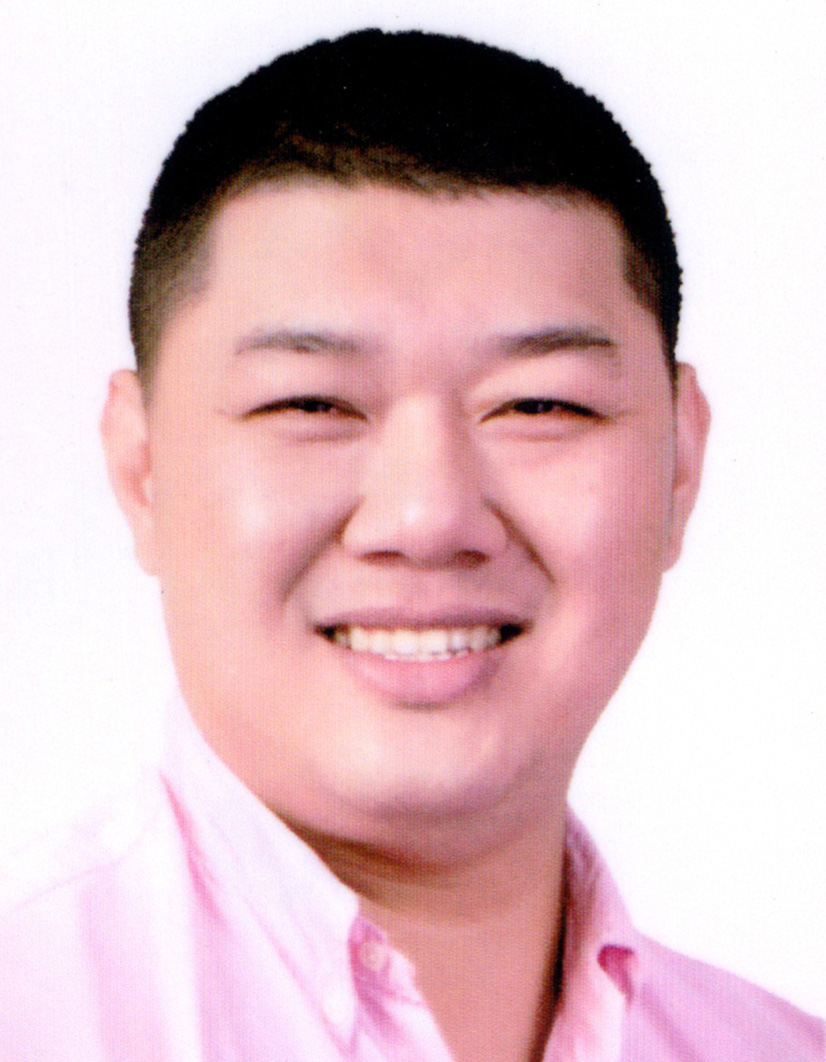
Yu Hao

Yu Hao survived the recall without reaching the recall threshold.

Recall of Yu Hao
Choice	Votes	%
Support recall	33,853	35.52
Against recall	61,443	64.48
Total	95,296	100.00
Valid votes	95,296	98.82
Invalid/blank votes	1,140	1.18
Total votes	96,436	100.00
Registered voters/turnout	195,068	49.44
	Not recalled	

==== New Taipei ====
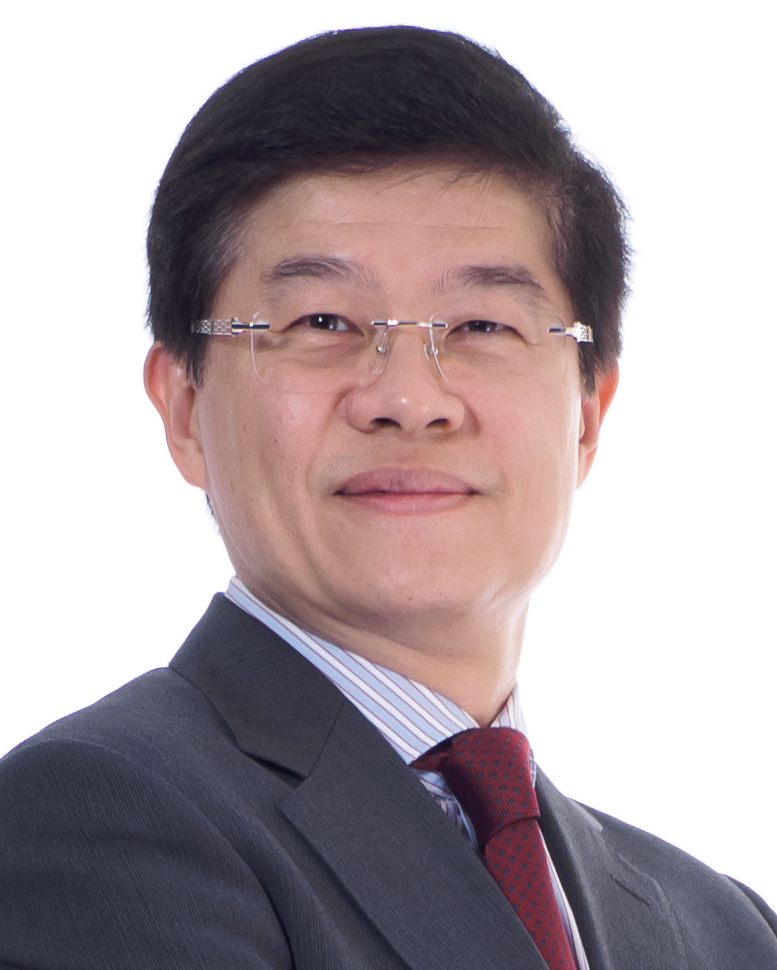
Lo Ming-tsai

Lo Ming-tsai also survived the vote. The threshold to topple Lo was 74,913.

Recall of Lo Ming-tsai
Choice	Votes	%
Support recall	49,990	34.08
Against recall	96,691	65.92
Total	146,681	100.00
Valid votes	146,681	99.14
Invalid/blank votes	1,278	0.86
Total votes	147,959	100.00
Registered voters/turnout	299,652	49.38
	Not recalled	

==== Hsinchu County ====
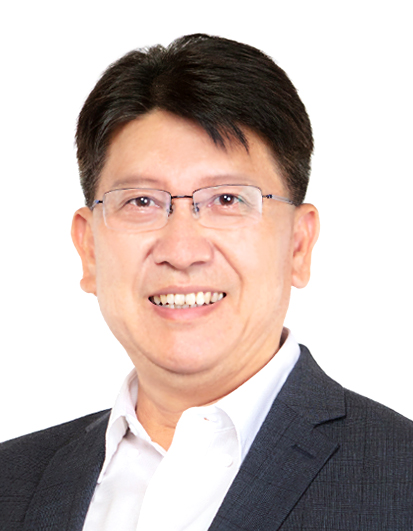
Lin Szu-ming

Lin Szu-ming was the secretary of the KMT caucus, and was blamed for endorsing multiple party's policies that harmed Taiwan's security. He was also accused of close relationship with private developer tarnished by corruption and employing aides with criminal record. The recall was resoundingly defeated with 70% of no. The threshold was 59,625.

Recall of Lin Szu-ming
Choice	Votes	%
Support recall	33,813	30.72
Against recall	76,239	69.28
Total	110,052	100.00
Valid votes	110,052	98.85
Invalid/blank votes	1,283	1.15
Total votes	111,335	100.00
Registered voters/turnout	238,499	46.68
	Not recalled	

==== Taichung ====
Yen Kuan-heng

Yen Kuan-heng was petitioned to be recalled following his assault on colleagues and his past criminal records. The recall was defeated without reaching the threshold of 76,936.

Recall of Yen Kuan-heng
Choice	Votes	%
Support recall	54,396	35.51
Against recall	98,809	64.49
Total	153,205	100.00
Valid votes	153,205	98.90
Invalid/blank votes	1,707	1.10
Total votes	154,912	100.00
Registered voters/turnout	307,742	50.34
	Not recalled	

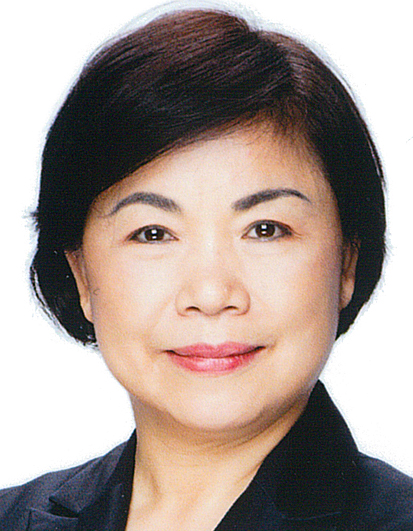
Yang Chiung-ying

Yang Chiung-ying's recall was defeated with 65.66% of votes, without reaching the threshold of 65,150.

Recall of Yang Chiung-ying
Choice	Votes	%
Support recall	43,677	34.34
Against recall	83,511	65.66
Total	127,188	100.00
Valid votes	127,188	98.93
Invalid/blank votes	1,375	1.07
Total votes	128,563	100.00
Registered voters/turnout	260,599	49.33
	Not recalled	

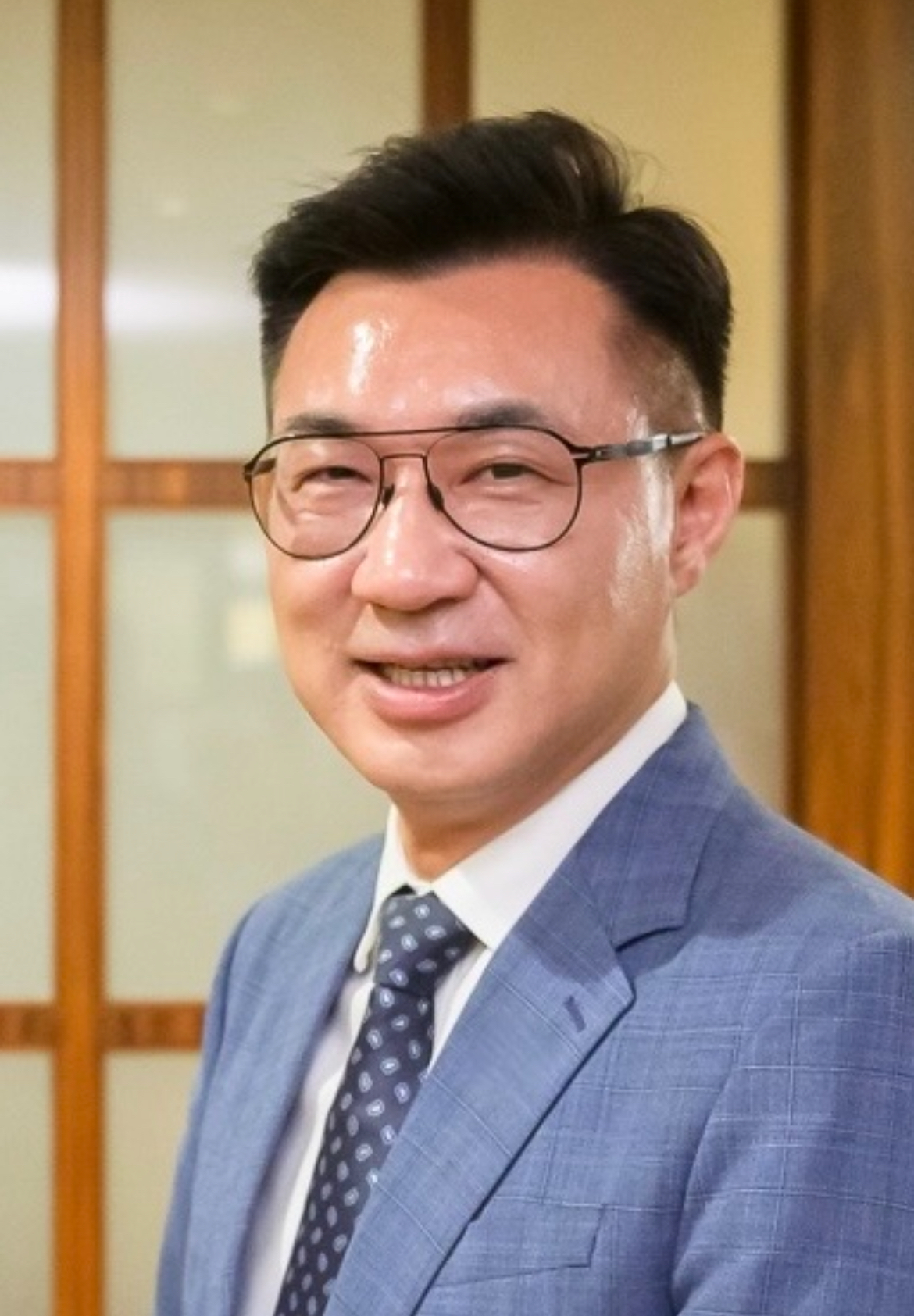
Johnny Chiang

Johnny Chiang is the former chairman of Kuomintang and incumbent Vice President of the Legislative Yuan, making him the most senior legislator threatened to lose his seat. The petition said Chiang is unable to uphold the neutrality as the vice-speaker for favouring his party. Chiang's recall was defeated without reaching the threshold of 52,213.

Recall of Johnny Chiang
Choice	Votes	%
Support recall	33,977	32.74
Against recall	69,796	67.26
Total	103,773	100.00
Valid votes	103,773	98.90
Invalid/blank votes	1,151	1.10
Total votes	104,924	100.00
Registered voters/turnout	208,849	50.24
	Not recalled	

== Aftermath ==
President Lai Ching-te urged people to accept the results as a demonstration of democracy. Wu Szu-yao, secretary general of DPP's caucus, affirmed that the party's "anti-communist and pro-Taiwan" stance would only be strengthened after the recall bids. Eric Chu, chairman of KMT, thanked voters and called for Lai to apologize and reflect on his own governance.

China said the results of the recall ballots showed the unpopular "political manipulation" by the DPP is completely contrary to the people's will, lambasting the "separatist" DPP as a dictatorship rejected at polls.

The vote was closely watched as it could alter the balance of power. With a resounding victory delivered to the KMT bloc, the "Great Recall" is seen as a blow to Lai Ching-te's government, in addition to dangers of intensifying political polarization as a revenge by Kuomintang members. Analysts considered this as a serious political miscalculation by the DPP and its affiliated groups, after the public is growingly tired of the "anti-China" rhetoric as strategy. The vote could also bring impact not only to domestic affairs, but also to China–US relations.
