= 2023 Taiwanese legislative by-elections =

← 2020	8 January 2023; 4 March 2023	2024 →

2 of 113 seats in the Legislative Yuan
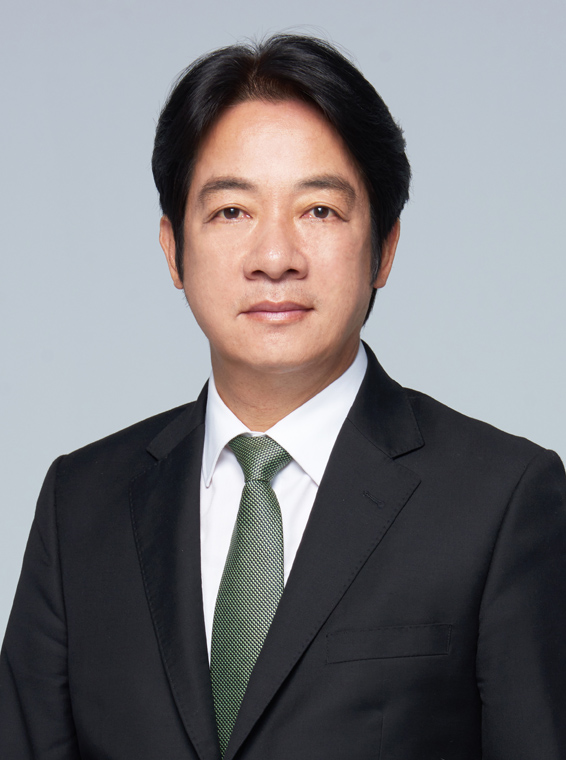

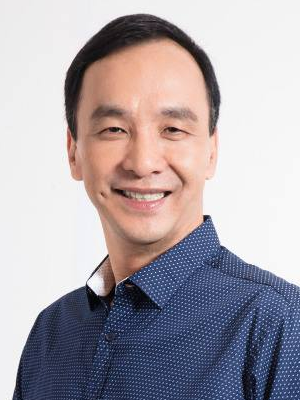
	Majority party	Minority party
Leader	Lai Ching-te	Eric Chu
Party	DPP	Kuomintang
Leader since	18 January 2023	5 October 2021
Last election	61 seats	38 seats
Seats before	61	37
Seats won	1	1
Seats after	62	38

By-elections for the Tenth Legislative Yuan were held in 2023, one each on 8 January and 4 March, in Taiwan to elect 2 of the 113 members of the Legislative Yuan for the remaining term until 2024. The Democratic Progressive Party flipped a seat from the Kuomintang in Nantou II, and the KMT retained its seat in Taipei III. After the DPP's victory in Nantou II, Frida Tsai would become the first DPP legislator to serve a district in Nantou County since the 2005 constitutional amendment halving the number of legislative seats from 225 to 113.

== Background ==
Under the Article 73 of the Civil Servants Election And Recall Act, if any positions become vacant due to resignation or election to another office, and the vacated term is longer than one year, a by-election shall be completed within three months commencing from the date of resignation.

A by-election was scheduled in Taipei for 8 January 2023, as Legislative Yuan member Chiang Wan-an had resigned his seat before taking office as Mayor of Taipei. Nantou County legislator Hsu Shu-hua vacated her seat upon taking office as Nantou County magistrate on 25 December 2022, and a by-election for her seat was planned for 4 March 2023.

== Candidates by main parties ==
=== Taipei 3 ===
- Kuomintang called in Taipei City Councillor Wang Hung-wei to contest the seat. Wang previously expressed no interest in running, citing her recent re-election as councillor, but changed course after being approached by party heavyweights.
- Democratic Progressive Party called in Enoch Wu, the founder of Forward Alliance, to contest the seat. He previously ran in the district against Chiang Wan-an in 2020, losing by only 6 percentage points in a traditionally KMT district.

=== Nantou 2 ===
- Kuomintang called in former magistrate Lin Ming-chen to contest the seat. Nantou County Councillors Yu Hao and Sung Huai-lin, as well as Lin's son, Lin Ju-pin, all expressed interest in running for the legislative seat, but the party nominated Lin Ming-chen after internal polls showed that he performed best against the DPP's Frida Tsai.
- Democratic Progressive Party called in former legislator Frida Tsai to contest the seat. Tsai previously ran in the 2022 Nantou magisterial election, as well as the 2020 legislative election for Nantou I, but lost both races.

== Results ==
=== Taipei 3 ===
Voted on 8 January 2023.

Candidate	Party	Votes	%
Wang Hung-wei	Kuomintang	60,519	52.26
Enoch Wu	Democratic Progressive Party	54,739	47.27
Hsiao He-lin	Independent	542	0.47
Total		115,800	100.00
Valid votes		115,800	99.69
Invalid/blank votes		355	0.31
Total votes		116,155	100.00
Registered voters/turnout		267,965	43.35

=== Nantou 2 ===
Voted on 4 March 2023.

Candidate	Party	Votes	%
Frida Tsai	Democratic Progressive Party	45,218	49.44
Lin Ming-chen	Kuomintang	43,293	47.34
Chen Tsung-chien	Independent	2,528	2.76
Lu Yu-chun	National Justice Movement Party	421	0.46
Total		91,460	100.00
Valid votes		91,460	99.45
Invalid/blank votes		504	0.55
Total votes		91,964	100.00
Registered voters/turnout		198,412	46.35
