= Tang Huo-shen =

Taiwanese politician

Tang Huo-shen MLY
- 湯火聖

Member of the Legislative Yuan
- In office 1 February 2002 – 31 January 2008
- Constituency: Nantou County

Member of the National Assembly
- In office 1996–2000

Personal details
- Born: 29 October 1956 (age 69) Yuchi, Nantou, Taiwan
- Party: Democratic Progressive Party
- Education: Fu Jen Catholic University; Regis University
- Occupation: politician

Tang Huo-shen (Chinese: 湯火聖; born 29 October 1956) is a Taiwanese politician. He was a member of the National Assembly from 1996 to 2000, and represented Nantou County in the Legislative Yuan between 2002 and 2008.

== Education ==
Tang studied sociology at Fu Jen Catholic University and earned an MBA from Regis University in the United States.

== Political career ==
=== Electoral history ===
Tang was elected to the National Assembly in 1996. He won a seat on the Legislative Yuan in 2001 and 2004, losing his bid for a third term in office in 2008. He faced Lee Wen-chung in a Democratic Progressive Party primary for the Nantou County Magistracy in 2013, and lost. Tang contested a 2015 legislative by-election in Nantou, but lost to Kuomintang candidate Hsu Shu-hua. Later, Tang became the assistant director of the Executive Yuan's Central Taiwan Joint Services Center.

=== Political stances ===
Tang opposed exorbitant penalties against individuals who illegally raise endangered animals, believing that if the private efforts prove more successful than government-supported attempts, the government should respond in a pragmatic manner to promote better methods of conservation. He has criticized the Executive Yuan for funding civic groups that enable former government officials to collect an income in addition to their pensions. During his legislative tenure, Tang has repeatedly drawn attention to the increasing personnel costs of the Republic of China Armed Forces, maintaining that he favors military spending to be focused on weaponry and research instead. As a legislator, Tang participated in many discussions about the state of Taiwan's military. He has frequently proposed that the government purchase military equipment from other nations. Tang has also pushed the government to review immigration policy and foreign spouses who use Taiwanese partners to obtain Republic of China citizenship for themselves and family outside of Taiwan.
