= Frida Tsai =

Taiwanese activist, biotechnologist, and politician

Frida Tsai MLY
- 蔡培慧
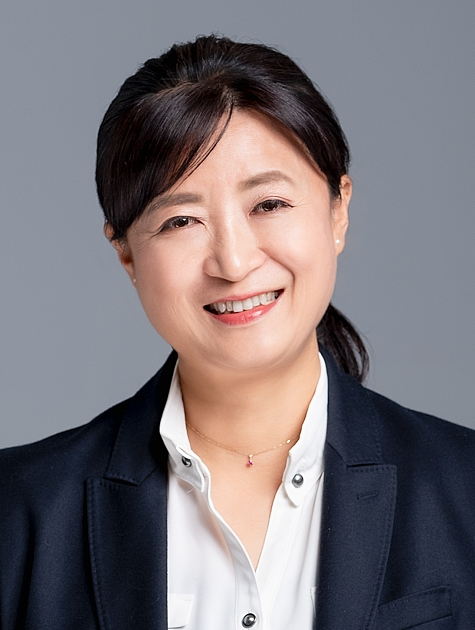
- Official portrait, 2023

Member of the Legislative Yuan
- In office 13 March 2023 – 31 January 2024
- Preceded by: Hsu Shu-hua
- Succeeded by: Yu Hao
- Constituency: Nantou II
- In office 1 February 2016 – 31 January 2020
- Constituency: Party-list (Democratic Progressive Party)

Personal details
- Born: 2 September 1971 (age 55) Yuchi, Nantou, Taiwan
- Party: Democratic Progressive Party
- Education: Chihlee University of Technology (BS); Shih Hsin University (MS); National Taiwan University (PhD)
- Scientific career
- Fields: Biotechnology
- Thesis: Differentiation of Farmers Under Agricultural Structural Transformation, 1980-2005 (2009)

Tsai Pei-hui (Chinese: 蔡培慧; pinyin: Cài Péihuì; born 2 September 1971), also known by her English name Frida Tsai, is a Taiwanese biotechnologist, politician, and activist. She served in the Legislative Yuan from 2016 to 2020, contested the Nantou County magistracy later that year, and in 2023, was reelected to the Legislative Yuan. She lost election the following year to Yu Hao.

== Early life and education ==
Tsai was born on 2 September 1971 and was raised by her grandparents in Yuchi, Nantou. As a teenager, she moved to Taipei to live with her parents and was educated at Taipei Municipal Shilin Commercial Vocational School. After graduating from Chihlee University of Technology, she earned a master's degree in psychology at Shih Hsin University and, in 2009, earned her Ph.D. in biotechnology from National Taiwan University. Her doctoral dissertation was titled, "Differentiation of Farmers Under Agricultural Structural Transformation, 1980-2005" (Chinese: 農業結構轉型下的農民分化). After receiving her doctorate, she became a professor at Shih Hsin University.

== Activism ==
Tsai is an active member of the Taiwan Rural Front, serving as the group's spokesperson. In this position, she was critical of the agricultural policies supported by the Ma Ying-jeou administration, describing the Land Expropriation Act in particular as "a tool for land developers and speculators." Tsai has led multiple protests as part of her advocacy for farmers' rights. In 2013, she mobilized a few hundred people to occupy the Executive Yuan, after the Miaoli County Government announced that it would repurpose land belonging to four families in Zhunan Township. After the Sunflower Student Movement of April 2014, Tsai cofounded the Taiwan Citizen Union and Taiwan March with protest organizers.

== Political career ==
In November 2015, the Democratic Progressive Party announced that Tsai had been placed on its party list for the January 2016 legislative elections. She was subsequently elected to the Legislative Yuan via proportional representation. In June, Tsai was invited to participate in a tribunal called to review cases under the purview of the International Covenant on Economic, Social and Cultural Rights. During her legislative tenure, Tsai proposed amendments to the Animal Protection Act that require permits to be issued before animals can perform in public. She has also cosponsored an amendment to the Housing Act differentiating between property and residency rights. Tsai became founding leader of the Taiwan-Italy Inter-Parliamentary Amity Association within the Legislative Yuan in December 2016. Tsai faced Ma Wen-chun in Nantou County's second district during the 2020 legislative elections. Tsai was nominated Democratic Progressive Party candidate for the Nantou County magistracy during the 2022 local election cycle. After losing the election to Hsu Shu-hua, Tsai was a candidate for the by-election to fill Hsu's legislative seat. Tsai narrowly defeated former magistrate Lin Ming-chen, becoming the first DPP legislator to serve the Nantou II constituency.

She lost the 2024 Taiwanese legislative election to Kuomintang candidate Yu Hao.

=== Political stances ===
Due to public health concerns, Tsai supports limits on the amount of genetically modified food allowed to enter the Taiwanese market, stating that imported soybeans specifically should be graded and labeled before distribution and use. Tsai also backed an increase in government funding for plant breeding research.
