= Yu Hao (politician) =

Taiwanese politician and political scientist (born 1983)

Yu Hao MLY
- 游顥
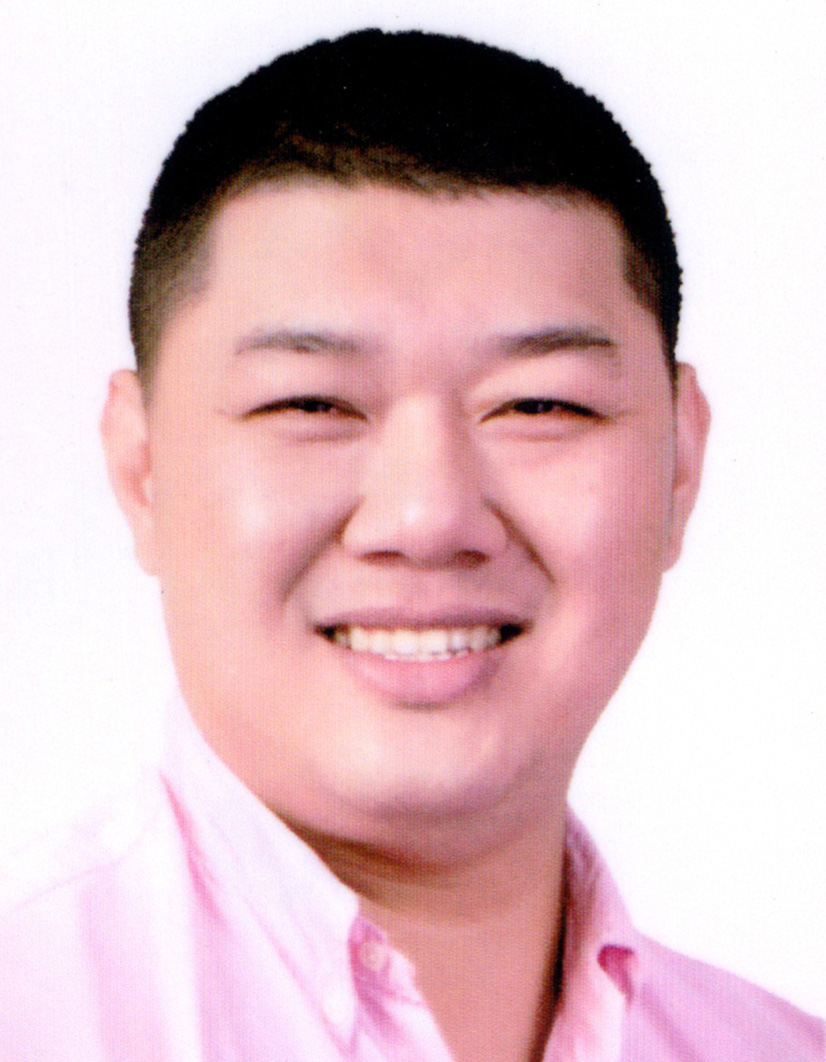
- Official portrait, 2024

Member of the Legislative Yuan
- Incumbent
- Assumed office 1 February 2024
- Preceded by: Frida Tsai
- Constituency: Nantou County II

Nantou County Councilor
- In office 25 December 2018 – 31 January 2024
- Constituency: District 4 (Lugu–Zhushan)

Personal details
- Born: 11 September 1983 (age 43) Keelung, Taiwan
- Party: Kuomintang
- Education: National Chung Cheng University (BS); National Cheng Kung University (MS); National Taiwan University (PhD)

Chinese name
- Traditional Chinese: 游顥
- Simplified Chinese: 游颢
Transcriptions
Standard Mandarin
- Hanyu Pinyin: Yóu Hào
- Bopomofo: ㄧㄡˊ ㄏㄠˋ
- Wade–Giles: You2 Hao4
Yue: Cantonese
- Jyutping: Jau4 Hou6
Southern Min
- Hokkien POJ: Iû Hō

Yu Hao (Chinese: 游顥; pinyin: Yóu Hào; born 11 September 1983) is a Taiwanese political scientist and politician. He served on the Nantou County Council from 2018 to 2024, when he was elected to the Legislative Yuan.

== Early life and education ==
Yu was born on 11 September 1983 in Keelung, Taiwan. He was raised in Nantou County, living in both Nantou City and Mingjian Township, where his father, a police officer, was frequently reassigned. His mother was a homemaker. Yu was raised in a single-parent household. His family had roots in the Sheliao (社寮) area of Zhushan Township, near Zhushan Zinan Temple, in Nantou County.

Yu attended Mingjian Elementary School (名間國小) and Pinghe Elementary School (平和國小), both in Nantou County. Afterwards, he was schooled at Nantou Junior High School (南投國中) and Zhongxing Senior High School (中興高中) in Nantouf City. He then graduated from National Chung Cheng University with a bachelor's degree in labor relations. After college, he served in the Republic of China Army as a frogman.

In 2008, Yu earned a master's degree in political economy from National Cheng Kung University. His master's thesis was titled, Research on Policy Formulation of Environmental Pollution Renovation: The Case Study of An-Shun Site, CPDC (環境污染整治政策形成之研究——以中石化（台鹼）安順廠為例). He then earned a Ph.D. in political science from National Taiwan University.

== Political career ==
=== Early political career ===
Yu represented the Kuomintang in the 2014 Taiwanese local elections, and was not elected to the Nantou County Council.

Yu opposed the removal of Hung Hsiu-chu as the Kuomintang's candidate for the 2016 presidential election. He continued to work for Hung during her tenure as Kuomintang leader.

Yu contested the 2018 local elections, winning a seat on the Nantou County Council representing the multi-member fourth district. He was the leading vote-getter in the same district during the 2022 election cycle. That same year, Yu was also elected to the Kuomintang's Central Standing Committee.

=== Legislative Yuan ===
Yu was considered a potential candidate for the 2023 Nantou by-election before the Kuomintang called in Lin Ming-chen. Yu won over 70,000 votes in the 2024 legislative election defeating incumbent Democratic Progressive Party legislator Frida Tsai and independent candidate Chen Kuei-yu in the Legislative Yuan's Nantou II constituency. His campaign was backed by Nantou magistrate Hsu Shu-hua and performed well in the townships of Lugu and Zhushan. Yu also benefited from a split vote within the Pan-Green Coalition, as Chen had left the Democratic Progressive Party to mount an independent campaign.

== Personal life ==
Yu married Huang Zi-chien on 31 January 2021. Due to the COVID-19 pandemic, their wedding ceremony was postponed to the following month.
