= Hsu Shu-hua =

Taiwanese politician

- 許淑華
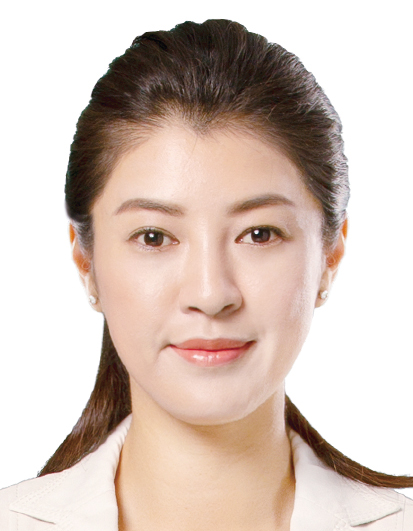
- Official portrait, 2022

12th Magistrate of Nantou
- Incumbent
- Assumed office 25 December 2022
- Deputy: Wang Jui-te
- Preceded by: Lin Ming-chen

Member of the Legislative Yuan
- In office 16 February 2015 – 25 December 2022
- Preceded by: Lin Ming-chen
- Succeeded by: Frida Tsai
- Constituency: Nantou II

6th Mayor of Nantou
- In office 1 March 2006 – 25 December 2014
- Preceded by: Lee Chao-ching; Chen Jui-ching (acting)
- Succeeded by: Sung Huai-lin

Nantou County Councillor
- In office 1 March 2002 – 28 February 2006
- Constituency: Nantou I

Personal details
- Born: 15 October 1975 (age 50) Nantou Township, Nantou County, Taiwan
- Party: Kuomintang
- Education: Nan Kai University of Technology (BS); Feng Chia University (MBA)

Hsu Shu-hua (Chinese: 許淑華; pinyin: Xǔ Shúhuá; Wade–Giles: Hsü^{3} Shu^{2}-hua^{2}; born 15 October 1975) is a Taiwanese politician serving as magistrate of Nantou County.

From 2002 to 2006, she was a member of the Nantou County Council. Hsu then served as mayor of Nantou City until 2014. She subsequently won a by-election to the Legislative Yuan. Hsu vacated her legislative seat in 2022 to take office as magistrate of Nantou County.

Another Taiwanese politician also named Hsu Shu-hua is a Taipei City Councilor, representing the Democratic Progressive Party.

== Early life and education ==
Hsu was born on 15 October 1975. She graduated from Nan Kai University of Technology with a bachelor's degree in industrial management and earned a Master of Business Administration (M.B.A.) from Feng Chia University.

== Political career ==
Hsu was elected to the Nantou County Council in 2002, and became mayor of Nantou City in 2006. While mayor of Nantou, she was elected to the Kuomintang Central Standing Committee in 2011. She served as mayor until 2014, and was named a representative to the Legislative Yuan in a by-election, taking office on 16 February 2015. With the support of Wu Den-yih, Hsu won a full legislative term in January 2016. In April, Hsu was named a deputy secretary-general of the Kuomintang. That September, she won a drawing over Tuan Yi-kang to become co-convener of the legislature's Organic Laws and Statutes Committee alongside Yu Mei-nu. In May 2022, the Kuomintang nominated Hsu as its candidate for the Nantou magistracy in the local elections. Hsu defeated Democratic Progressive Party candidate Frida Tsai and political independent Wang Yung-ching, necessitating a by-election for her legislative constituency.

== Political stances ==
Hsu supports strengthening laws against fraud and proposed an amendment to the Criminal Code in 2016 intending to bring fraud committed abroad by Taiwanese citizens under the jurisdiction of Taiwanese authorities. In December 2016, she proposed an amendment to the Civil Code in regards to same-sex marriage in Taiwan, retaining gendered terms in the code's Article 972, but at the same time introduced language to recognize partners of a same-sex union. In July 2017, Democratic Progressive Party member Chiu Yi-ying tried to break up a group of Kuomintang members who were protesting the Forward-looking Infrastructure Development Program. Hsu Shu-hua was the first to stop Chiu from interfering with the protest.

== Personal life ==
Hsu owns a collection of Smurfs memorabilia.
