= Lin Ming-chen =

Taiwanese politician

- 林明溱
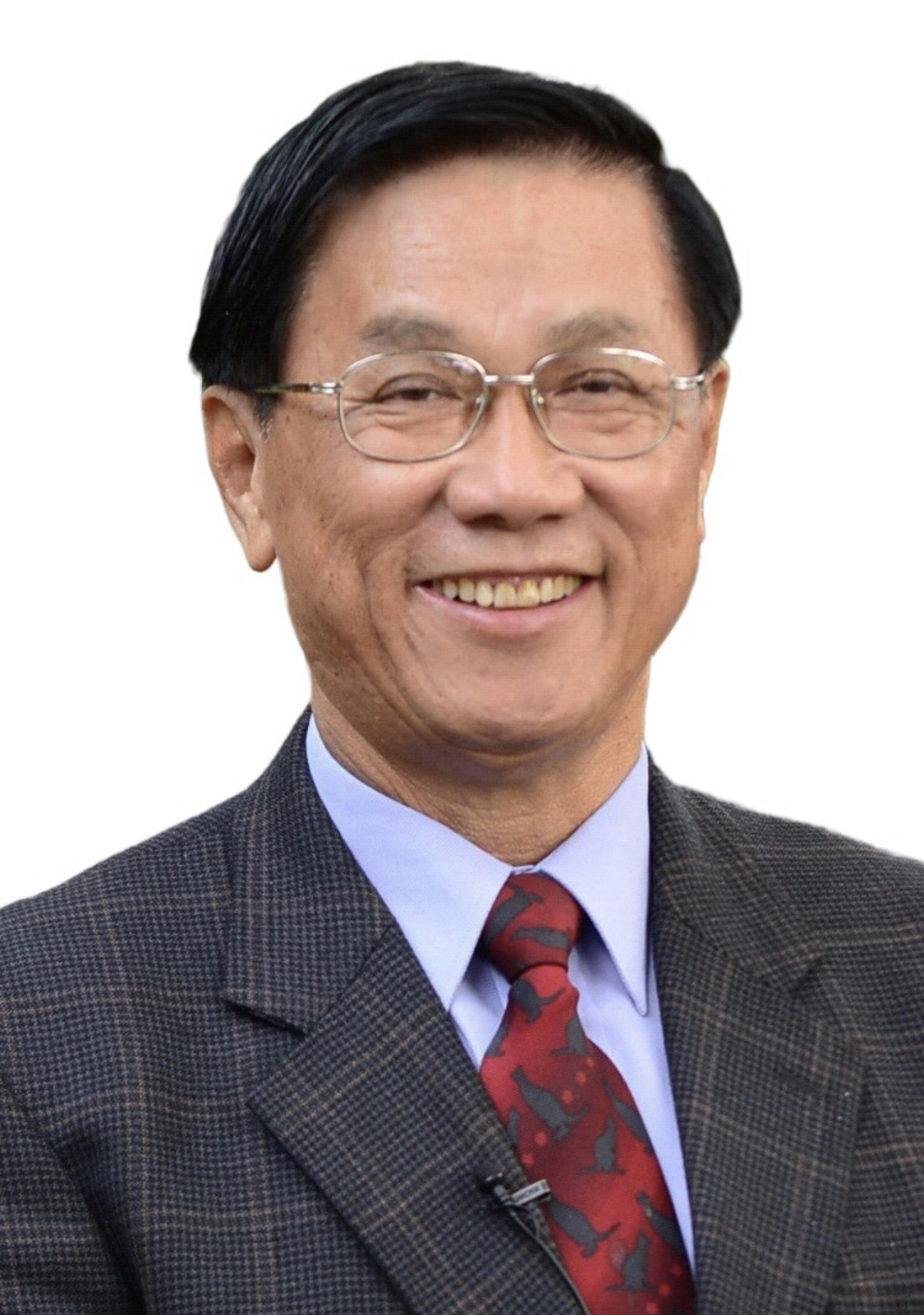

Magistrate of Nantou County
- In office 25 December 2014 – 25 December 2022
- Preceded by: Lee Chao-ching; Chen Chih-ching (acting)
- Succeeded by: Hsu Shu-hua

Member of the Legislative Yuan
- In office 1 February 2008 – 25 December 2014
- Succeeded by: Hsu Shu-hua
- Constituency: Nantou 2

Personal details
- Born: 13 February 1951 (age 75) Nantou County, Taiwan
- Party: Kuomintang
- Education: China Junior College of Technology (BArch); Chaoyang University of Technology (MS)

Lin Ming-chen (Chinese: 林明溱; pinyin: Lín Míngzhēn; Wade–Giles: Lin^{2} Ming^{2}-chên^{1}; Pe̍h-ōe-jī: Lîm Bêng-chin) is a Taiwanese politician who served as a member of the Legislative Yuan from 2005 to 2014 and as magistrate of Nantou County from 2014 to 2022. In both offices, Lin was succeeded by Hsu Shu-hua.

== Education ==
Lin earned his bachelor's degree in architecture from China Junior College of Technology and master's degree in leisure service management from Chaoyang University of Technology.

== Early political career ==
Lin led Jiji Township from 1994 to 2002, was subsequently elected to the Nantou County Council until 2006, and served on the Legislative Yuan between 2008 and 2014.

== Magistrate of Nantou County ==
=== 2014 Magistrate election ===
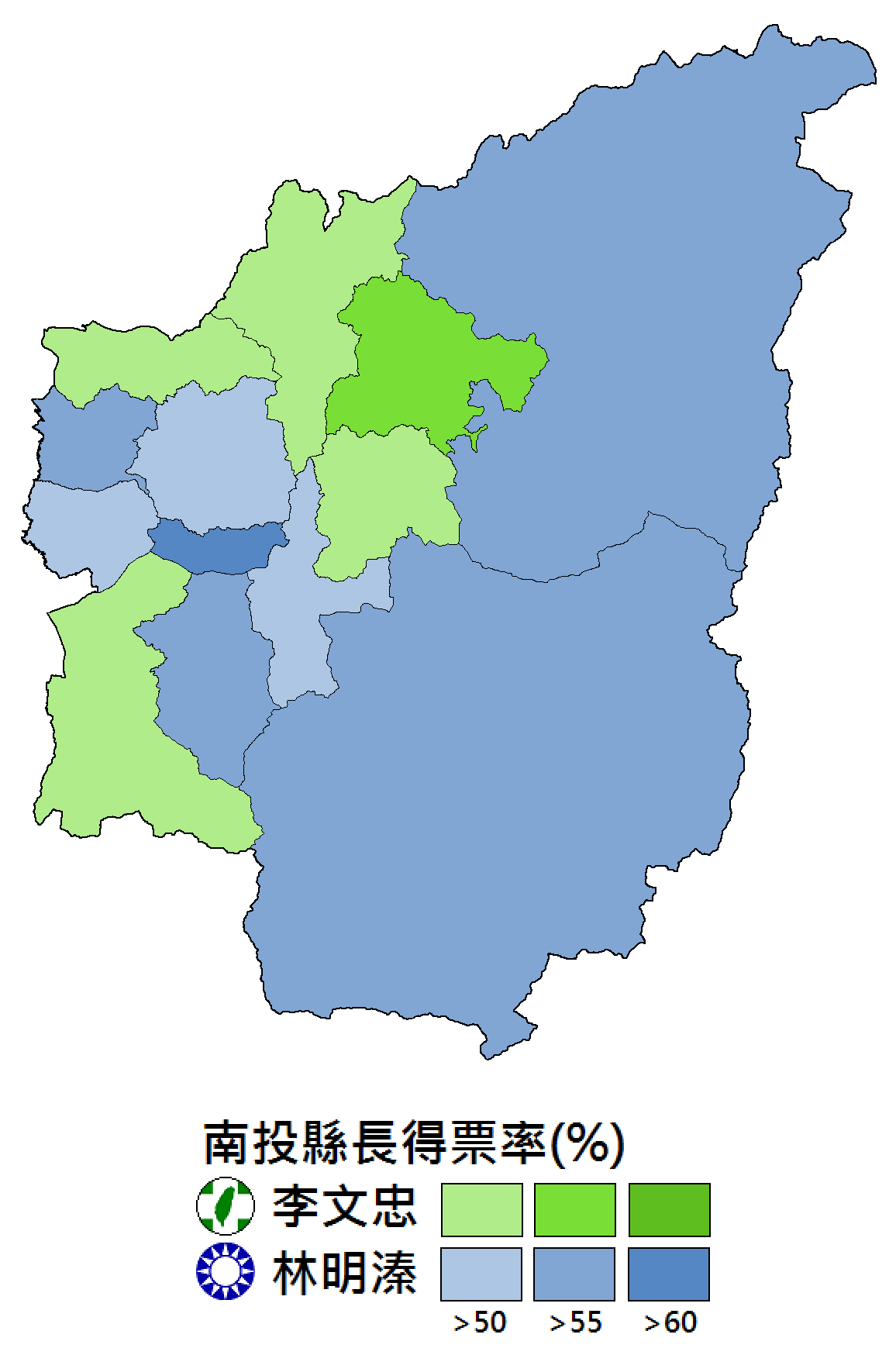
2014 magistrate election result in Nantou County between Lin and his opponent Lee Wen-chung (李文忠)

Lin was elected as the Magistrate of Nantou County after winning the 2014 Nantou County magistrate election held on 29 November 2014.

2014 Nantou County Magistrate Election Result
No.	Candidate	Party	Votes	Percentage
1	Lee Wen-chung	DPP	143,719	49.04%
2	Lin Ming-chen	KMT	149,361	50.96%

=== 2016 Mainland China visit ===
In September 2016, Lin with another seven magistrates and mayors from Taiwan visited Beijing, which were Hsu Yao-chang (Magistrate of Miaoli County), Chiu Ching-chun (Magistrate of Hsinchu County), Liu Cheng-ying (Magistrate of Lienchiang County), Yeh Hui-ching (Deputy Mayor of New Taipei City), Chen Chin-hu (Deputy Magistrate of Taitung County), Fu Kun-chi (Magistrate of Hualien County) and Wu Cherng-dean (Deputy Magistrate of Kinmen County). Their visit was aimed to reset and restart cross-strait relations after President Tsai Ing-wen took office on 20 May 2016. The eight local leaders reiterated their support of One-China policy under the 1992 consensus. They met with Taiwan Affairs Office Head Zhang Zhijun and Chairperson of the Chinese People's Political Consultative Conference Yu Zhengsheng.

=== 2018 Magistrate election ===
The Kuomintang endorsed Lin for a second term as Nantou County magistrate in December 2017.

2018 Kuomintang Nantou County magistrate primary results
Candidates	Place	Result
Lin Ming-chen	Nominated	Walkover

2018 Nantou County mayoral results
No.	Candidate	Party	Votes	Percentage
1	Lin Ming-chen	Kuomintang	195,385	66.72%
2	Hung Kuo-hao (洪國浩)	Democratic Progressive Party	97,460	33.28%
Total voters			413,222	
Valid votes			292,845	
Invalid votes				
Voter turnout			70.87%	

== Later political career ==
Lin contested the 2023 Nantou legislative by-election, seeking Hsu Shu-hua's vacant seat. During the campaign, Lin was accused of plagiarizing his master's thesis.

== Personal life ==
Lin is married and has a son.
