= Luo Shu-lei =

Taiwanese politician and accountant (born 1952)

- 羅淑蕾
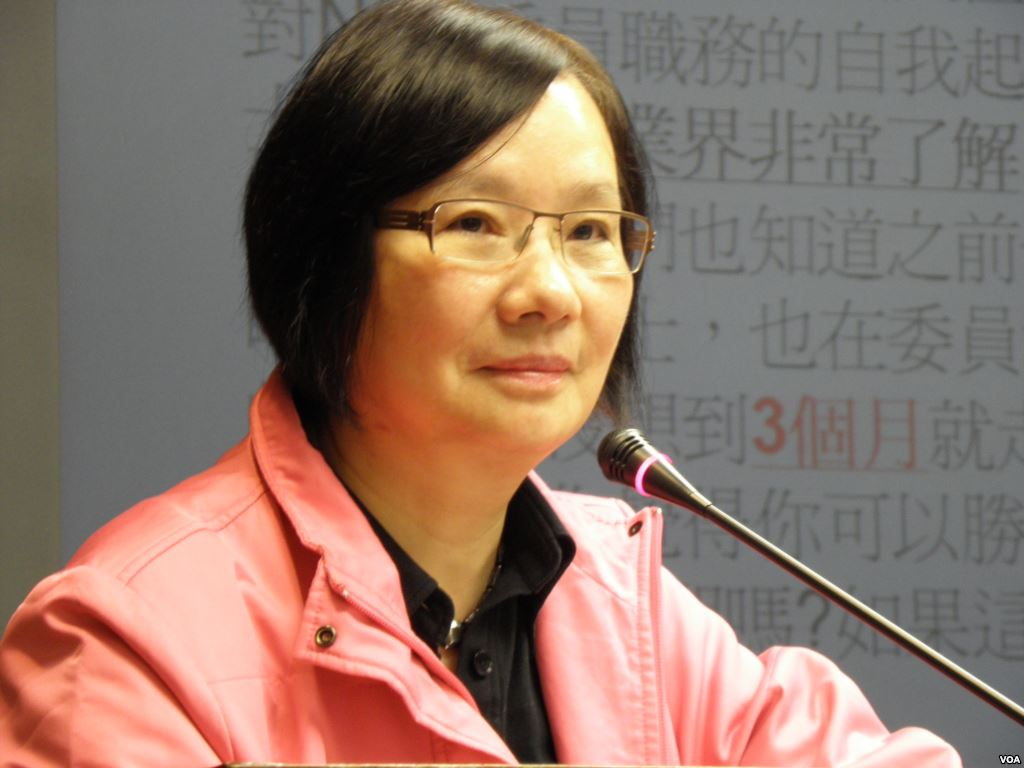

Member of the Legislative Yuan
- In office February 1, 2012 – January 31, 2016
- Preceded by: Chiang Hsiao-yen
- Succeeded by: Chiang Wan-an
- Constituency: Taipei City Constituency III(8th session)
- Majority: 118,503 (56.07%)
- In office November 26, 2007 – January 31, 2012
- Preceded by: Christina Liu

Personal details
- Born: November 28, 1952 (age 73) Datong District, Taipei, Taiwan
- Party: Kuomintang (PFP) (after 2008)
- Other political affiliations: People First Party (after 2002)
- Education: Soochow University (BA)
- Profession: Accountant

Luo Shu-lei (Chinese: 羅淑蕾; born November 28, 1952) is a Taiwanese politician, accountant, and member of both the People First Party and the Kuomintang. She served in the Legislative Yuan from 2007 to 2016. She was first seated as an alternate at-large legistor in 2007, won a full at-large term in 2008, and held the Taipei City Constituency III seat from 2012.

== Early life and work ==
Luo Shu-lei was born in Datong District, Taipei, and grew up in Dadaocheng; her family was relatively wealthy because her father was engaged in the dyeing industry in Wanhua. After graduating from Keelung Girls' High School, she was admitted to the Accounting Department of Soochow University. While studying in college, she began to intern at the famous Cheng Baojia Accounting Firm and gained recognition. Later, she worked as the financial director and deputy general manager of a foreign company that imported American beef until she obtained the qualification as an accountant and established her own firm.

In 2004, she was elected as the chairman of the Taipei Institute of Certified Public Accountants, becoming the first woman to hold this position. From 2010 to 2015, she served as the Chairman of the National Federation of Accountants Institute of the Republic of China.

== Political career ==
=== Early attempts ===
In 2002, she participated in politics for the first time. Huang Shanshan was nominated to run for Taipei City Council on behalf of the People First Party, as was Huang Shanshan, who was seeking re-election. However, because Huang Shanshan had the second highest number of votes, the result was unmatched, leaving Luo in the Nangang, Neihu District with less than 900 votes. Badly missed. In 2004, she was ranked 7th among the People's First Party's at-large legislators, but ultimately became the loser. In 2006, she participated in the Million Voices Against Corruption, President Chen Must Go campaign.

=== Legislator ===
In November 2007, Luo Shu-lei succeeded Christina Liu, who had resigned her position as first-ranked legislator in the Non-Partisan Solidarity Union party list. Luo entered the Legislative Yuan as a substitute and served as an at-large legislator for two months. In 2007, the People's Party negotiated with the Kuomintang. In the 2008 Taiwanese legislative election, the Kuomintang gave up four at-large legislative seats and co-selected with the People's Party. Luo Shu-lei lost her overseas status due to the overseas Chinese election of legislator Marr Chang-chi, who established a new office in Taiwan. She was disqualified after less than half a year of membership. Originally, the Kuomintang senior leadership tried to integrate Shen Zhihui, who was planning to run for regional legislators, but failed because he had already registered to run. In the end, she was reranked from 30th to 14th. In 2008, the Kuomintang won 20 at-large legislative seats and she was reelected as a legislator on behalf of the Kuomintang.

On the eve of the 2008 Taiwanese presidential election on March 12, 2008, four Kuomintang legislators, Luo Shu-lei, Fai Hrong-tai, Lo Ming-tsai and Chen Jie broke into the gated offices of Democratic Progressive Party candidates Frank Hsieh and Su Tseng-chang in the campaign headquarters of the Reform Hall. They were accused of trespassing and abusing their power. This incident once caused tension in the election of Kuomintang candidate Ma Ying-jeou. The next day, KMT Chairman Wu Po-hsiung and the four legislators apologized to calm the storm.

In 2011, in the KMT primary polls in the Taipei City Constituency III, she defeated incumbent legislator and KMT Vice Chairman Chiang Hsiao-yen with a margin of less than 0.6%. Although the KMT Taipei City Party Headquarters statement was not the final result, Chiang decided to withdraw from the primary election, not seek placement on the KMT party list, and backed Luo Shu-lei in the election, serving as chair of Luo's campaign team. In 2012, she defeated the then-city councilor Jian Yuyan recruited by the Democratic Progressive Party by a margin of nearly 30,000 votes. When she ran for the regional legislator for the first time, she won nearly 120,000 votes and became the regional legislator-elect with the highest number of votes in Taipei City. Continuous victory. The record for the highest number of votes in Taipei City was not broken until 2020 by Kao Chia-yu, but her 118,503 votes in this constituency is still the highest record so far.

In April 2013, Hung Hsiu-chu, then Vice Chairman of the Kuomintang and Vice President of the Legislative Yuan, named party legislator Luo Shu-lei in the Kuomintang Zhongshan Conference newspaper for making a speech that "hurts the party".

On September 10, 2014, Luo Shu-lei accused Taipei mayor candidate Ko Wen-je of money laundering and instigating and assisting others to evade taxes. This accusation triggered the MG149 case.

In 2015, the Kuomintang had two stages of internal recruitment. If the incumbent could achieve a lead of more than 5% in the first stage, he could be recruited. Luo Shu-lei was elected in Taipei City's third electoral district with Chiang Wan-an, the son of former legislator Chiang Hsiao-yen, and city councilor Wang Hong-wei. After entering the second phase of the KMT primary election polls, Wang, who fell behind by more than 10% in the first round, decided to withdraw from the election, while Luo Shu-lei ultimately lost to Chiang Wan-an by more than 10%.

After leaving office, she devoted herself to painting and held personal exhibitions. During the 2022 Taiwanese local elections, Chiang Wan-an resigned as a legislator in order to run for mayor of Taipei City. After the election, she expressed her willingness to represent the Kuomintang in the by-election for the legislative vacancy in Taipei City's Third District, although she admitted in an interview with Taiwan Awakening that the chances were slim. In the end, Taipei City Councilor Wang Hong-wei was recruited and won the election.

== Death of Li Hsin ==
On September 28, 2018, the first anniversary of Taipei City Councilor Lee Hsin's death after falling from a building. Luo Shu-lei and Huang Chao-shun were accused by his girlfriend Guo Xinzheng in the documentary short series "Who fell to death of Li Xin" hosted by Sheng Zhuru framed by them. Luo Shu-lei believed that the video had caused damage to her reputation and applied to the court to remove the video. However, due to factors such as the ongoing trial and freedom of speech, the court ruled to deny the request and she could protest.

In July 2021, after Huang Chao-shun and Luo Shu-lei accused Guo Xinzheng and Sheng Zhuru of not prosecuting for damaging their reputation, they filed for reconsideration but were rejected by the Taiwan High Prosecutors Office, and the entire case was confirmed. In the aggravated defamation part of the lawsuit, Guo Xinzheng was sentenced to 4 months in prison and fined 8,000 yuan, and Sheng Zhuru was detained for 50 days. Both were fined, and the whole case was settled.

== Election record ==
year	Number of election terms	Electoral district	Political party to which	Number of votes	Vote rate	selected mark	Remark
2008	2008 Taiwanese legislative election		Kuomintang	5,010,801	58.12%		Ranked 14th
2012	2012 Taiwanese legislative election	Taipei City Constituency III	Kuomintang	118,503	56.07%		leading vote-getter in Taipei
