= Chiang Wan-an =

Taiwanese politician and lawyer (born 1978)

- 蔣萬安
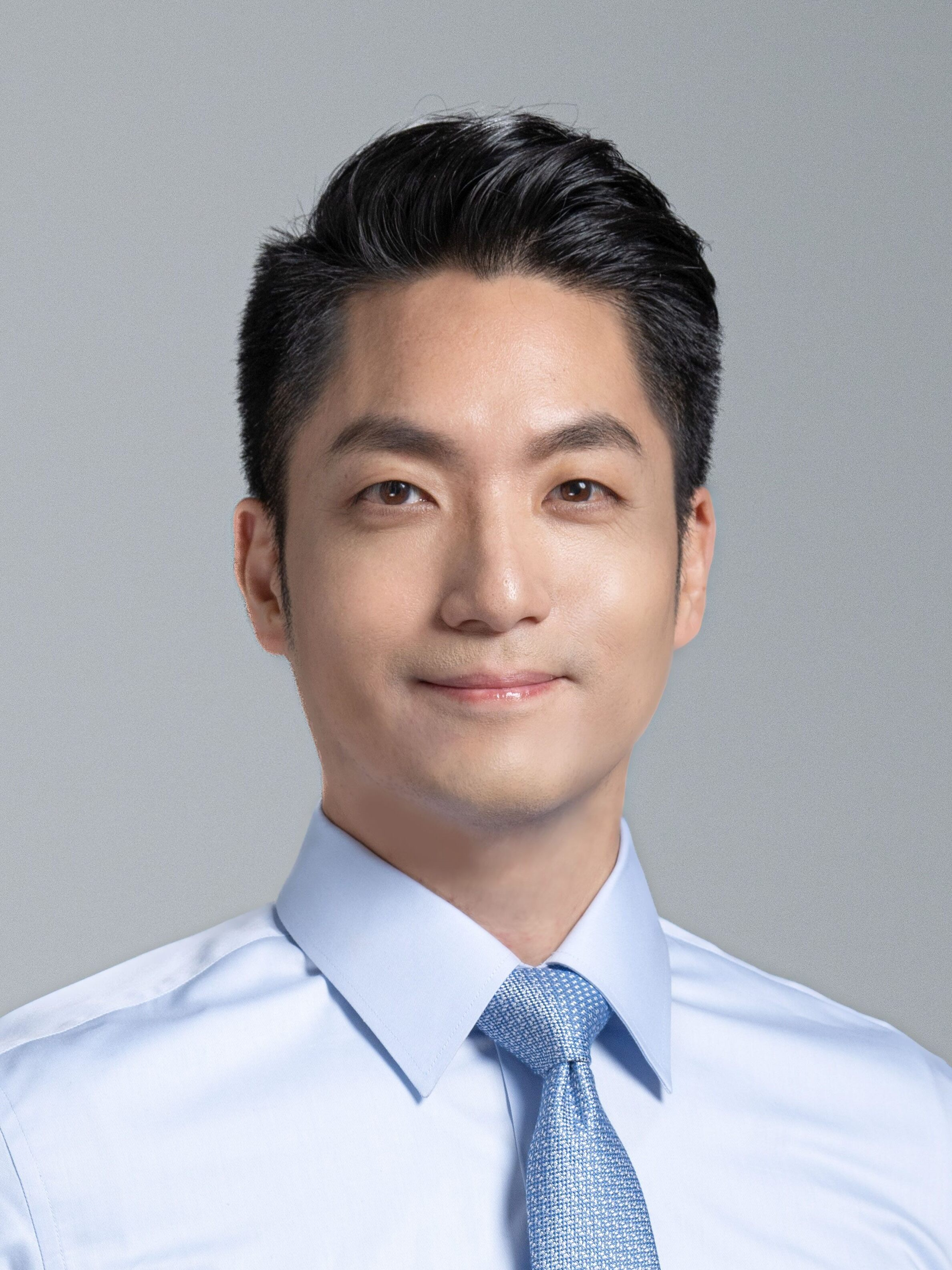
- Official portrait, 2022

14th Mayor of Taipei
- Incumbent
- Assumed office 25 December 2022
- Deputy: See list: Lee Shu-chuan; Lin Yi-hua; Chang Wen-te
- Preceded by: Ko Wen-je

Member of the Legislative Yuan
- In office 1 February 2016 – 10 November 2022
- Preceded by: Lo Shu-lei
- Succeeded by: Wang Hung-wei
- Constituency: Taipei III

Personal details
- Born: Chang Wan-an; 26 December 1978 (age 47) Taipei, Taiwan
- Party: Kuomintang
- Spouse: Shih Fang-ken (m. 2009)
- Relations: Chiang family (ostensible)
- Children: 3
- Parent: Chiang Hsiao-yen (father)
- Education: National Chengchi University (BA, LLB); University of Pennsylvania (LLM, JD)
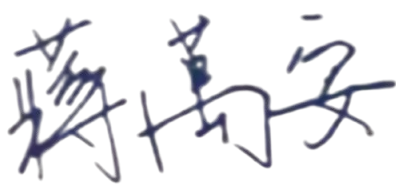
- Signature

Chinese name
- Traditional Chinese: 蔣萬安
- Simplified Chinese: 蒋万安
Transcriptions
Standard Mandarin
- Hanyu Pinyin: Jiǎng Wàn'ān
- Bopomofo: ㄐㄧㄤˇ ㄨㄢˋ ㄢ
- Wade–Giles: Chiang³ Wan⁴-an¹
Yue: Cantonese
- Jyutping: Zoeng^{2} Maan^{6}-On^{1}

Birth name
- Traditional Chinese: 章萬安
- Simplified Chinese: 章万安
Transcriptions
Standard Mandarin
- Hanyu Pinyin: Zhāng Wàn'ān
- Bopomofo: ㄓㄤ ㄨㄢˋ ㄢ
Yue: Cantonese
- Jyutping: Zoeng^{1} Maan^{6}-On^{1}

Chiang Wan-an (Chinese: 蔣萬安; pinyin: Jiǎng Wàn'ān; born Chang Wan-an; 26 December 1978), also known by his English name Wayne Chiang, is a Taiwanese politician and lawyer who has served as the 14th mayor of Taipei since 2022. A member of the Kuomintang (KMT), he is the youngest mayor in the history of the office.

Born and raised in Taipei, Chiang is the son of Kuomintang politician Chiang Hsiao-yen and is considered a great-grandson of Chiang Kai-shek. After graduating from National Chengchi University, he earned his master's degree in law and Juris Doctor from the University of Pennsylvania in 2004 and 2006, respectively. He then worked as a corporate lawyer in Silicon Valley and founded his own law firm. He resigned from his law practice in 2015 in order to run for office in Taiwan.

In the 2016 Taiwanese legislative election, Chiang won a seat representing Taipei City Constituency 3 in the Legislative Yuan, and was re-elected to the seat in 2020 for a second term. In the 2022 Taiwanese local elections, Chiang ran for the Taipei mayoralty, defeating former health minister Chen Shih-chung and former deputy mayor Huang Shan-shan. He assumed office on 25 December 2022 at age 43.

== Early life ==
Chiang (Note: His birth name was Chang Wan-an (Chinese: 章萬安; pinyin: Zhāng Wàn'ān).) was born in Taipei, Taiwan, on December 26, 1978. He has two older sisters, Chiang Hui-lan (蔣蕙蘭) and Chiang Hui-yun (蔣蕙筠), who graduated from Boston University and Emerson College, respectively. He is the only son of Kuomintang politician Chiang Hsiao-yen and his wife Helen Huang (黃美倫; Huáng Měilún). His father claims to be an illegitimate son of Chiang Ching-kuo, the only son of Chinese leader Chiang Kai-shek. Although Chiang Hsiao-yen's claim has not been formally recognized by the Chiang family, the family supported Hsiao-yen's rise in the Kuomintang. If true, Wan-an would be a great-grandson of Chiang Kai-shek.

Chiang Wan-an's contested familial relationship with Chiang Kai-shek, who ruled Taiwan after the Great Retreat, has been controversial due to Kai-shek's divisive legacy as either a symbol of anti-communism or dictatorship. At age six, Wan-an was introduced to Soong Mei-ling, though he remained unaware of his familial relation to Chiang Kai-shek until high school, when his father made his claims public. The family changed their surname from Chang to Chiang in 2005.

=== Education ===
Chiang graduated from Taipei Municipal Chien Kuo High School, where he was classmates with Huang Shih-chieh. Because he ranked at the top of his high school class, he was guaranteed admission to National Chengchi University, where he enrolled to study international relations. As an undergraduate, he represented the university at the Philip C. Jessup International Law Moot Court Competition and was recognized as an outstanding debater. In his sophomore year, he began pursuing a dual degree in diplomacy and law. He graduated in 2000 with two bachelor's degrees: a Bachelor of Arts in international studies and a Bachelor of Laws in public international law.

After graduation, Chiang spent a year and a half working as an attorney for Lee and Li, the largest law firm in Taiwan, and became a legislative aide in the National Assembly, where he wrote a petition to legalize flights between Taiwan and mainland China. In 2001, he was named a "young leader of Taiwan" and was introduced to U.S. president Bill Clinton.

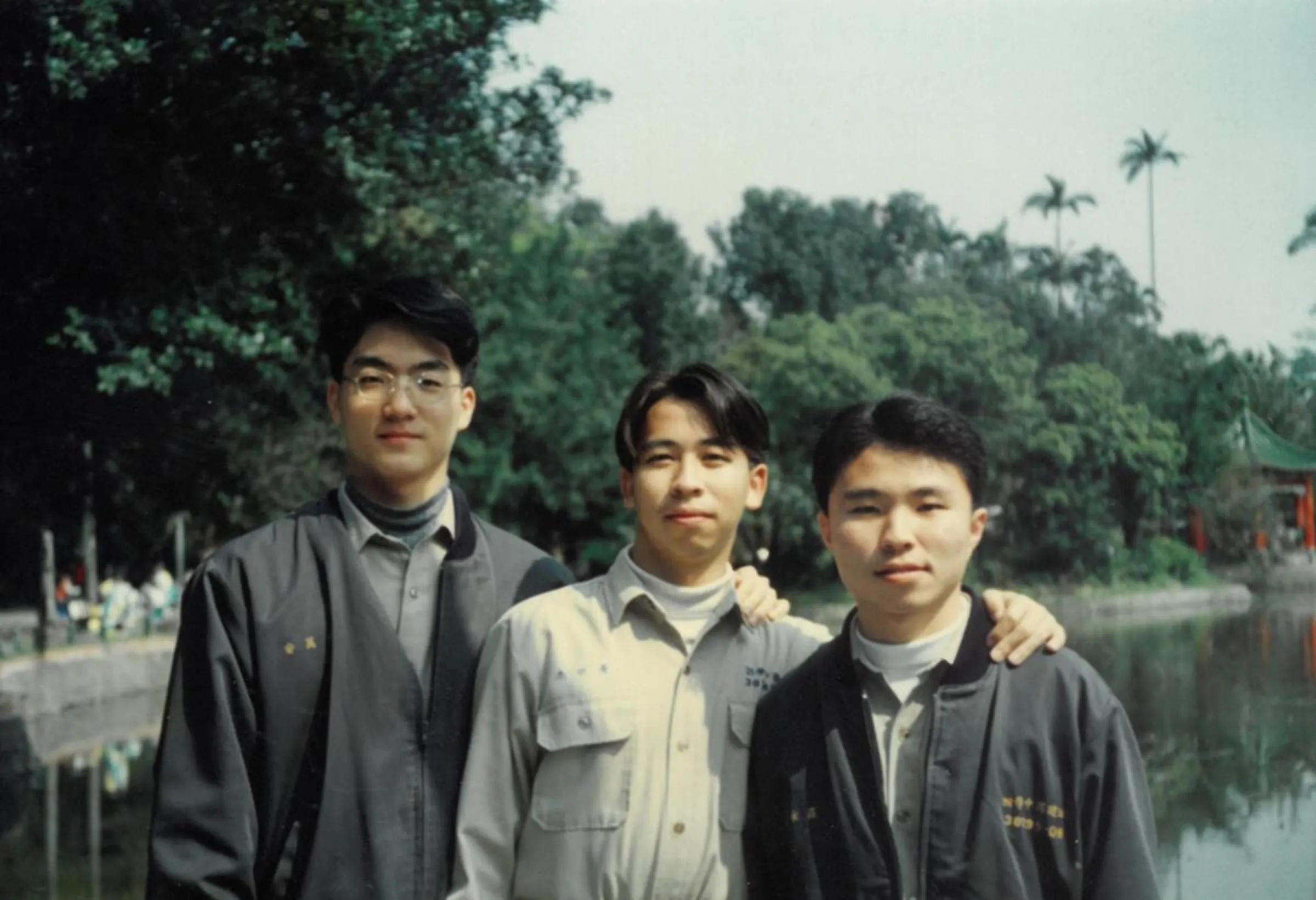
Chiang (left) as a pupil at Taipei Municipal Chien Kuo High School, pictured with classmate Huang Shih-chieh (center)

In 2002, Chiang left Taiwan to pursue graduate studies in the United States at the University of Pennsylvania, where he studied under sinologist Jacques deLisle. He earned his Master of Laws (LL.M.) in 2004 and his Juris Doctor (J.D.) in 2006 from the University of Pennsylvania Carey Law School. During his time as a law student, he frequently traveled between New York City and Philadelphia, and was classmates with future legislator Su Chiao-hui.

== Legal career (2006–2015) ==
After receiving his J.D. degree, Chiang became an associate attorney at the law firm of Wilson Sonsini Goodrich & Rosati in Palo Alto, California, starting in the fall of 2006. He was admitted as a member of the State Bar of California on December 11, 2007. Chiang later moved to the Crone Law Group, a law firm in Silicon Valley, and worked as an associate specializing in venture capital, corporate law, and securities law from 2009 to 2011. He was soon made a partner of the firm. After practicing for several years, he founded his own law firm, the Wan-tse International Law Firm (萬澤國際法務事務所), which specialized in commercial law.

== Legislative Yuan (2016–2022) ==
Chiang was inspired to enter politics after witnessing the Sunflower Student Movement in 2014. He returned to Taiwan in March 2015 to run for office, voluntarily relinquishing his U.S. green card, and resigned from his law practice.

=== First term ===
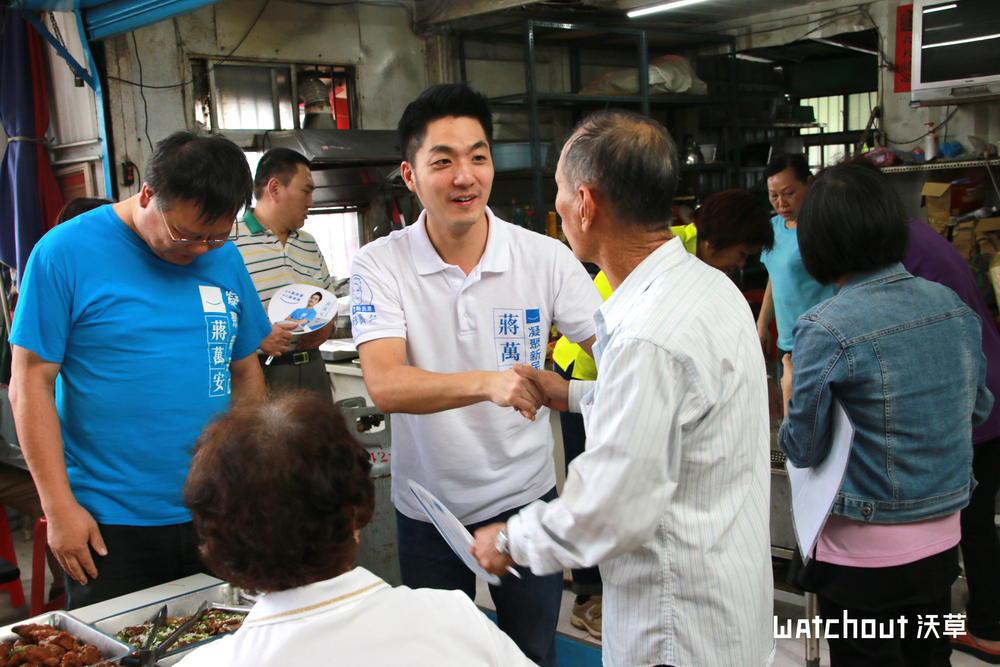
Chiang campaigning in Zhongshan District, Taipei, in October 2015

On March 29, 2015, Chiang announced his bid to represent Taipei City Constituency 3 as a member of the Kuomintang. In the party primaries, he ran against KMT legislator Luo Shu-lei, who previously held the constituency seat, and Wang Hung-wei, a KMT member of the Taipei City Council. After Luo failed to build a minimum lead majority of five percent in the April 2015 party primary, Chiang advanced to a second primary. On May 20, 2015, Chiang won the party's legislative primary with a majority of 55.376 percent, compared to Luo's 44.624 percent share.

After winning the KMT nomination for Taipei's third constituency, Chiang ran for the seat in the 2016 legislative election. The Democratic Progressive Party (DPP) originally nominated Liang Wen-chieh to challenge Chiang in the race, but Liang withdrew; Pan Chien-chih, a psychiatrist and independent candidate, joined the DPP and received the party's nomination to run against Chiang instead. On election day January 16, 2016, Chiang defeated Pan with a majority of 83,476 votes, compared to Pan's 66,998 share. He announced his victory at 7:40 p.m. that same day. Chiang's successful campaign to represent the third constituency of Taipei in the 9th Legislative Yuan came in contrast to the results of other KMT lawmakers in the 2016 legislative election, which saw the DPP flip traditionally KMT constituencies to win a clear majority. Chiang attributed the Kuomintang's losses in the elections to "ineffective governance".

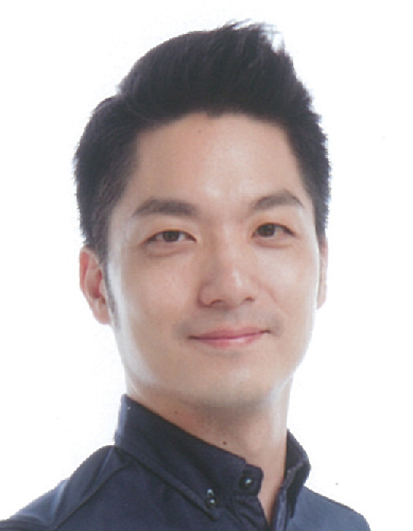
Chiang's official 9th Legislative Yuan portrait

In November 2015, Pan filed a legal motion to invalidate the results of the election, alleging that Chiang used a lottery to bribe voters during his campaign. On March 23, 2016, the Taipei District Prosecutors' Office concluded that there was insufficient evidence of vote buying, and thus would not press charges against Chiang, though Pan also filed a civil lawsuit to invalidate the election results which were heard in court in April 2016. In May 2016, the Taipei District Court ruled in favor of Chiang and dismissed Pan's lawsuit. The case ended on December 27, 2016, when the Taipei high court rejected an appeal by Pan to review the dismissal.

On February 1, 2016, Chiang was sworn in as a member of the 9th Legislative Yuan. As a legislator, he was a member of the Legislative Yuan's Social Welfare and Environmental Hygiene Committee responsible for proposing motions regarding elderly care, child welfare, and food safety. During his tenure, he became known for his opposition to proposed amendments to the Labor Standards Act and, during a 2019 protest in the legislature, drew widespread online attention after an image of legislator Chen Yu-jen embracing him during the protest went viral on social media.

=== Second term ===
Chiang ran for re-election in the 2020 Taiwanese legislative election. DPP spokeswoman Lee Yen-jung was initially considered to contest Chiang's seat in the Taipei third constituency, but she declined the party's nomination. On August 27, 2019, the DPP nominated former investment banker Enoch Wu to challenge Chiang instead. The race drew media attention as a "battle of two handsome men," both of whom came from prominent backgrounds and had a strong presence on social media. Chiang's campaign emphasized his grassroots initiatives in Taipei, such as the establishment of citywide legal clinics, while Wu, an advocate of Taiwan independence, campaigned on pro-democracy issues and cross-strait sovereignty.

On January 11, 2020, Chiang received a majority of 95,559 votes (51.1%)—compared to Wu's 82,453 (45.75%) share—and was re-elected for a second legislative term. His victory in that year's legislative election made him a leading KMT candidate for the Taipei mayoralty. He was sworn into the 10th Legislative Yuan on February 1, 2020. During his second term, Chiang presided over the founding of new legal clinics in Shilin District and Beitou District. In January 2021, he proposed a legislative amendment expanding compensation to White Terror victims. According to the South China Morning Post, Chiang was "rated as one of the best and most attentive lawmakers by local political monitoring groups" throughout his tenure in the Legislative Yuan.

== 2022 Taipei mayoral campaign ==
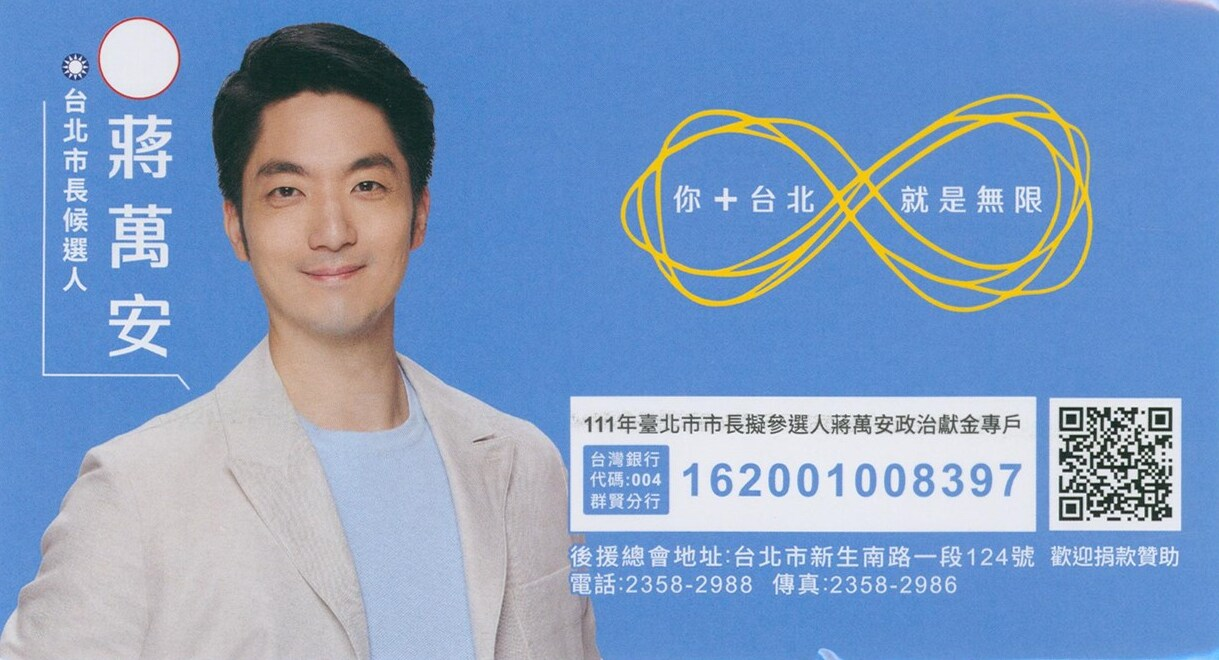
Campaign flyer during the 2022 Taipei mayoral election

By January 2022, Chiang was widely expected to announce his bid for the Taipei mayoralty after the Chinese New Year. On May 25, 2022, he was officially named the Kuomintang candidate for the Taipei mayoralty in the 2022 local elections. The next day, he announced that legislators Li Gui-min, Lee Te-wei, and Hung Mong-kai would serve as his campaign spokespersons, while legislators Lin Yi-hua, Lai Shyh-bao, Fai Hrong-tai, and Alex Tsai would serve as campaign advisors.

Vote percentage by district in the 2022 Taipei City mayoral election Chiang > 35% Chiang > 40% Chiang > 45% Chen > 40%

Chiang was expected to face DPP health minister Chen Shih-chung, who led the Ministry of Health and Welfare during the COVID-19 pandemic in Taiwan, and Huang Shan-shan, the incumbent deputy mayor affiliated with the Taiwan People's Party (TPP), in the mayoral race. Chen was nominated by the DPP on February 13, 2022. On July 15, Chen resigned from the health ministry to concentrate on the race, and announced on July 19 that his campaign advisors would include Chen Chien-jen, Rosalia Wu, Michelle Lin, and Kuan Bi-ling. Chiang did the same on November 10, resigning from his legislative seat to focus on his campaign. (Note: A by-election for Chiang's legislative constituency was scheduled for 8 January 2023.)

Chiang ran on a platform centered on modernization and reform, including support for lowering the voting age from 20 to 18, same-sex marriage, improving health insurance coverage, and expanding public transportation programs. His campaign also promoted developing Taipei into an equivalent of Silicon Valley. Chiang's relative youth as a candidate was described as a generational shift for the KMT, a party historically associated with an older political base with only a small minority of youth members. During the televised mayoral debate on November 5, Chiang advocated for developing Taipei into a tech hub, doubling paid maternity leave, and addressing the city's low real wages and high rent costs. The two-hour debate also saw Chiang reject a suggestion by Elon Musk recommending that Taiwan be a special administrative region of China.

On November 26, 2022, Chiang won the Taipei mayoral election with 42.29 percent of the vote, defeating both Chen (31.93%) and Huang (25.14%). Voter turnout in the election was high, averaging 67.7 percent. Chiang achieved landslide victories in 11 out of 12 of the city's administrative districts. His support was strongest in Wenshan District, a KMT stronghold; by contrast, Chen won one district, Datong District, a traditional DPP stronghold. On December 13, 2022, Chiang released his mayoral cabinet, with former Kaohsiung deputy mayor Lee Shu-chuan appointed as his deputy mayor.

Results of the 2022 Taipei Mayoral Election
Party	#	Candidate	Votes	Percentage
Kuomintang (KMT)	6	Chiang Wan-an (蔣萬安)	575,590	42.29%
Democratic Progressive (DPP)	12	Chen Shih-chung (陳時中)	434,558	31.93%
Independent	8	Huang Shan-shan (黃珊珊)	342,141	25.14%
Others			8,662	0.64%
Total			1,360,951	100.00%
Voter turnout			67.70%	

== Mayor of Taipei (2022–present) ==
=== Inauguration ===
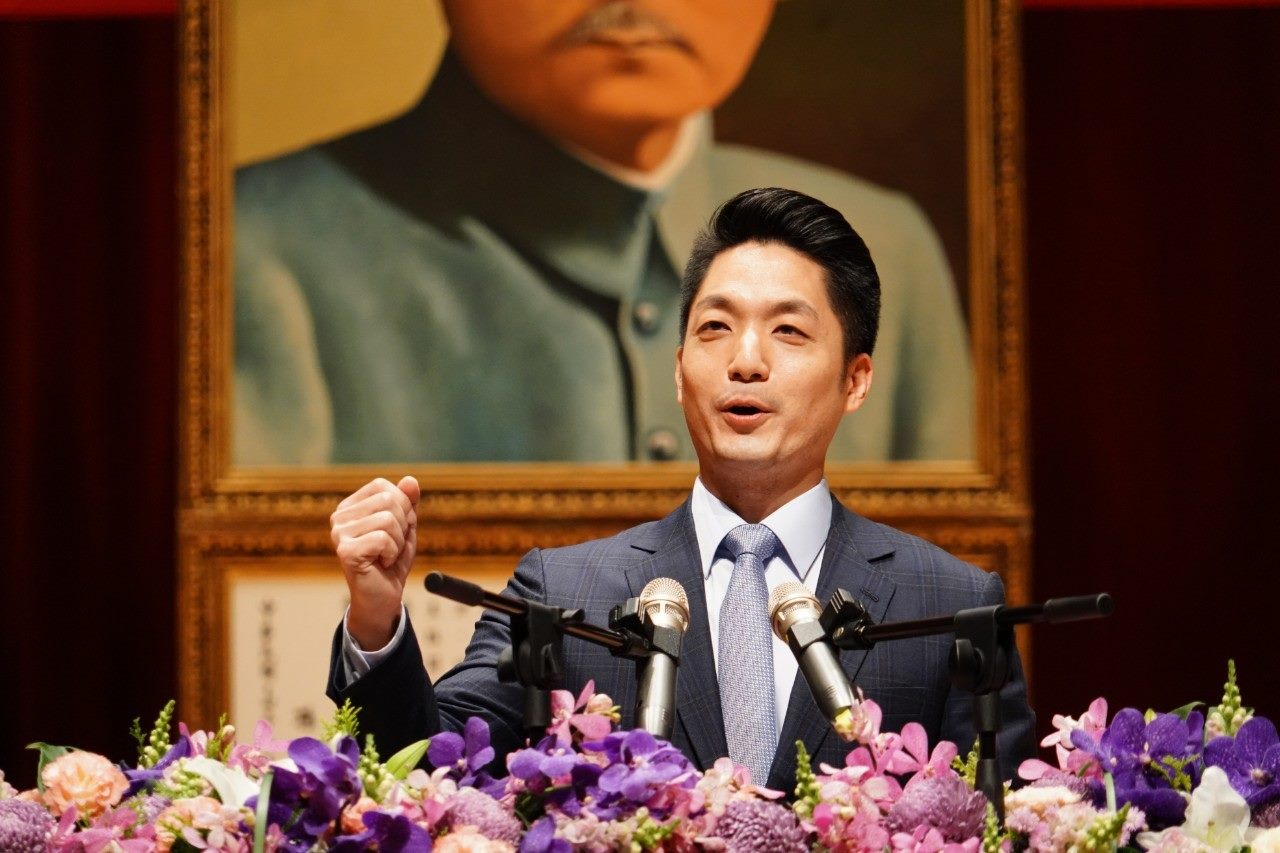
Chiang at his mayoral inauguration on December 25, 2022

On December 25, 2022, Chiang was sworn into office, succeeding Ko Wen-je. During his inauguration speech, Chiang promised "four windows of opportunity" for Taipei, including prosperity, fostering creative talent, environmental sustainability, and tourism. At age 43, he became the youngest mayor in the city's history. In his inaugural address, he outlined what he called four "windows of opportunity" for Taipei: economic prosperity, attracting and retaining creative talent, environmentally sustainable urban renewal, and expanding tourism around the city's local character and cultural heritage.

=== Administration ===
In January 2023, Chiang said that his administration would use childbirth bonuses, subsidies, and housing policy in an effort to raise Taipei's population above 2.5 million. The city subsequently doubled its payment for a first child from NT$20,000 to NT$40,000, while setting payments of NT$45,000 for a second child and NT$50,000 for a third or subsequent child. In March, Chiang raised the minimum monthly salary for childcare providers at privately managed, publicly funded nurseries to NT$38,000 and announced plans to reduce the maximum child-to-provider ratio from five-to-one to four-to-one.

Chiang at the Taipei Dome during the 2023 Asian Baseball Championship

Chiang's administration also launched five initiatives intended to accelerate urban renewal, including lower application thresholds, streamlined reviews, relaxed regulations, removal of administrative obstacles, and increased incentives; at the time, about 72 percent of the city's buildings were at least 30 years old. In May 2023, the city government announced that it planned to add 7,000 social housing units during Chiang's first term.

Chiang and other officials at a press conference for the 2024 Double Ten celebration at the Taipei Dome

The Taipei Dome, whose planning and construction had been delayed for decades, officially opened in October 2023 under Chiang's administration. In February 2024, his administration restored free use of YouBike bicycles for the first 30 minutes of each rental. Following restoration of the free-first-30-minutes policy, the system took 17 months to accumulate another 100 million rentals and reach its 400-million-rental milestone.

Taipei and New Taipei City jointly hosted the 2025 Summer World Masters Games in May 2025, the first edition of the event held in Asia, with more than 25,000 athletes from 107 countries participating. The opening ceremony was held at the Taipei Dome and was attended by Chiang and New Taipei mayor Hou You-yi.

Chiang at the National Police Agency during a briefing on the 2025 Taipei stabbings

In October 2025, Nvidia confirmed that it had selected two plots in the Beitou–Shilin Technology Park for its Taiwan headquarters, and Chiang said that the city would accelerate the administrative procedures required for the development. The following month, the city terminated an existing land-use agreement with Shin Kong Life Insurance for the desired plots, clearing the way for negotiations with Nvidia. In February 2026, the city government signed a contract granting Nvidia a 50-year land-rights lease, with an option for a 20-year extension, and royalties totaling NT$12.2 billion. Nvidia's submitted plan called for an investment of more than NT$40 billion in the headquarters and projected the creation of more than 10,000 jobs once the complex became operational.

As part of an initiative to restrict smoking in public spaces, Chiang's administration designated the Xinyi shopping district as a smoke-free area, with enforcement scheduled to begin on 1 November 2026. The city also established designated smoking rooms with negative-pressure ventilation systems, opening 12 such facilities between May and September 2026.

=== Education initiatives ===
Chiang (right) serving meals to elementary school students in September 2026, after implementing free school lunches in Taipei

In January 2026, Chiang announced that Taipei would provide free lunches to all students at the city's elementary and junior-high schools beginning that year. In February 2026, he announced a pilot program allowing employees with children under the age of 12 to reduce their daily working hours by one hour without a reduction in salary, with the city government subsidizing 80 percent of the wages corresponding to the reduced hours. The program began on 1 March 2026 and was then expanded in May, when Chiang increased the maximum subsidy available to each participating business from NT$100,000 to NT$200,000 and extended the pilot through December 2026.

In June 2026, Chiang announced six education initiatives, including plans to gradually reduce class sizes in public schools to 25 students in elementary schools, 26 in junior high schools, and 32 in senior high and vocational schools by the incoming academic year. The administration's free school lunch program for public and private elementary and junior high schools took effect at the beginning of the academic year in August 2026.

=== Cross-strait relations ===
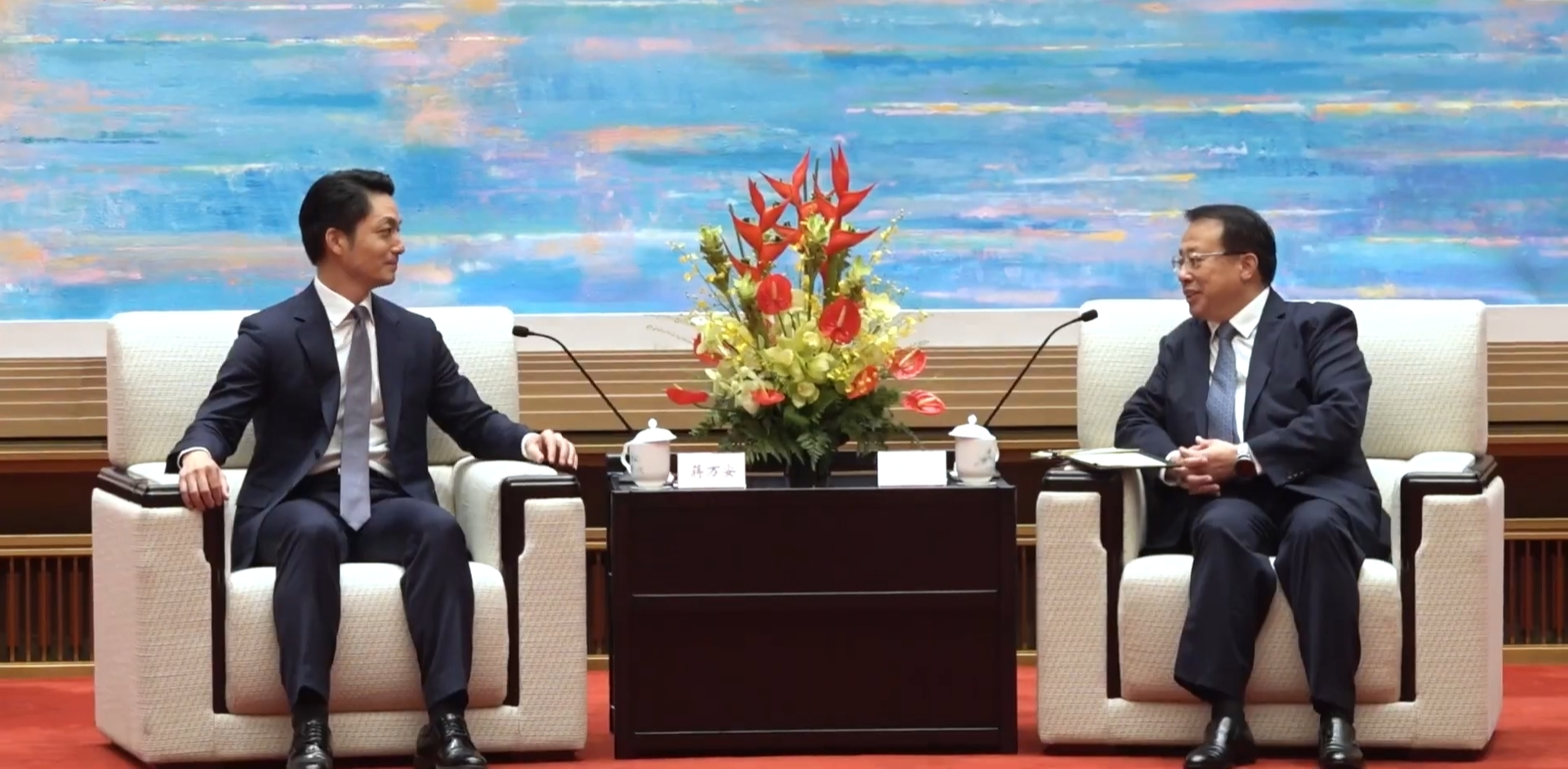
Chiang (left) and Gong Zheng at the 2023 Taipei–Shanghai City Forum

As part of the 2023 Taipei–Shanghai City Forum, Chiang traveled to Shanghai from August 29 to August 31 for his first participation of the forum as mayor. Taipei later hosted the forum in December 2024, when a delegation led by Shanghai vice mayor Hua Yuan visited the city amid heightened political and military tensions across the Taiwan Strait. Chiang called for "more dialogue and less confrontation" and urged a reduction in military activity, while reiterating his support for continued municipal exchanges. It was one of the few remaining official channels of communication between the two sides after Beijing suspended formal dialogue with Taiwan's central government in 2016.

Chiang returned to Shanghai for the forum in December 2025, where he said that he hoped the Taiwan Strait would become associated with "peace and prosperity" rather than conflict and instability. Officials from Taipei and Shanghai signed memoranda of understanding on water management and vocational training during the meeting.

== Personal life ==
Chiang met his wife, Shih Fang-ken (石舫亘), while they were classmates at National Chengchi University. After dating for ten years, they married on May 23, 2009. She was an executive at eBay and later returned to Taiwan and became involved in organizations promoting women in technology. She served as president of the Taiwan chapter of Girls in Tech, which she helped introduce to Taiwan in 2015. Chiang later said that he had proposed to Shih at a revolving restaurant in New York City while the couple were living in the United States.

Chiang and Shih have three sons. Their eldest son, Chiang Te-li (蔣得立), was born in 2011. Their second son, Chiang Te-yu (蔣得宇), was born on July 23, 2021. Their third son was born on January 27, 2023, about a month after Chiang took office as mayor.

In September 2023, Chiang was included on Time's Time 100 Next list, which documents "emerging leaders from around the world who are shaping the future and defining the next generation of leadership".

== Family tree ==
Chiang family tree

Soong May‑ling 宋美齡	Mao Fumei 毛福梅	Chiang Kai‑shek 蔣介石	Yao Yecheng 姚冶誠	Chen Jieru 陳潔如
Faina Chiang Fang‑liang 蔣方良	Chiang Ching-kuo 蔣經國	Chang Ya‑juo 章亞若 (mistress)	Shih Chin‑i 石靜宜	Chiang Wei‑kuo 蔣緯國 (adopted)	Chiu Ju‑hsüeh 丘如雪	Chen Yao‑kuang 陳瑶光 (adopted)
Alan Chiang Hsiao‑wen 蔣孝文	Amy Chiang Hsiao‑chang 蔣孝章	Alex Chiang Hsiao‑wu 蔣孝武	Eddie Chiang Hsiao‑yung 蔣孝勇	Winston Chang Hsiao‑tzu 章孝慈	John Chiang Hsiao‑yen 蔣孝嚴	Chiang Hsiao‑kang 蔣孝剛
Nancy Xu Nai‑jin 徐乃錦	Yu Yang‑ho 俞揚和	Wang Zhang‑shi 汪長詩	Michelle Tsai Hui‑mei 蔡惠媚	Elizabeth Fang Chi‑yi 方智怡	Chao Chung‑te 趙申德	Helen Huang Mei‑lun 黃美倫	Wang Yi‑hui 王倚惠
Theodore Yu Tsu‑sheng 俞祖聲	Chang Ching‑sung 章勁松	Chang Yo‑chu 章友菊	Vivian Chiang Hui‑lan 蔣惠蘭	Chiang Hui‑yün 蔣惠筠	Chiang Wan-an 蔣萬安
Chiang Yo‑mei 蔣友梅	Alexandra Chiang Yo‑lan 蔣友蘭	Johnathan Chiang Yo‑sung 蔣友松	Demos Chiang Yo‑bo 蔣友柏	Edward Chiang Yo‑chang 蔣友常	Andrew Chiang Yo‑ching 蔣友青	Chiang Yo‑chüan 蔣友娟	Chiang Yo‑chieh 蔣友捷

Notes
- Dashed lines represent marriages
- Dotted lines represent extra-marital relationships and adoptions
- Solid lines represent descendants

== Notes ==
Government offices
Preceded by Ko Wen-je	Mayor of Taipei; 2022 –	Succeeded by incumbent
