= Wang Hong Wei =

Wang Hong Wei is a human name, may refer to:

- Wang Hongwei (王宏伟; born 1969), Chinese actor
- Wang Hong-wei (王鴻薇; born 1964), Taiwanese politician who elected the legislator of Taipei City Constituency III from 2023
