= Huang Shan Shan =

Huang Shan Shan may refer to:

- Huang Shanshan (黄珊汕; born 1986), Chinese trampoline gymnast
- Huang Shan-shan (黃珊珊; born 1969), Taiwanese politician and lawyer
