= Enoch Wu =

Taiwanese politician

- 吳怡農
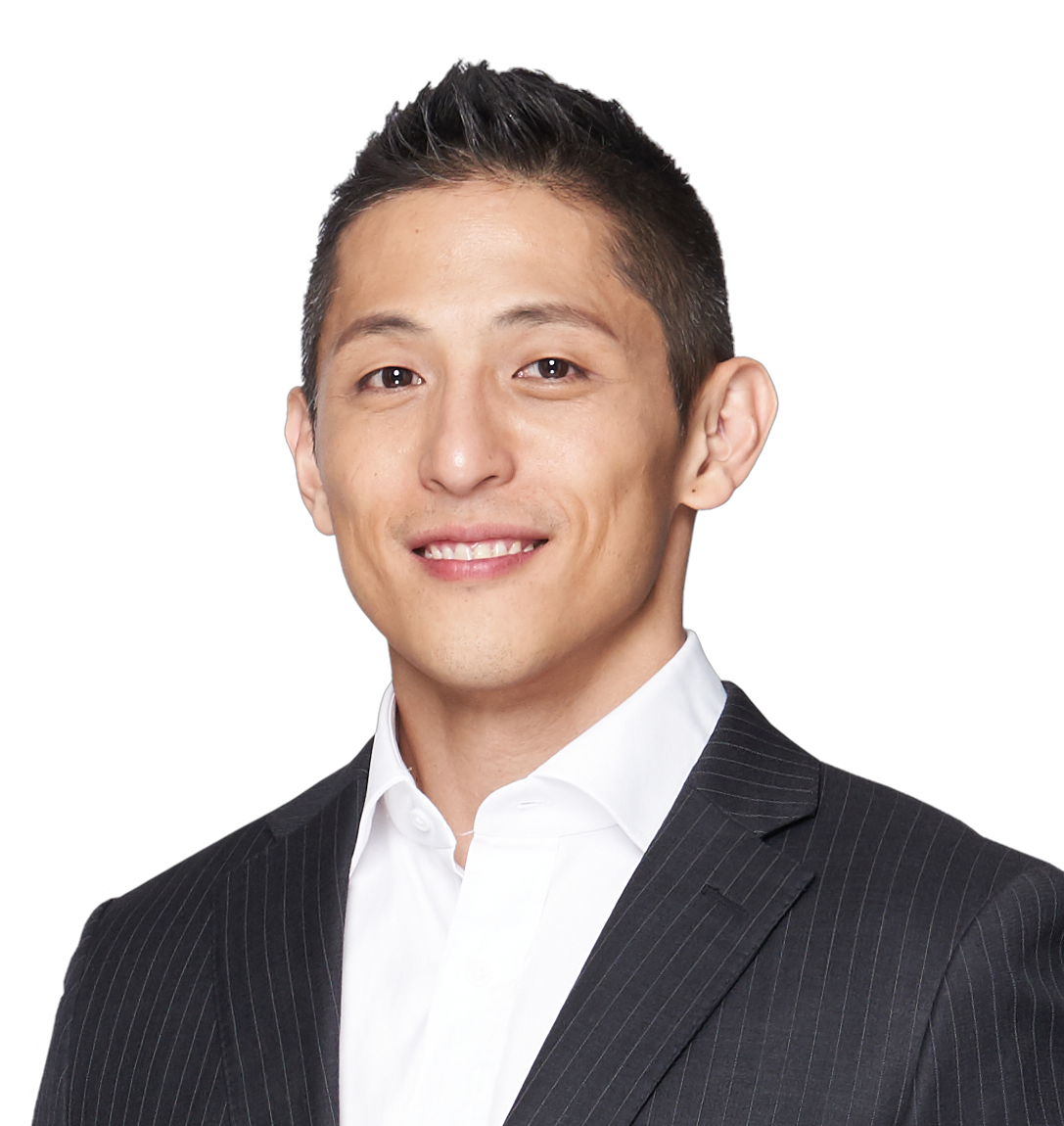

Chairperson of the Taipei chapter of the Democratic Progressive Party
- In office 9 February 2021 – 6 June 2022
- Preceded by: Chen Cheng-teh
- Succeeded by: Chang Mao-nan

Personal details
- Born: 31 December 1980 (age 45) Chicago, Illinois, U.S.
- Party: Democratic Progressive Party
- Spouse: Yen Tsai-wei (m. 2022)
- Education: Yale University (BA)

Military service
- Branch/service: Republic of China Army
- Years of service: 2014–2015
- Rank: Corporal

Enoch Wu (Chinese: 吳怡農; pinyin: Wú Yínóng; born 31 December 1980) is a Taiwanese politician, businessman, and former investment banker. Wu is the founder of Forward Alliance, a Taiwanese NGO focusing on national security.

After graduating from Yale University, Wu became an executive director at Goldman Sachs. In 2013, he left the finance industry to pursue public service in Taiwan. He served in the special forces of the Republic of China Army from 2014 to 2015. Following his national service, Wu joined Premier Lin Chuan's office to lead an interagency task force on Taiwan's security policies and served on the staff of Taiwan's National Security Council.

Wu ran for a legislative seat in Taipei's 3rd District in the 2020 general election, narrowly losing to the Kuomintang (KMT) incumbent Chiang Wan-an. From February 2021 to June 2022, he served as the Democratic Progressive Party (DPP)'s Taipei Chapter Chair.

== Early life and education ==
Wu was born on December 31, 1980, in Chicago, Illinois, to Lin Huei-ying (林惠英) and Wu Nai-teh. His parents met as university students. At the time of his birth, his father, Nai-teh, was pursuing a Ph.D. in political science at the University of Chicago. Wu's father was a political scientist at Academia Sinica, where he studied political identity and transitional justice. His mother, Huei-ying, had a career in advertising and now dedicates her time to an educational nonprofit.

Wu returned to Taiwan at age 6 after his father completed his doctorate, then attended elementary school and middle school in Taipei. In 1995, Wu moved to the United States for high school. He was a student at high schools in Illinois and Michigan before moving to New Hampshire, where he graduated from Phillips Exeter Academy.

After high school, Wu attended Yale University, where he graduated with a Bachelor of Arts (B.A.) in economics in 2003. As an undergraduate at Yale College, he co-founded the Yale chapter of America Counts, a U.S. Department of Education initiative, and won the college's Seton Elm-Ivy Award for outstanding public service in 2002.

== Career before politics ==
After graduating Yale in 2003, Wu worked at Goldman Sachs in Hong Kong, primarily for the Special Situations Group, focusing on investment opportunities in Asia. He became an executive director for Goldman but, in 2013, left the company to pursue public service in Taiwan. He renounced his U.S. citizenship when he was 32 years old.

He served with the Taiwanese Army's Special Forces Command from 2014 to 2015. Upon completing his national service as a corporal, he worked as a freelance journalist covering defense.

== Political activities ==
=== Government service ===
In 2017, Wu joined the office of Premier Lin Chuan, where he led an interagency task force to review Taiwan's protective security policies for government affairs. From 2017 to 2019, Wu served on the staff of Taiwan's National Security Council, where his portfolio included homeland security and critical infrastructure protection.

=== 2020 legislative campaign ===
In the 2020 Taiwanese legislative election, Wu represented the DPP in Taipei's 3rd district against Kuomintang incumbent Chiang Wan-an.

He ran on a national security platform, calling for reforms to national service, greater investment in military education, and accountability in defense spending. Wu also advocated for the lowering of the voting age from 20 to 18.

Wu received 99,539 votes and lost the election, 45.50% to Chiang's 51.44%, nearly upsetting the incumbent in a traditionally KMT district.

=== 2023 legislative campaign ===
Following Chiang's election as mayor of Taipei, a by-election was scheduled, and Wu was named the DPP candidate for Taipei's 3rd district a second time, Taipei City Councilor Wang Hung-wei ran for the open seat as the KMT candidate. On January 8, 2023, Wu received 54,739 votes and lost the election.

=== Democratic Progressive Party ===
From 2020 to 2021, he served as deputy director of the New Frontier Foundation, a think tank affiliated with the DPP. From February 2021 to June 2022, Wu served as the Chairperson of the DPP's Taipei Chapter.

=== Positions ===
Wu believes that national service must be reformed into a whole-of-society effort. An outspoken advocate for civil defense, he believes that it requires all genders serving across all functions.

Cautioning against over-reliance on authoritarian regimes, he also promotes economic diversification and emphasizes the necessity of a collective effort by all democratic countries to counter China. Wu advocates for the creation of a regional security bloc.

Beyond security issues, Wu supports the Hong Kong democratic movement, LGBTQ+ rights, energy security, and tax reforms.

== Forward Alliance ==
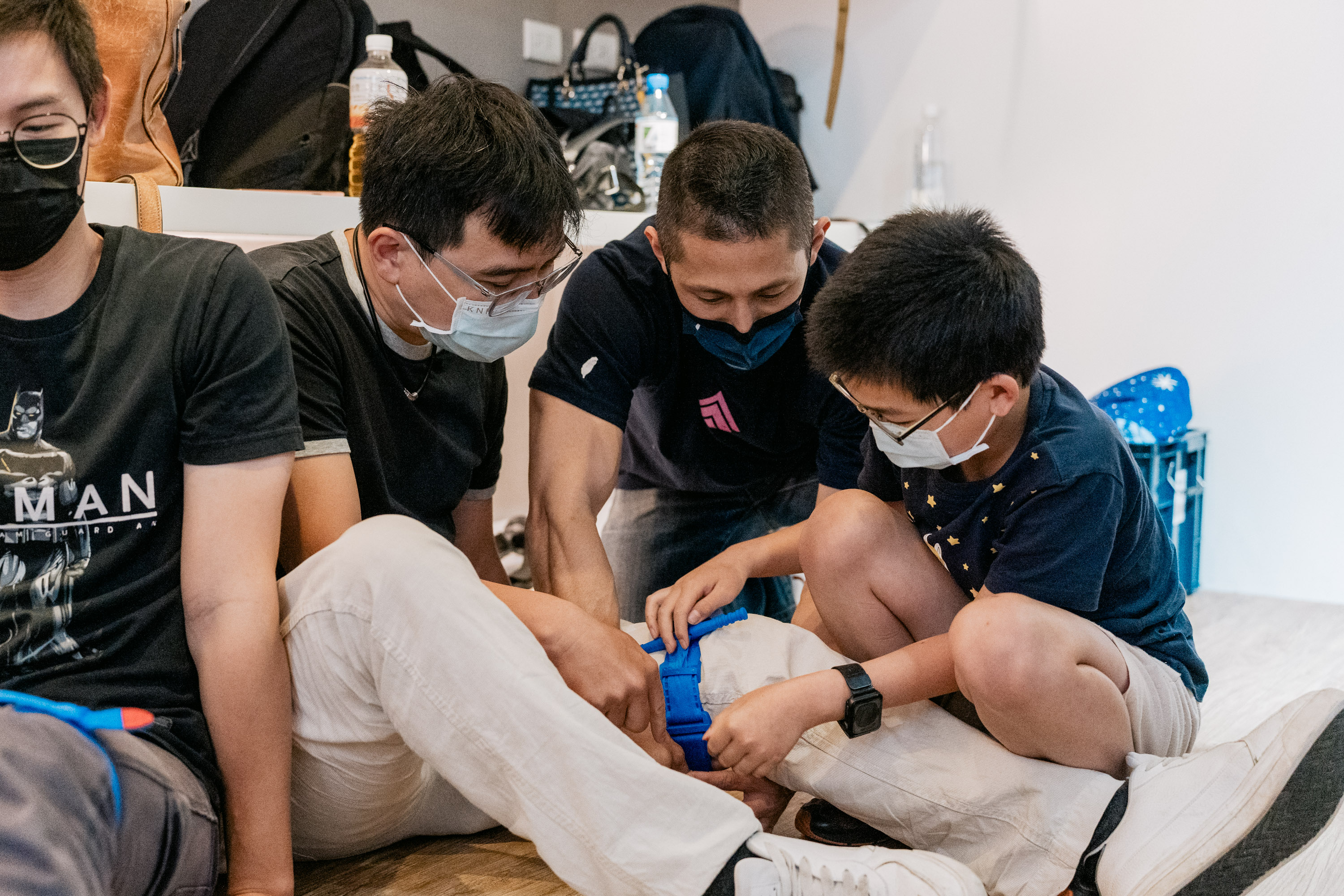
Enoch Wu teaches a child to place a tourniquet on his father at a Forward Alliance workshop

In 2020, Wu founded Forward Alliance with the goal of improving Taiwan's national security through greater public awareness, policy advocacy, and civic participation.

=== Time 100 Next ===
Recognizing his work with Forward Alliance, Time Magazine selected Enoch Wu for the 2022 Time 100 Next. Time commended, "Enoch Wu wants to give every Taiwan citizen the know-how to protect their community. As the threat level rises from Beijing…. Wu is providing civilians emergency-response training for both natural and man-made disasters." Wu extended the honor to Forward Alliance partners, including volunteers, first responders, and NGOs.

== Personal life ==
Wu was heavily influenced by his family and family friends' involvement in Taiwan's democratic movement. While in graduate school, his father Wu Nai-teh was an editor for dissident magazines, including Formosa Magazine and The Movement Magazine, advocating for democratic reforms while Taiwan was under martial law. After obtaining his PhD and returning to Taiwan, Wu Nai-teh was refused employment for two years at Academia Sinica, the premier research academy, on the grounds of harboring "Taiwanese independence and subversive tendencies" despite unanimous faculty approval.

Civic engagement was a significant part of his upbringing. At just nine years old, Wu began joining his family in protests and citizen movements. In middle school, Wu collected signatures for a nuclear power plant referendum.

On December 5, 2022, Wu announced that he had married his girlfriend in October.
