= Shanghai–Taipei City Forum =

Annual forum between Shanghai and Taipei

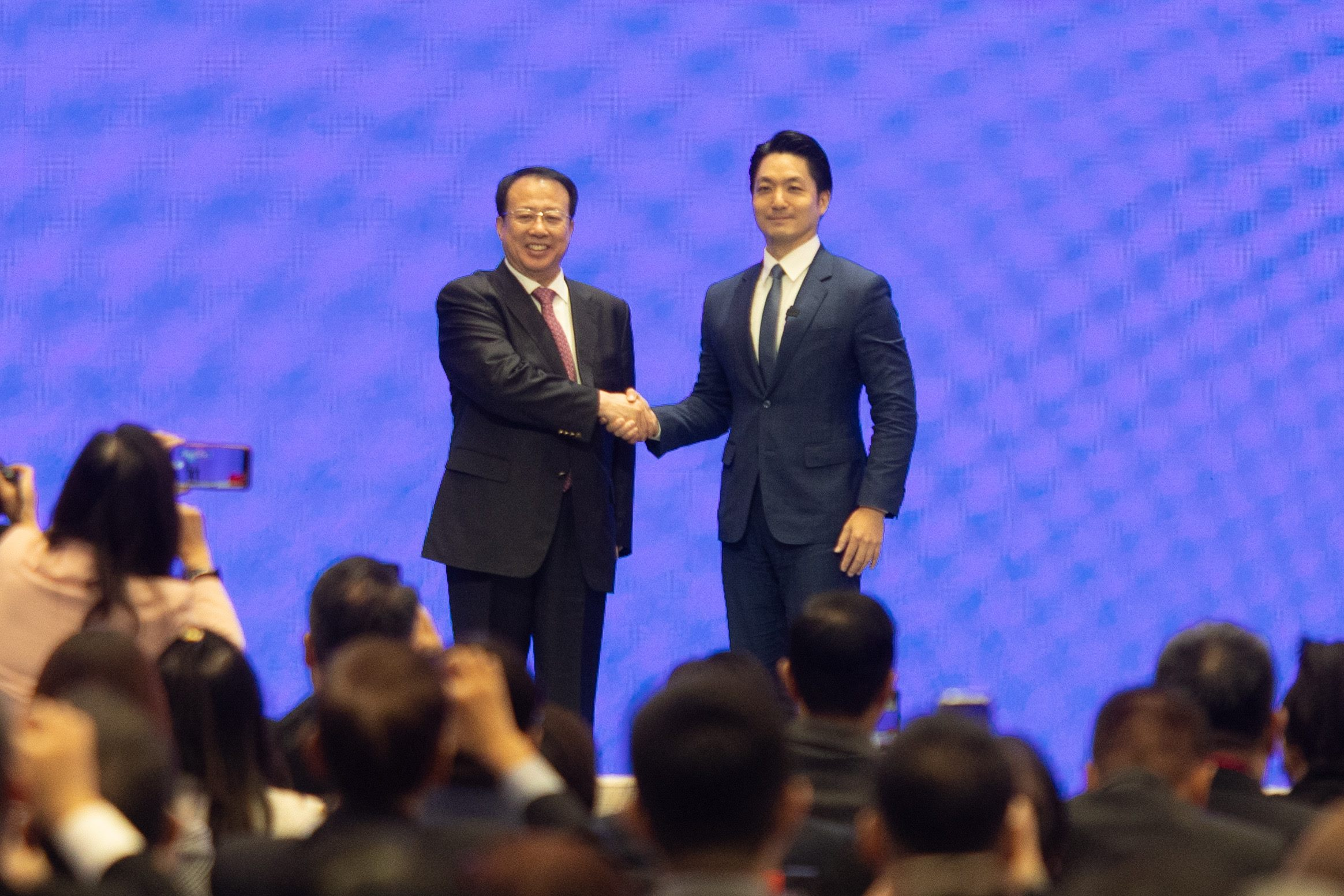
Shanghai mayor Gong Zheng and Taipei mayor Chiang Wan-an shaking hands at the 2025 Shanghai–Taipei City Forum

The Shanghai–Taipei City Forum (simplified Chinese: 上海-台北城市论坛; traditional Chinese: 上海-臺北城市論壇; pinyin: Shànghǎi-Táiběi Chéngshì Lùntán) or Taipei–Shanghai City Forum (simplified Chinese: 台北-上海城市论坛; traditional Chinese: 臺北-上海城市論壇; pinyin: Táiběi-Shànghǎi Chéngshì Lùntán) is an annual forum between the government and civilians of Shanghai and Taipei.

The forum has been described as a way to reduce tensions between Taipei and Beijing by Taipei mayor Chiang Wan-an.

== History ==
The forum was initially proposed in 2001 by civilian group as a channel for exchange between the two cities, and eventually the forum was launched in 2010 by Taipei mayor Hau Lung-pin.

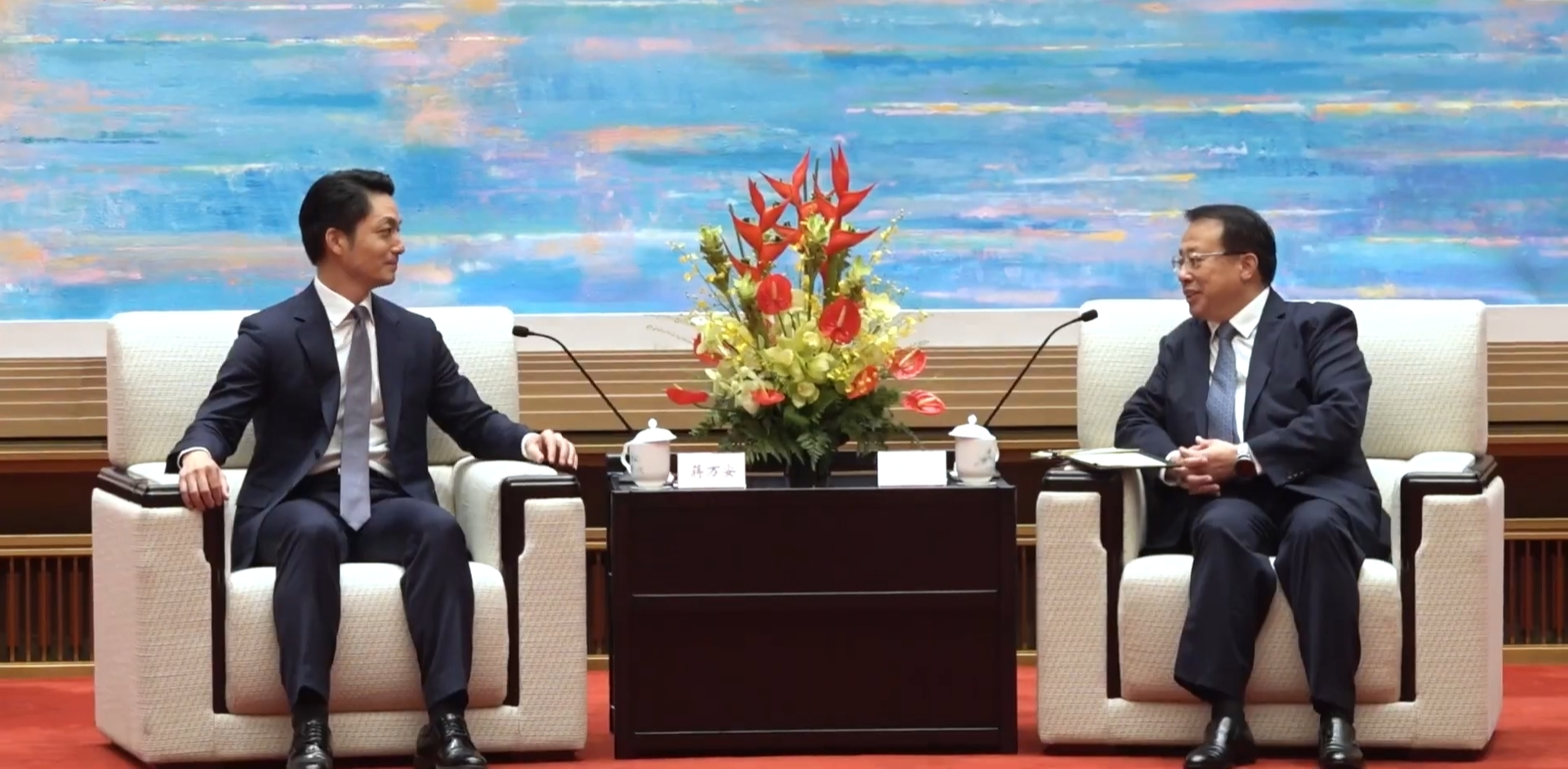
Chiang Wan-an and Gong Zheng at the Shanghai–Taipei City Forum in 2023

During the 2023 edition of the forum, the mayors of Shanghai and Taipei stressed the importance of exchanges between the two cities and cross-strait cooperation.

Taiwan's Mainland Affairs Council approved planned agreements between Taipei and Shanghai before the 2024 edition of the forum, which it said will focus on medical care and environmental initiatives.

== Forum ==
Sequence	Date	Venue City	Theme/Remark
1st	April 2010	Taipei	
2nd	July 2011	Shanghai	
3rd	16 August 2012	Taipei	
4th	July 2013	Shanghai	
5th	9 June 2014	Taipei	
6th	August 2015	Shanghai	
7th	22–23 August 2016	Taipei	Showing city vitality
8th	2 July 2017	Shanghai	Healthy City
9th	20 December 2018	Taipei	
10th	July 2019	Shanghai	Innovation, Cooperation & Future
11th	22 July 2020	Online	
12th	1 December 2021	Online	New Economy and New Development
13th	19 July 2022	Online	
14th	29 August 2023	Shanghai	New trends, new development
15th	17 December 2024	Taipei	Smart governance for a sustainable future
16th	28 December 2025	Shanghai	Science and Technology Changes Lives

== See also ==
- Cross-Strait relations
