= 2024 Taiwanese President of Legislative Yuan election =

11th Legislative Yuan presidential election
- February 1, 2024

Needed to win: Majority of votes (57) in first round Simple majority in second round
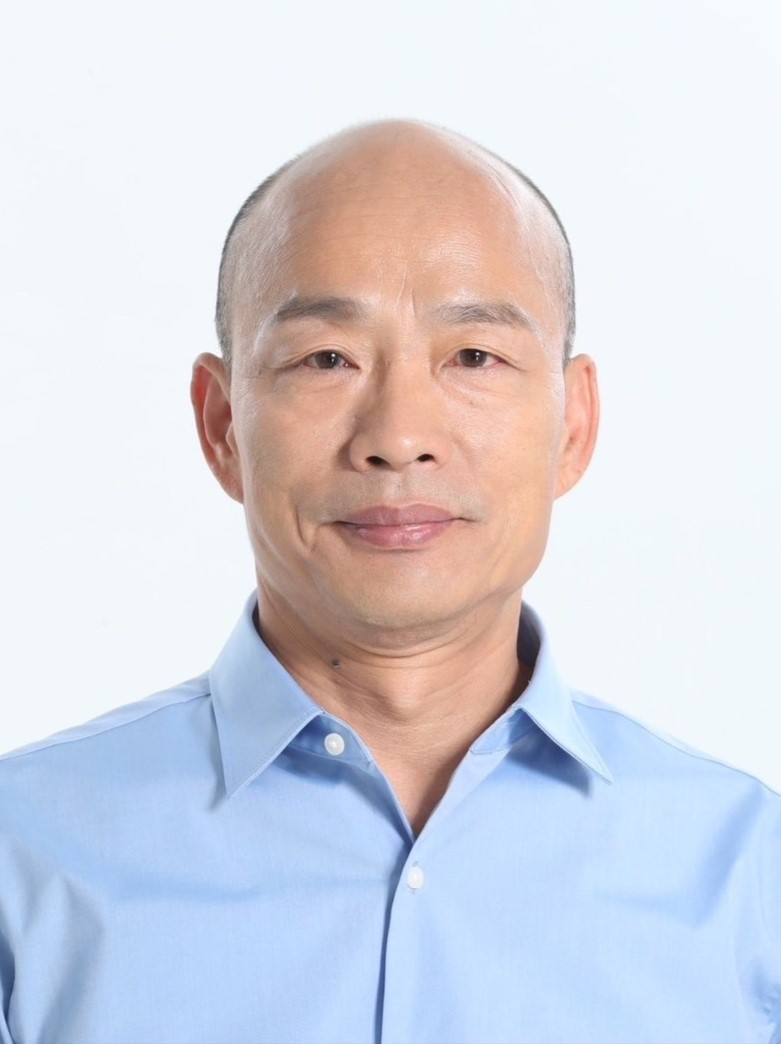

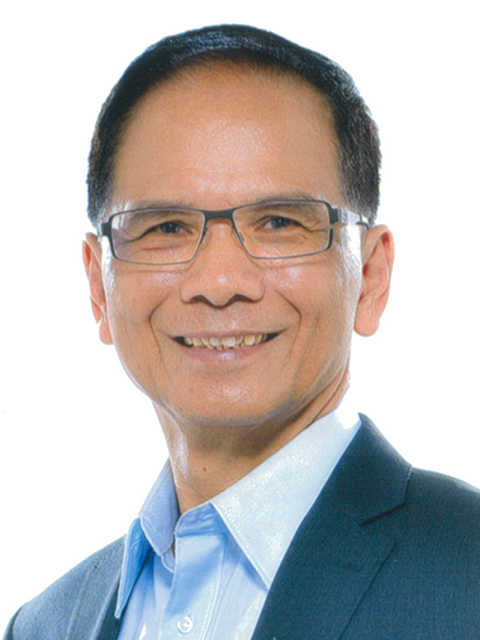

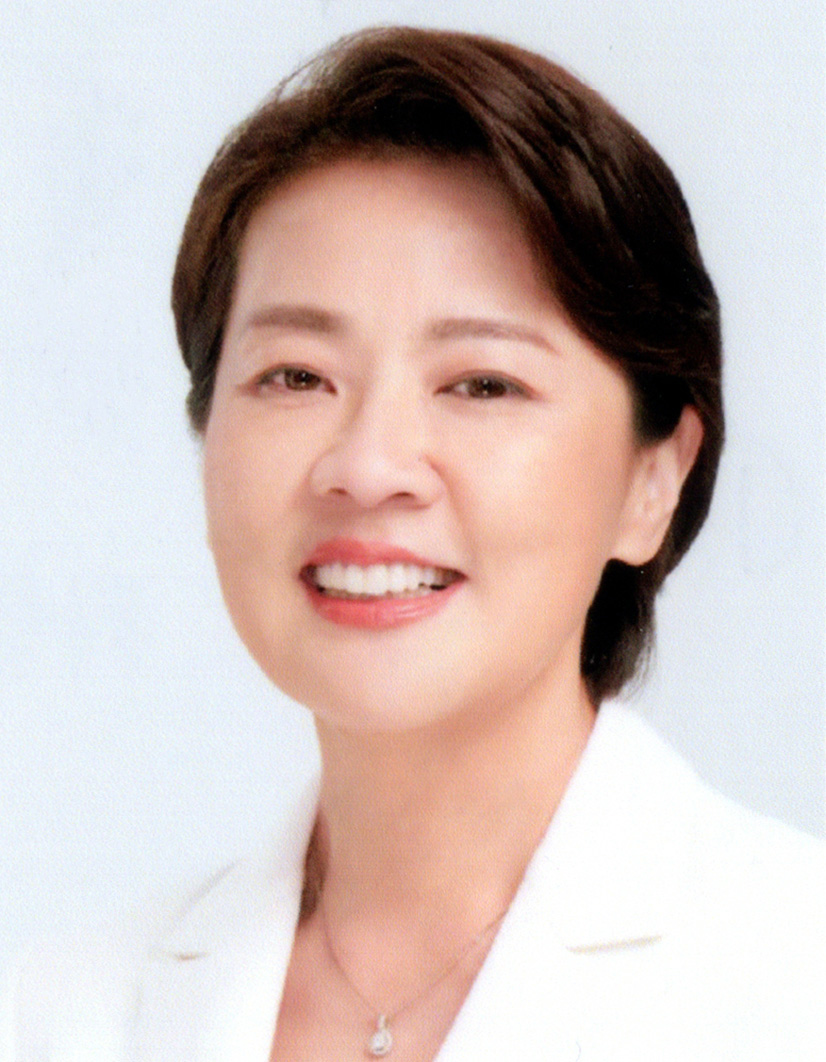
Candidate	Han Kuo-yu	You Si-kun	Huang Shan-shan
Party	KMT	DPP	TPP
First round	54 (48.21%)	51 (45.53%)	7 (6.25%)
Second round	54 (51.42%)	51 (48.57%)	Eliminated
President before election
You Si-kun
Democratic Progressive Party
Elected President
Han Kuo-yu
Kuomintang

The election for the president and vice president of the 11th Legislative Yuan (Note: Chinese: 第十一屆立法院院長選舉; pinyin: Dì shíyī jiè lìfǎyuàn yuànzhǎng xuǎnjǔ) was held on February 1, 2024. It marked the 11th election of the president and vice president of the Legislative Yuan since the promulgation of the Constitution of the Republic of China. The election adopted a system of direct, equal, single-vote, and relative majority voting. According to the Regulations Governing the Mutual Election of the President and Vice President of the Legislative Yuan, the president and vice president are elected by and from among the legislators, with all members of the Legislative Yuan automatically serving as candidates. The Kuomintang (KMT), the Democratic Progressive Party (DPP), and the Taiwan People's Party (TPP) each nominated their own candidates for the positions of president and vice president.

In the election for the president of the Legislative Yuan, Kuomintang candidate Han Kuo-yu and Democratic Progressive Party candidate You Si-kun entered the runoff after both failed to secure a majority of the votes in the first round. As for the Vice Presidency, Johnny Chiang from KMT defeated DPP's Tsai Chi-chang in the second round.

== Background ==
The Legislative Yuan has a president (or legislative speaker) and a vice president, both of whom are elected by and from among the members of the Legislative Yuan. The Constitution of the Republic of China provides that the Legislative Yuan shall have one president and one vice president, elected by the legislators themselves. Under the Organic Law of the Legislative Yuan, their terms last until the expiration of the term of the legislature in which they were elected. The president oversees the affairs of the Legislative Yuan, while the vice president acts on behalf of the president when the president is unable to perform his or her duties. The election of the president and vice president is held on the first day of the first session of each legislative term, after the members report for duty and take the oath of office. The two offices are elected separately; all legislators are automatic candidates, and a candidate is elected if he or she receives more than half of the votes of the members present. If no candidate receives such a majority on the first ballot, a second ballot is held among the two candidates with the highest number of votes, and the candidate receiving more votes is elected.

The presidential and legislative elections in 2024 saw Democratic Progressive Party (DPP) leader Lai Ching-te elected as President, and the Legislative Yuan became hung parliament for the first time since 2000 where no party holds a majority. The ruling party DPP secured 51 seats, while the Kuomintang (KMT) won 52 seats and became the largest opposition party, and the Taiwan People's Party (TPP) obtained 8 seats. Two independent legislators were elected, both of whom joined the Kuomintang caucus. (Note: A legislative caucus in the Legislative Yuan is a formal group of lawmakers from the same political party. Under Article 33 of the Organic Law of the Legislative Yuan, a party may form a caucus if it wins at least three seats, and each caucus must maintain at least three members.)

With neither the KMT nor the DPP holding a majority of seats, the TPP became the key swing force in determining the outcome of the Legislative Yuan presidential election. On January 26, 2024, TPP Chairman Ko Wen-je invited both major parties to attend a closed-door meeting with the TPP caucus. TPP legislator Huang Kuo-chang requested that the candidates for President and Vice President of the Legislative Yuan from both parties state their positions on four proposed parliamentary reforms and the single-convener system, among other issues. On January 29, KMT candidates for President and Vice President of the Legislative Yuan, Han Kuo-yu and Johnny Chiang, as well as DPP candidates You Si-kun and Tsai Chi-chang, separately visited the TPP caucus to seek its support. On January 31, the TPP decided to nominate Huang Shan-shan as its candidate for President of the Legislative Yuan. Ultimately, the party tickets for the President and Vice President of the Legislative Yuan were the DPP's You–Tsai ticket (You Si-kun and Tsai Chi-chang), the KMT's Han–Chiang ticket (Han Kuo-yu and Johnny Chiang) and the TPP's Huang–Chang ticket (Huang Shan-shan and Chang Chi-kai).

== Candidates ==
=== President ===
- You Si-kun (DPP): On January 13, he was re-elected as at-large constituency legislator and had previously served as President of the Legislative Yuan. According to his own statements, he intended to pursue parliamentary reform and believed that there would be no opposition within the party. On January 29, following an internal party meeting, the Democratic Progressive Party decided to field the same combination of President and Vice President from the previous Legislative Yuan—the "You–Tsai ticket" —to seek re-election. He later stated, "We are confident, but not certain."(我們有信心但沒把握)
- Han Kuo-yu (KMT): On January 13, he was elected as at-Large constituency legislator. According to his own statements, he hoped to restore the Legislative Yuan's proper role of oversight and checks and balances, promote cooperative lawmaking, improve parliamentary functions, and advance cooperation between the KMT and TPP. On January 24, following an internal party meeting, the Kuomintang approved the "Han–Chiang ticket" (韓江配) to run for President and Vice President of the Legislative Yuan. In addition, KMT Chairman Eric Chu stated that the KMT caucus would vote as a unified bloc.
- Huang Shan-shan (TPP): On January 13, she was elected as a party-list legislator. Earlier, Taiwan People's Party Chairman Ko Wen-je had invited the Kuomintang and the Democratic Progressive Party to attend a closed-door meeting with the TPP caucus. However, on January 31, after deliberation by the TPP's eight legislators, the party announced that Huang Shan-shan would run for President of the Legislative Yuan. According to her own statements, she hoped to take the will of the entire electorate into consideration and to advance party reconciliation and social harmony through issue-based cooperation.

=== Vice president ===
- Tsai Chi-chang (DPP): On January 13, he was re-elected as a district legislator and had previously served as Vice President of the Legislative Yuan. Within the party, there was strong support for the "You–Tsai ticket". You Si-kun stated that he would only be in a position to speak if the party formally nominated him, and that the decision rested with the party, adding that he believed Tsai Chi-chang was well-suited for the role. On January 29, the Democratic Progressive Party internally approved the "You–Tsai ticket" to seek re-election as President and Vice President of the Legislative Yuan.
- Johnny Chiang (KMT): On January 13, he was re-elected as a district legislator. On January 18, it was announced that Han Kuo-yu had asked Johnny Chiang to run for Vice President of the Legislative Yuan, with the hope that they would form the "Han–Chiang ticket" and advance or withdraw together. On January 22, the Kuomintang formally approved the "Han–Chiang ticket" to contest the election for President and Vice President of the 11th Legislative Yuan.
- Chang Chi-kai (TPP): On January 13, he was elected as a party-list legislator. On February 1, the day of the election, Chang Chi-kai was asked whether the Taiwan People's Party would nominate a candidate for Vice President of the Legislative Yuan. He responded, "Probably—we have eight people, you can take a guess". However, the party had not mentioned a vice presidential candidate on January 31. According to the voting results, all TPP legislators ultimately cast their votes for Chang Chi-kai.

== Opinion poll ==
Prior to the election for President of the Legislative Yuan, Faith and Trust News Network conducted a public opinion survey. You Si-kun received 31.8% support, Han Kuo-yu received 28.6%, and Huang Shan-shan received 20%. The remaining percentage consisted of respondents who were undecided, had no opinion, or chose other options.

== Protest ==
On February 1, the day of the election, pro-Taiwan independence groups—including the Green Party Taiwan, the Dr. Chen Wen-chen Memorial Foundation, and the World United Formosans for Independence—launched the "Reject China's Choice" campaign and held a protest near the Legislative Yuan. They accused Han Kuo-yu of acting as an agent of the Chinese Communist Party and called on legislators not to vote for him.

== Result ==
In the first round of voting, all 51 members of the Democratic Progressive Party caucus voted for the DPP's candidate, all 54 members of the Kuomintang caucus (including two independents) voted for the KMT's candidate, and all eight members of the Taiwan People's Party caucus voted for the TPP's candidate. However, legislator Chen Gau-Tzu accidentally damaged her ballot. After review by the acting presiding chair of the Legislative Yuan, Ker Chien-ming, the ballot was ruled invalid, resulting in the TPP candidate Huang Shan-shan receiving only seven votes in the presidential election. Chen Gau-Tzu later apologized for the incident and resigned as caucus secretary-general. Fellow TPP legislator Huang Kuo-chang and party chairman Ko Wen-je both stated that party members who defect in voting should be expelled. Following the incident, Huang Shan-shan described it as a minor mistake and said that no party disciplinary action would be taken, while Ko Wen-je stated that although it did not constitute vote defection, disciplinary measures were still advisable. On February 6, 2024, the TPP Central Evaluation Committee decided that Chen Gau-Tzu had committed a "non-intentional violation of party discipline" and imposed a two-month suspension of her powers as a central committee member.

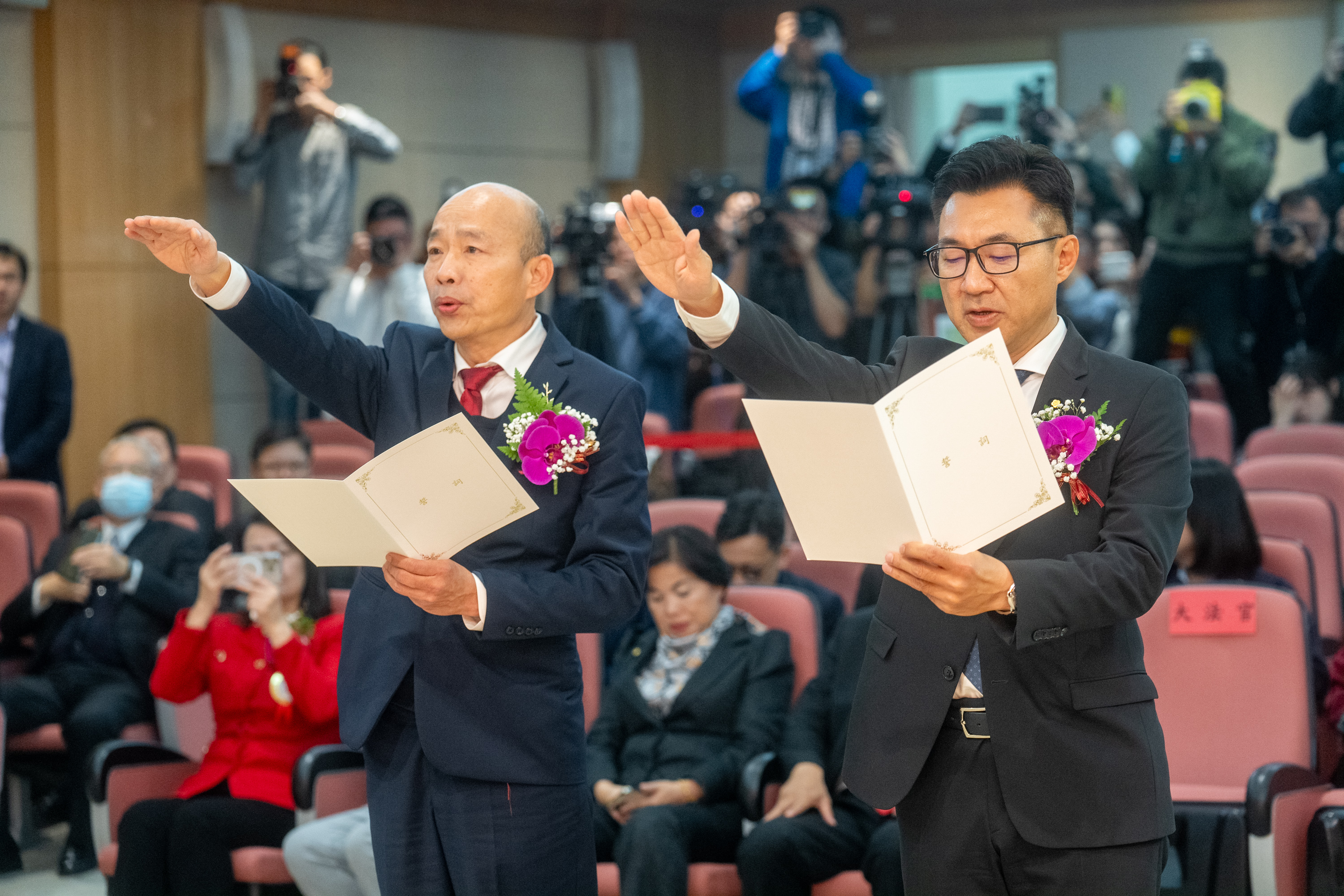
Oath of office ceremony

As neither of the top two candidates in the first round of voting for president and vice president of the Legislative Yuan—respectively from the Kuomintang and the Democratic Progressive Party—secured a majority, a second round of voting was conducted in accordance with the Regulations Governing the Mutual Election of the President and Vice President of the Legislative Yuan. Because the Taiwan People's Party candidates had been eliminated in the first round, all eight members of the TPP caucus were absent from the second round of voting. In the second round, both the DPP and KMT caucuses unanimously maintained their first-round voting choices. As a result, KMT candidate Han Kuo-yu was elected President of the 11th Legislative Yuan with 54 votes, and KMT candidate Johnny Chiang was elected vice president of the 11th Legislative Yuan with 54 votes. Following the election, You Si-kun resigned from his legislative position.

=== President ===
Candidate	Party	First round		Second round	
Candidate	Party	Votes	%	Votes	%
Han Kuo-yu	Kuomintang	54	48.21	54	51.43
You Si-kun	Democratic Progressive Party	51	45.54	51	48.57
Huang Shan-shan	Taiwan People's Party	7	6.25		
Total		112	100.00	105	100.00
Valid votes		112	99.12	105	100.00
Invalid/blank votes		1	0.88	0	0.00
Total votes		113	100.00	105	100.00
Registered voters/turnout		113	100.00	113	92.92

=== Vice president ===
Candidate	Party	First round		Second round	
Candidate	Party	Votes	%	Votes	%
Johnny Chiang	Kuomintang	54	47.79	54	51.43
Tsai Chi-chang	Democratic Progressive Party	51	45.13	51	48.57
Chang Chi-kai	Taiwan People's Party	8	7.08		
Total		113	100.00	105	100.00
Valid votes		113	100.00	105	100.00
Invalid/blank votes		0	0.00	0	0.00
Total votes		113	100.00	105	100.00
Registered voters/turnout		113	100.00	113	92.92
