= Forward Alliance =

Think tank in Taiwan

- Formation: May 2020; 6 years ago
- Type: Think tank
- Headquarters: Taipei
- Website: forward.org.tw

The Forward Alliance (Chinese: 壯闊台灣) is a Taiwanese national security and civil defense think tank.

== Overview ==
They are a national security think tank based in Taipei, Taiwan.

According to The Guardian the Forward Alliance "advocates for greater awareness of defence issues and national security.”

== History ==
The Forward Alliance was founded by politician and former special forces soldier Enoch Wu. Wu believes that “The best way to deter military conflict is to demonstrate a credible national will to resist, by combining military readiness with civil preparedness.”

Following the beginning of the 2022 Russian invasion of Ukraine, public participation in training programs run by the Forward Alliance increased greatly.

== Operations ==
The group runs workshops to train civilians in disaster response and civil defense.

== See also ==
- Kuma Academy
