= Taipei City Constituency 3 =

Constituency of the Legislative Yuan of Taiwan

Taipei City Constituency III
- Single-member constituency for the Legislative Yuan
- District(s): Zhongshan & parts of Songshan

Current constituency
- Created: 2008
- Members: John Chiang Hsiao-yen (2008–2012); Lo Shu-lei (2012–2016); Chiang Wan-an (2016–2022); Wang Hung-wei (since 2023)

Taipei City Constituency III (Chinese: 臺北市第三選舉區; pinyin: Táiběi Shì Dì-sān Xuǎnjǔ Qū) includes all of Zhongshan and most of Songshan in central Taipei. The district was created in 2008, when all local constituencies of the Legislative Yuan were reorganized to become single-member districts.

== Current district ==
- Zhongshan
- Songshan: 3 sub-districts
  - Dongshe: 9 urban villages
    - Zhonghua, Minfu, Dongchang, Songji, Longtian, Minyou, Dongguang, Dongshi, Jingzhong
  - Sanmin: 8 urban villages
    - Sanmin, Dongrong, Xindong, Futai, Jieshou, Zhuangjing, Xinyi, Fujin
  - Benzhen: 3 urban villages
    - Ziqiang, Pengcheng, Anping

== Legislators ==
| Representative | Party | Dates | Notes |
|---|---|---|---|
| John Chiang Hsiao-yen | Kuomintang | 2008–2012 | |
| Lo Shu-lei | Kuomintang | 2012–2016 | |
| Chiang Wan-an | Kuomintang | 2016–2022 | Resigned |
| Wang Hung-wei | Kuomintang | 2023– | |

== Electoral results ==
=== 2008 ===
Legislative Election 2008
| Party | Candidate | Votes | % | ±% |
|---|---|---|---|---|
| Kuomintang | John Chiang | 99,959 | 60.25 | |
| Democratic Progressive | Julian Kuo | 63,773 | 38.44 | |
| TSU | Xie Fumi （謝馥米） | 1,854 | 1.12 | |
| TCA | Jian Ruikuan （簡瑞寬） | 176 | 0.11 | |
| TCA | Li Linhao （李林耀） | 128 | 0.08 | |
| Majority | | 36,186 | 21.81 | |
| Total valid votes | | 165,890 | 98.70 | |
| Rejected ballots | | 2,178 | 1.30 | |
| Kuomintang win (new seat) | | | | |
| Turnout | | 168,068 | 61.74 | |
| Registered electors | | 272,241 | | |

=== 2012 ===
Legislative Election 2012
| Party | Candidate | Votes | % | ±% |
|---|---|---|---|---|
| Kuomintang | Lo Shu-lei（羅淑蕾） | 118,503 | 56.07 | ▼4.18 |
| Democratic Progressive | Chien Yu-yen（簡余晏） | 89,417 | 42.31 | ▲3.87 |
| Home | Yang Zhangyan（楊長燕） | 3,423 | 1.62 | New |
| Majority | | 29,086 | 13.76 | ▼8.05 |
| Total valid votes | | 211,343 | 98.65 | |
| Rejected ballots | | 2,901 | 1.35 | |
| Kuomintang hold | | Swing | ▼4.03 | |
| Turnout | | 214,244 | 76.43 | ▲14.69 |
| Registered electors | | 280,311 | | |

=== 2016 ===
Legislative Election 2016
| Party | Candidate | Votes | % | ±% |
|---|---|---|---|---|
| Kuomintang | Chiang Wan-an | 89,673 | 46.68 | ▲9.39 |
| Independent | Pan Chien-chih (潘建志) | 73,797 | 38.42 | New |
| SDP | Lee Yen-jong (李晏榕) | 23,706 | 12.34 | New |
| Independent | Chen Keyin (陳科引) | 1,448 | 0.75 | New |
| Independence | Lin Xinkai (林新凱) | 794 | 0.41 | New |
| MCFAP | Li Chengyue (李成嶽) | 721 | 0.38 | New |
| Independent | Huang Lixiang (黃麗香) | 607 | 0.32 | New |
| TCA | Gao Shi-en (高士恩) | 541 | 0.28 | New |
| Peace Pigeon Union Party | Qiu Zhenghao (邱正浩) | 450 | 0.23 | New |
| Independent | Zhao Yanjie (趙燕傑) | 352 | 0.18 | New |
| Majority | | 15,876 | 8.26 | ▼5.50 |
| Total valid votes | | 192,089 | 98.07 | |
| Rejected ballots | | 3,788 | 1.93 | |
| Kuomintang hold | | Swing | | |
| Turnout | | 195,877 | 67.56 | ▼8.87 |
| Registered electors | | 289,911 | | |

=== 2020 ===
Legislative Election 2020
| Party | Candidate | Votes | % | ±% |
|---|---|---|---|---|
| Kuomintang | Chiang Wan-an | 112,784 | 51.44 | ▲4.76 |
| Democratic Progressive | Enoch Wu | 99,539 | 45.40 | New |
| People's | Kimyung Keng (何景榮) | 5,730 | 2.61 | New |
| Stabilizing Force Party | Tian Fangyu (田方宇) | 1,209 | 0.55 | New |
| Majority | | 13,245 | 6.04 | ▼2.22 |
| Total valid votes | | 219,262 | 99.24 | |
| Rejected ballots | | 1,681 | .76 | |
| Kuomintang hold | | Swing | | |
| Turnout | | 220,943 | 76.48 | ▲8.92 |
| Registered electors | | 288,875 | | |

=== 2023 by-election ===
2023 by-election
| Party | Candidate | Votes | % | ±% |
|---|---|---|---|---|
| Kuomintang | Wang Hung-wei | | 52.26 | ▲0.82 |
| Democratic Progressive | Enoch Wu | | 47.27 | ▲1.87 |
| Majority | | | 4.99 | ▼1.05 |
| Total valid votes | | | | |
| Rejected ballots | | | | |
| Kuomintang hold | | Swing | ▲0.82 | |
| Turnout | | | | |
| Registered electors | | | | |

=== 2024 ===
Legislative Election 2024
| Party | Candidate | Votes | % | ±% |
|---|---|---|---|---|
| Kuomintang | Wang Hung-wei | 105,050 | 52.52 | ▲1.08 |
| Democratic Progressive | Hsieh Pei-fen （謝佩芬） | 89,850 | 44.92 | ▼0.48 |
| Independent | Chen Yuan-Fa （陳源發） | 1,851 | 0.93 | New |
| Taiwan Renewal Party | Yang Shi-Rui （楊時睿） | 1,378 | 0.69 | New |
| MiLinguall Party | Cheng I-Lang （陳一郎） | 1,107 | 0.55 | New |
| The People Union Party | Yu Hsin-Tsao （余新造） | 596 | 0.30 | New |
| Institutional Island of Saving the World | Kao Shih En （高士恩） | 195 | 0.10 | New |
| Majority | | 15,200 | 7.60 | ▲1.56 |
| Total valid votes | | 200,027 | 97.57 | |
| Rejected ballots | | 4,976 | 2.43 | |
| Kuomintang hold | | Swing | ▲0.78 | |
| Turnout | | 205,003 | 73.92 | ▼7.21 |
| Registered electors | | 277,328 | | |
