= Marr Chang-chi =

Taiwanese chemist and politician

- 梅長錡
- Education: National Taiwan University (BS); University of California, Berkeley (PhD)
- Political party: People First Party
- Other political affiliations: Kuomintang

Marr Chang-chi (Chinese: 梅長錡) is a Taiwanese chemist and politician.

== Education and career ==
Marr attended National Taiwan University, then obtained a doctorate in chemistry at the University of California, Berkeley. She remained in the United States to pursue her career in related industries. Marr subsequently became research director at Applied Materials Company, the vice president of CDE Engineering Company, and chief technology officer at Lan Corporation. Marr served as a member of the Legislative Yuan in Taiwan from 2005 to 2008, representing overseas Chinese on behalf of the People First Party. As a legislator, she was active in interpellation sessions regarding technology. She was placed on the Kuomintang preliminary party list as an at-large legislative candidate in 2008, with the joint endorsement of the Kuomintang and People First Party.
