= Wang Hung-wei =

Taiwanese politician (born 1964)

- 王鴻薇
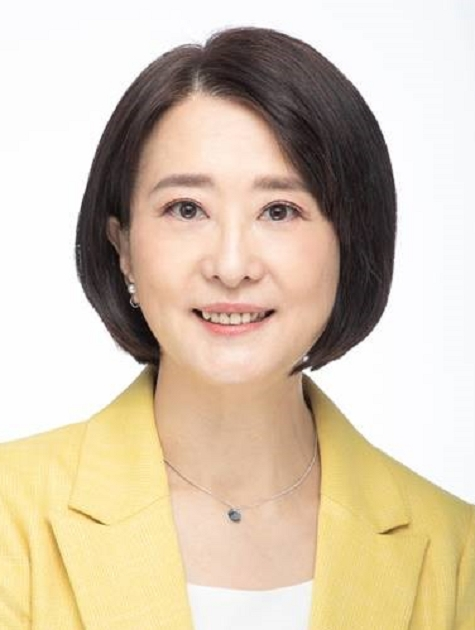

Member of the Legislative Yuan
- Incumbent
- Assumed office January 16, 2023
- Preceded by: Chiang Wan-an
- Constituency: Taipei City Constituency III

Taipei City Councilor
- In office December 25, 2006 – January 16, 2023
- Constituency: Third electoral district (Songshan–Xinyi)

Personal details
- Born: July 10, 1964 (age 62) Keelung, Taiwan
- Party: Kuomintang
- Other political affiliations: New Party (2006-2013)
- Spouse: Tao Yun-cheng
- Children: 3
- Education: National Chengchi University (BA)

Wang Hung-wei (Chinese: 王鴻薇; pinyin: Wáng Hóngwēi; born July 10, 1964) is a Taiwanese politician who has been a member of the Legislative Yuan representing Taipei City Constituency III since 2023. A member of the Kuomintang (KMT), she is also the deputy secretary-general of the party's legislative caucus.

Formerly a journalist, Wang was a New Party member from 2006 to early 2013, when she joined the Kuomintang. She was re-elected as a member of the Taipei City Council for five terms. Since 2017, she has also served as the deputy chairman of the Kuomintang Cultural Communication Committee. She succeeded Chiang Wan-an in a 2023 by-election, and was reelected to a full term in January 2024.

== Early life and education ==
Wang was born on July 10, 1964, in Keelung, Taiwan. Her family originated from Tanggu District in Tianjin, China. Her father was a sailor who arrived in Taiwan after the Chinese Civil War during the Great Retreat in 1949, having been separated from his family in mainland China. After being separated from her husband, Wang's mother traveled to Hong Kong, where she stayed for a period with the assistance of relatives before moving to Taiwan to reunite with him. Wang's paternal grandmother also traveled through Hong Kong before settling in Taiwan.

Wang attended Taipei Municipal Minquan Elementary School and Taipei Municipal Ren Ai Junior High School. She graduated from Taipei First Girls' High School. She then enrolled at National Chengchi University, where she studied journalism. She graduated with a Bachelor of Arts in 1987 as a member of the university's 47th graduating class. As an undergraduate, Wang began a relationship with fellow journalism student Tao Yun-cheng, who later became her husband.

== Career ==
After graduation, Wang worked as a journalist, mainly writing financial and economic news. She has been employed as a finance and economics writer by the Taiwan Times, the Commercial Times, and the United Daily News. While working at Lianhe Daily, she also served as deputy director of the Interview Center and director of the Greater Taipei Center.

=== Political career ===
==== 2006–2013: New Party and Taipei City Councilor ====
Wang joined the New Party in 2006, and was first elected a Taipei City Councilor in the 2005–06 Taiwanese local elections, succeeding Alex Fai. Wang won reelection in 2006 and 2010.

Wang ran for a seat in Taipei City Constituency 3 on behalf of the New Party in the 2012 Taiwanese legislative election but was not nominated. This constituency was won by the KMT affiliated non-district legislator Luo Shu-lei. While Wang was ranked second on the party list, but failed to get a seat as the party failed to achieve 5% of the votes.

==== 2013–2022: KMT, Taipei City Councilor and failed attempt for the Legislative Yuan ====
In 2013, Wang quit the New Party and joined KMT.

In 2014, Wang was reelected as Taipei City Councilor but as a candidate for KMT.

In 2015, Wang attempted to run for Taipei City Constituency 3 in the 2016 Taiwanese legislative election. During pre-selection of the KMT legislators, she was defeated in a three-way race by Chiang Wan-an and Luo Shu-lei. Chiang won the nomination and eventually won the seat in the election.

In 2017, Wang served as deputy chairman of the Kuomintang Cultural Communication Committee and joined the spokesperson group.

In the 2018 Taipei City city council election, she was re-elected with the highest number of votes.

In 2019, Wang participated in the primary election the Legislative Yuan's Taipei City Constituency VII but lost to Fai Hrong-tai, an incumbent legislator.

In 2022, prior to the 2022 Taiwanese local elections, Wang claimed that Hsinchu mayor Lin Chih-chien had plagiarized a research paper for his master's thesis. Lin was investigated and was found to have plagiarized for two master's theses at two different universities. Lin's both master degrees were eventually revoked while Lin withdraw from the elections. Wang was reelected as Taipei City Councilor in the elections.

==== 2022–present: Member of the Legislative Yuan ====
On December 2, Wang was recruited by KMT to run in the by-election for the legislative vacancy in Taipei City Constituency 3 to fill the vacancy left by Chiang's resignation due to his candidacy for Taipei City Mayor. According to the "Local System Law," the vacancy left by Wang Hung-wei did not need to be filled via by-election. Wang initially rejected the nomination but relented after discussing the matter with senior leaders in the party. Wang won the closest victory in the history of this constituency in January 2023. She was sworn in on January 16.

On January 13, 2024, Wang was reelected in the 2024 Taiwanese legislative election with 105,050 votes and a vote share of 52.52%.

== Incidents ==
=== Censored illustration ===
In July 2010, Wang posted a censored illustration from the non-restricted novel "Haruka Nogizaka's Secret" on her blog. This move caused animation fans to leave comments on the blog and the New Party's discussion forum to criticize. Most comments were immediately deleted, and reading permission restrictions were added to the discussion forum on August 9 [18]. On August 18, the New Party discussion forum administrator deleted all questions and comments about this incident. In September 2010, the Animation Upward Promotion Association criticized the behavior of Wang and the administrators of her political party forum at a press conference. It also proposed an amendment to the classification system.

=== Statements undermining Taiwan’s sovereignty ===
In May 2020, Wang during a China Central Television's international programme 海峡两岸, which discusses international affairs and the relationship between China and Taiwan, refer to President of the United States Donald Trump using China's translation of Trump's name (特朗普) instead of Taiwan's translation (川普). She also referred the President of the Republic of China Tsai Ing-wen as leader instead of President. This resulted in netizens criticizing her of undermining Taiwan’s sovereignty.

During the 2025 Taiwanese mass electoral recall campaigns, Wang refer to Taiwan as a city with many natural disasters and was promptly criticized for it. Secretary-General of the Democratic Progressive Party Lin Yu-chang criticized her avoidance of referring Taiwan as her country and its sovereignty. Wang claimed it was a speech error but it was pointed out she was referring to a script when she said Taiwan was a city.

=== False allegation of flooding ===
On May 27, 2022, Wang posted a picture of flooding in Shalu District, Taichung City, on Facebook to criticize Democratic Progressive Party (DPP) legislator Lin Ching-yi for ignoring the disaster in her constituency. At that time, Lin was organizing a delegation with bipartisan delegation to attend the World Health Assembly in Geneva, Switzerland. The picture was found to be a photo of flooding in 2013, and she later corrected the photo, saying it was mistakenly planted.

=== Accusation of abuse of quota ===
On October 18, 2022, Wang held a press conference and accused that Kaohsiung mayor Chen Chi-mai of DPP had used the quota of publicly funded medical students at National Chung-Shan Institute of Science and Technology and failed to serve in rural areas as part of the obligations after completing his studies. Wang accused Chen of wasting the quota and resources of public funds. Chen responded that he had repaid the public funds used for his tuition fees and was released from his obligations as per regulations. The Medical Affairs Department of the Ministry of Health and Welfare of the Republic of China stated that Chen had fully returned the public funds used and was released from his obligations and hence did not break any regulations. It also noted that such compensations of the public funds had since been removed and that publicly funded medical students have to fulfill their obligations or their medical licenses will be suspended and they will not be able to practise medicine.

== Personal life ==
Wang met Tao Yun-cheng in college. After graduation, they both began careers in journalism, married around 1990, and have three children. After Wang entered politics, her husband stopped working in news media to support her political career entirely.

== Election Records ==
year	Number of election terms	Electoral district	Political party to which	Number of votes	Vote rate	Remark
2024	2024 Taiwanese legislative election	Taipei City Constituency III	Kuomintang	105,050	52.52%	
