= Fai Hrong-tai =

Taiwanese statistician and politician

- 費鴻泰
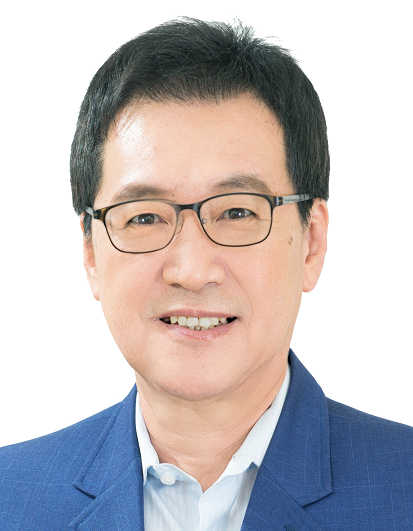
- Official portrait, 2019

Member of the Legislative Yuan
- In office 1 February 2005 – 31 February 2024
- Preceded by: Constituency established
- Succeeded by: Hsu Chiao-hsin
- Constituency: Taipei City I (2005–2008); Taipei City VII (2008–2024)

6th Deputy Speaker of Taipei City Council
- In office 25 December 1998 – 25 December 2002
- Speaker: Wu Pi-chu
- Preceded by: Wu Pi-chu
- Succeeded by: Lee Hsin

Taipei City Councillor
- In office 25 December 1994 – 1 February 2005
- Constituency: Taipei III (Songshan, Xinyi)

Personal details
- Born: July 7, 1954 (age 71) Taipei City, Taiwan
- Party: Kuomintang
- Other political affiliations: New Party (1990–2005)
- Relatives: Fai Hrong-po (brother)
- Education: National Chung Hsing University (BS); Northern Illinois University (MS); University of Kentucky (PhD)

Fai Hrong-tai (Chinese: 費鴻泰; born 7 July 1954), also known by his English name Alex Fai, is a Taiwanese statistician and politician who has been a member of the Legislative Yuan since 2005. He represents Taipei City Constituency VII and is the leader of the Kuomintang caucus in the legislature.

== Early life and education ==
Fai was born in Taipei on July 7, 1954, to Fai Jin-ho and Fai Gi-ing. They were a waishengren family. His father was born in Rizhao, Shandong, and his elder brother graduated from the Republic of China Naval Academy and became president of National Defense University.

After graduating from Cheng Kung Senior High School, Fai received a bachelor's degree in statistics from National Chung Hsing University. He then completed graduate studies in the United States, earning a Master of Science (M.S.) in statistics from Northern Illinois University and his Ph.D. in statistics from the University of Kentucky in 1991. His doctoral dissertation was titled, "Comparison of exact and approximate tests of hypotheses concerning the first stage factor in unbalanced nested designs and the main plot factor in split-plot experiments with missing data".
