= Huang Shan-shan =

Taiwanese politician (born 1969)

Huang Shan-shan MLY
- 黃珊珊
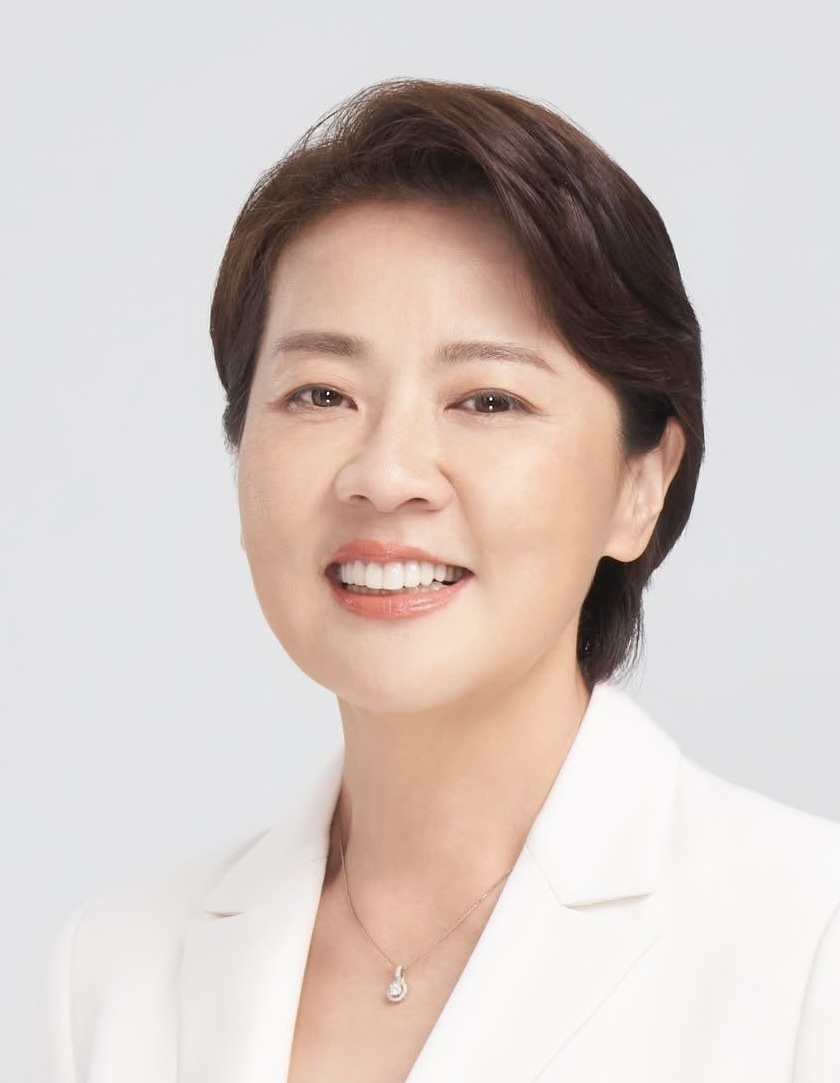
- Official portrait, 2024

Member of the Legislative Yuan
- In office 1 February 2024 – 1 February 2026
- Succeeded by: Hung Yu-shiang
- Constituency: Party-list (TPP)

Deputy Mayor of Taipei
- In office 16 October 2019 – 28 August 2022
- Mayor: Ko Wen-je
- Preceded by: Teng Chia-chi
- Succeeded by: Lee Shu-chuan

Taipei City Councilor
- In office 25 December 1998 – 16 October 2019
- Constituency: Taipei II (Neihu, Nangang)

Personal details
- Born: 18 October 1969 (age 56) Taichung County, Taiwan
- Party: Taiwan People's Party (since 2023); New Party (1998–2001); People First Party (2002–2023)
- Relatives: Huang Shu-kuang (brother)
- Education: National Taiwan University (LLB)
- Profession: Lawyer

Huang Shan-shan (Chinese: 黃珊珊; born 18 October 1969), also known by her English name Vivian Huang, is a Taiwanese politician and lawyer currently affiliated with the Taiwan People's Party.

Huang graduated from National Taiwan University with a Bachelor of Laws (LL.B.). She began her political career as a New Party member of the Taipei City Council in 1998. She left the New Party in 2001, and was a member of the People First Party from 2002 to 2023. In October 2019, she was appointed a deputy mayor of Taipei. Huang's resignation from the deputy mayorship took effect on 28 August 2022, and that year she ran for mayor of Taipei as a political independent, ultimately coming in third.

Huang announced she had joined the Taiwan People's Party (TPP) on 6 April 2023, and said on that day that she was backing Ko Wen-je's bid for the presidency in the 2024 presidential election. Huang was elected to the Legislative Yuan in the 2024 legislative election as the first-ranked candidate on the TPP's proportional representation party list. The TPP nominated Huang to serve as the speaker of the 11th Legislative Yuan. In line with TPP regulations, Huang announced her resignation from the Legislative Yuan in January 2026. Huang announced her retirement from politics in September 2026.

== Personal life ==
Huang's elder brother is Huang Shu-kuang. She has a son.
