= List of by-elections in Taiwan =

This is a list of major by-elections in Taiwan, with the names of the incumbent and victor and their respective parties.

Flip from Pan-Blue to Pan-Green
Flip from Pan-Green to Pan-Blue

== Local by-elections (mayors and magistrates) ==
City / County	Date	Incumbent	Party	Winner	Party	Cause
Kaohsiung	15 August 2020	Han Kuo-yu	Kuomintang	Chen Chi-mai	DPP	Recalled
Keelung	19 February 2007	Hsu Tsai-li	Kuomintang	Chang Tong-rong	Kuomintang	Death
Taitung County	1 April 2006	Wu Chun-li	Independent	Kuang Li-chen	Kuomintang	Resigned over corruption
Yunlin County	6 November 1999	Su Wen-hsiung	Kuomintang	Chang Jung-wei	Independent	Death
Taoyuan County	15 March 1997	Liu Pang-yu	Kuomintang	Annette Lu	DPP	Assassinated
Penghu	8 March 1993	Wang Chien-tung	Kuomintang	Kao Chih-peng	DPP	Death
Hsinchu	23 June 1984	Shih Hsing-chung	Independent	Shih Hsing-chung	Independent	Resigned
Taichung County	16 April 1956	Chen Shui-tan	Kuomintang	Liao Wu-hu	Kuomintang	Death
Taitung County	1 March 1952	Chen Chen-tsung	Kuomintang	Wu Chin-yu	Kuomintang	Death
Miaoli County	29 July 1951	Liu Ting-kuo	Kuomintang	Lai Shun-sheng	Kuomintang	Election annulled after unduly elected

== Legislative Yuan by-elections ==
Constituency	Date	Incumbent	Party	Winner	Party	Cause
Nantou II	4 March 2023	Hsu Shu-hua	Kuomintang	Frida Tsai	DPP	Elected as Magistrate of Nantou County
Taipei III	8 January 2023	Chiang Wan-an	Kuomintang	Wang Hung-wei	Kuomintang	Resigned to run in election
Taichung II	9 January 2022	Chen Po-wei	Statebuilding	Lin Ching-yi	DPP	Recalled
Changhua I	16 March 2019	Wang Huei-mei	Kuomintang	Ko Cheng-fang	Kuomintang	Elected as Magistrate of Changhua County
New Taipei III	16 March 2019	Gao Jyh-peng	DPP	Yu Tian	DPP	Disqualified after conviction
Kinmen	16 March 2019	Yang Cheng-wu	Kuomintang	Chen Yu-chen	Independent	Elected as Magistrate of Kinmen County
Tainan II	16 March 2019	Huang Wei-che	DPP	Kuo Kuo-wen	DPP	Elected as Mayor of Tainan
Taichung V	27 January 2019	Lu Shiow-yen	Kuomintang	Shen Chih-hwei	Kuomintang	Resigned to run in election
Taipei II	27 January 2019	Pasuya Yao	DPP	Ho Chih-wei	DPP	Resigned to run in election
Changhua IV	7 February 2015	Wei Ming-ku	DPP	Chen Su-yueh	DPP	Resigned to run in election
Miaoli II	7 February 2015	Hsu Yao-chang	Kuomintang	Hsu Chih-jung	Kuomintang	Elected as Magistrate of Miaoli County
Nantou II	7 February 2015	Lin Ming-chen	Kuomintang	Hsu Shu-hua	Kuomintang	Elected as Magistrate of Nantou County
Pingtung III	7 February 2015	Pan Men-an	DPP	Chuang Jui-hsiung	DPP	Elected as Magistrate of Pingtung County
Taichung VI	7 February 2015	Lin Chia-lung	DPP	Huang Kuo-shu	DPP	Resigned to run in election
Taichung II	26 January 2013	Yen Ching-piao	NPSU	Yen Kuan-heng	Kuomintang	Disqualified after conviction
Kaohsiung IV	5 March 2011	Chen Chi-yu	DPP	Lin Tai-hua	DPP	Became Deputy Mayor of Kaohsiung
Tainan IV	5 March 2011	Lai Ching-te	DPP	Hsu Tain-tsair	DPP	Elected as Mayor of Tainan
Chiayi County II	27 February 2010	Helen Chang	DPP	Chen Ming-wen	DPP	Resigned to run in election
Hsinchu County	27 February 2010	Chiu Ching-chun	Kuomintang	Perng Shaw-jiin	DPP	Elected as Magistrate of Hsinchu County
Hualien County	27 February 2010	Fu Kun-chi	Kuomintang/PFP	Wang Ting-son	Kuomintang	Elected as Magistrate of Hualien County
Taoyuan III	27 February 2010	John Wu	Kuomintang	Huang Jen-shu	DPP	Elected as Magistrate of Taoyuan County
Taichung County III	9 January 2010	Chiang Lien-fu	Kuomintang	Tony Jian	DPP	Election annulled over fraud
Taitung County	9 January 2010	Justin Huang	Kuomintang	Lie Kuen-cheng	DPP	Resigned to run in election
Taoyuan II	9 January 2010	Liao Cheng-ching	Kuomintang	Kuo Jung-tsung	DPP	Election annulled over fraud
Nantou I	5 December 2009	Wu Den-yih	Kuomintang	Ma Wen-chun	Kuomintang	Became Premier of the Republic of China
Yunlin II	26 September 2009	Chang Sho-wen	Kuomintang	Liu Chien-kuo	DPP	Election annulled over fraud
Taipei VI	28 March 2009	Diane Lee	Kuomintang	Chiang Nai-shin	Kuomintang	Resigned over dual citizenship
Miaoli I	14 March 2009	Lee Yi-ting	Kuomintang	Kang Shih-ju	Independent	Election annulled over fraud
Chiayi	11 March 2006	Huang Min-hui	Kuomintang	Chiang Yi-hsiung	Kuomintang	Elected as Mayor of Chiayi
Hualien County	12 March 1995	Hsieh Shen-shan	Kuomintang	Chang Wea	Independent	Became Minister of Council of Labor; Affairs of the Republic of China
