= Legislative Yuan constituencies in Taichung City =

Taichung City electoral constituencies (Chinese: 臺中市選舉區) consist of 8 single-member constituencies, each represented by a member of the Republic of China Legislative Yuan.

== Current constituencies ==
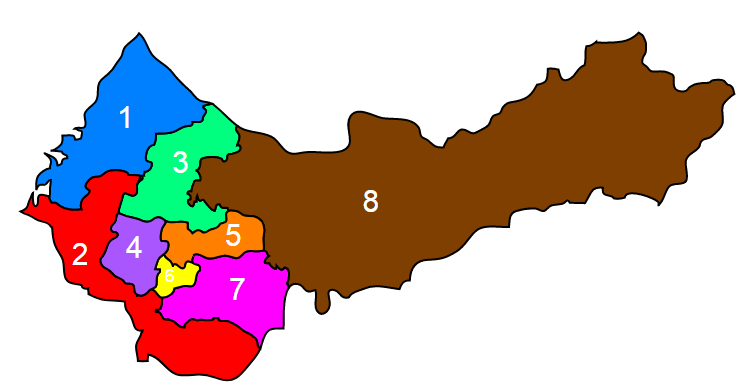
Map of Taichung's legislative districts

Some constituencies were renamed in 2010 as a result of the merger of Taichung County. Some adjustments were made in 2019.

- Taichung City Constituency 1: Dajia, Daan, Waipu, Qingshui, Wuqi
- Taichung City Constituency 2: (Note: Also included two villages of Dali prior to 2019) Shalu, Longjing, Dadu, Wuri, Wufeng
- Taichung City Constituency 3: Houli, Shengang, Daya, Tanzi
- Taichung City Constituency 4: (Note: Formerly Taichung City Constituency I) Xitun, Nantun
- Taichung City Constituency 5: (Note: Formerly Taichung City Constituency II) Beitun, North
- Taichung City Constituency 6: (Note: Formerly Taichung City Constituency III) South, East, Central, West
- Taichung City Constituency 7: (Note: Formerly Taichung County Constituency IV) Taiping, Dali (Note: Two districts in Constituency II prior to 2019)
- Taichung City Constituency 8: (Note: Formerly Taichung County Constituency V) Fengyuan, Shigang, Dongshi, Xinshe, Heping

== Legislators ==
Kuomintang Democratic Progressive Party Non-Partisan Solidarity Union New Power Party Taiwan Statebuilding Party Independent

Election	I	II	III	IV	V	VI	VII	VIII
2008 7th	Liu Chuan-chung	Yen Ching-piao	Yang Chiung-ying	Tsai Chin-lung	Lu Shiow-yen (2008-2018)^{1}	Daniel Huang	Chiang Lien-fu	Shyu Jong-shyong
2012 8th	Tsai Chi-chang	Yen Ching-piao	Yang Chiung-ying	Tsai Chin-lung	Lu Shiow-yen (2008-2018)^{1}	Lin Chia-lung (2012-2014)^{2}	Ho Hsin-chun	Johnny Chiang
2014	Tsai Chi-chang	Yen Ching-piao	Yang Chiung-ying	Tsai Chin-lung	Lu Shiow-yen (2008-2018)^{1}	Huang Kuo-shu^{3}	Ho Hsin-chun	Johnny Chiang
2016 9th	Tsai Chi-chang	Yen Kuan-heng	Hung Tzu-yung	Chang Liao Wan-chien	Lu Shiow-yen (2008-2018)^{1}	Huang Kuo-shu^{3}	Ho Hsin-chun	Johnny Chiang
2019	Tsai Chi-chang	Yen Kuan-heng	Hung Tzu-yung	Chang Liao Wan-chien	Shen Chih-hwei	Huang Kuo-shu^{3}	Ho Hsin-chun	Johnny Chiang
2020 10th	Tsai Chi-chang	Chen Po-wei (recalled)	Yang Chiung-ying	Chang Liao Wan-chien	Chuang Ching-cheng	Huang Kuo-shu^{3}	Ho Hsin-chun	Johnny Chiang
2022	Tsai Chi-chang	Lin Ching-yi	Yang Chiung-ying	Chang Liao Wan-chien	Chuang Ching-cheng	Huang Kuo-shu^{3}	Ho Hsin-chun	Johnny Chiang
2024 11th	Tsai Chi-chang	Yen Kuan-heng	Yang Chiung-ying	Liao Wei-hsiang	Huang Chien-hao	Lo Ting-wei	Ho Hsin-chun	Johnny Chiang

Lu Shiow-yen resigned in 2018 to focus on her Taichung mayoral election campaign.

Lin Chia-lung resigned in 2014 to focus on his Taichung mayoral election campaign.

Huang Kuo-shu resigned from the DDP in October 2021 after reports surfaced that he worked as a Kuomintang informant in his 20s.
