= Taichung City Constituency 2 =

Constituency of the Legislative Yuan of Taiwan

- Single-member constituency for the Legislative Yuan
- District(s): Shalu, Longjing, Dadu, Wuri, Wufeng, 2 villages in Dali (until 2020)
- Electorate: 302,779 (2024 election)

Current constituency
- Created: 2008 (as Taichung County Constituency 2); 2010 (current name); 2020 (current boundaries)
- Party: KMT
- Member: Yen Kuan-heng

Taichung City Constituency 2 (Chinese: 臺中市第二選舉區) is one of the 73 regional constituencies represented in the Legislative Yuan, the national legislature of Taiwan. It was created in 2008 (as Taichung County Constituency 2) following a series of constitutional reforms, and elects one legislator, through first-past-the-post voting, to the Legislative Yuan. It has been represented by Yen Kuan-heng of the Kuomintang since 2024.

== Legislators ==
Election	Legislator	Party
2008 - 2013	Yen Ching-piao	Non-Partisan Solidarity Union
2013 - 2020	Yen Kuan-heng	Kuomintang
2020 - 2022	Chen Po-wei	Taiwan Statebuilding Party
2022 - 2024	Lin Ching-yi	Democratic Progressive Party
2024	Yen Kuan-heng	Kuomintang

== Election results ==

=== 2008 (Note: Named Taichung County Constituency 2, boundaries unchanged) ===
2008 Taiwanese legislative election: Taichung County 2
Candidate	Party	Votes	%
Yen Ching-piao	Non-Partisan Solidarity Union	83,349	59.94
Liu Jui-lung	Democratic Progressive Party	41,093	29.55
Li Shun-liang	Independent	14,611	10.51
Total		139,053	100.00
Valid votes		139,053	97.15
Invalid/blank votes		4,079	2.85
Total votes		143,132	100.00
Registered voters/turnout		253,890	56.38
Majority		42,256	30.39
Non-Partisan Solidarity Union win (new seat)			

=== 2012 ===
* denotes the incumbent legislator

2012 Taiwanese legislative election: Taichung 2
Candidate	Party	Votes	%	+/–
Yen Ching-piao	Non-Partisan Solidarity Union	118,585	59.80	▼0.14
Li Shun-liang	Democratic Progressive Party	79,730	40.20	▲10.65
Total		198,315	100.00	–
Valid votes		198,315	96.67	
Invalid/blank votes		6,839	3.33	
Total votes		205,154	100.00	
Registered voters/turnout		270,338	75.89	
Non-Partisan Solidarity Union hold				

=== 2013 by-election ===
Called due to incumbent legislator Yen Ching-piao being convicted of corruption.

2013 Taichung by-election: Taichung 2
Candidate	Party	Votes	%	+/–
Yen Kuan-heng	Kuomintang	66,457	49.95	NEW
Chen Shih-kai	Democratic Progressive Party	65,319	49.09	▲8.89
Yu Sih-jia	Independent (Note: Originally ran under All People's Party banner, but the party withdrew their support on 8 january 2013)	1,283	0.96	NEW
Total		133,059	100.00	–
Kuomintang gain from Non-Partisan Solidarity Union				

=== 2016 ===
* denotes the incumbent legislator

2016 Taiwanese legislative election: Taichung 2
Candidate	Party	Votes	%	+/–
Yen Kuan-heng*	Kuomintang	93,495	46.65	▼3.30
Chen Shih-kai	Democratic Progressive Party	87,596	43.71	▼5.38
Chi Kuo-tung	Independent	17,938	8.95	NEW
Chung Wen-lung	Independent	1,370	0.68	NEW
Total		200,399	100.00	–
Valid votes		200,399	98.24	
Invalid/blank votes		3,598	1.76	
Total votes		203,997	100.00	
Registered voters/turnout		288,136	70.80	
Majority		5,899	2.94	
Kuomintang hold				

=== 2020 ===
* denotes the incumbent legislator

2020 Taiwanese legislative election: Taichung 2
Candidate	Party	Votes	%	+/–
Chen Po-wei	Taiwan Statebuilding Party	112,839	51.15	NEW
Yen Kuan-heng*	Kuomintang	107,766	48.85	▲2.20
Total		220,605	100.00	–
Valid votes		220,605	98.16	
Invalid/blank votes		4,127	1.84	
Total votes		224,732	100.00	
Registered voters/turnout		291,122	77.20	
Majority		5,073	2.3	
Taiwan Statebuilding Party gain from Kuomintang				

=== 2022 by-election ===
Called due to a successful recall of incumbent legislator Chen Po-wei. This was the first time a legislator lost office due to a recall.

2022 Taichung by-election: Taichung 2
Candidate	Party	Votes	%	+/–
Lin Ching-yi	Democratic Progressive Party	88,752	51.83	NEW
Yen Kuan-heng	Kuomintang	80,912	47.25	▼1.60
Lin Chin-lien	Independent	633	0.37	NEW
Li Sheng-han	Independent	617	0.36	NEW
Chang Chiung-chun	Taiwan Stock Party	337	0.20	NEW
Total		171,251	100.00	–
Valid votes		171,251	99.31	
Invalid/blank votes		1,195	0.69	
Total votes		172,446	100.00	
Registered voters/turnout		295,989	58.26	
Majority		7,840	4.58	
Democratic Progressive Party gain from Taiwan Statebuilding Party				

=== 2024 ===
* denotes the incumbent legislator

2024 Taiwanese legislative election: Taichung 2
Candidate	Party	Votes	%	+/–
Yen Kuan-heng	Kuomintang	118,962	53.18	▲5.93
Lin Ching-yi*	Democratic Progressive Party	96,151	42.99	▼8.84
Hong Li-hua	Judicial justice party	6,331	2.83	NEW
Chi Ming-hsiu	Independent	2,232	1.00	NEW
Total		223,676	100.00	–
Valid votes		223,676	98.05	
Invalid/blank votes		4,456	1.95	
Total votes		228,132	100.00	
Registered voters/turnout		302,779	75.35	
Majority		22,811	10.19	
Kuomintang gain from Democratic Progressive Party				
