= Chen Yen-po =

Deputy Transport Minister of Taiwan since 2020

- 陳彥伯
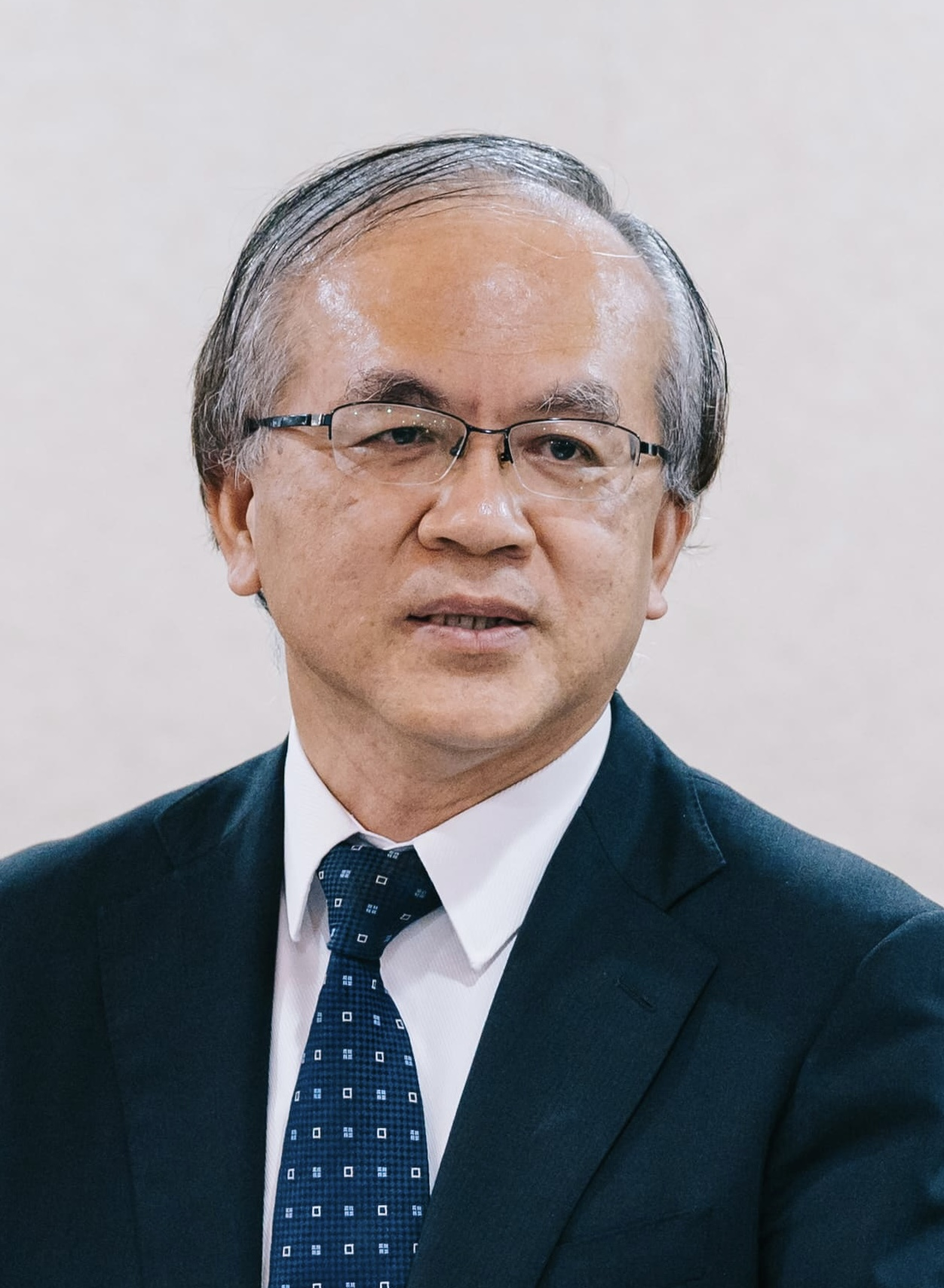
- Official portrait, 2024

Acting Minister of Transportation and Communication
- In office 20 August 2024 – 2 September 2024
- Prime Minister: Cho Jung-tai
- Preceded by: Li Meng-yen
- Succeeded by: Chen Shih-kai

Political Deputy Minister of Transportation and Communication
- Incumbent
- Assumed office 20 May 2020
- Minister: Lin Chia-lung; Wang Kwo-tsai; Li Meng-yen; Himself (acting); Chen Shih-kai
Other offices
Deputy Commander of the Central Epidemic Command Center
During COVID-19; 19 July 2022 – 1 May 2023 Serving with Chen Chern-chyi
| Commander | Victor Wang |
| Preceded by | Chen Tsung-yen |
| Succeeded by | Position abolished |
7th Director-General of the Highway Bureau
In office August 2016 – 19 May 2020
| Minister | Hochen Tan; Wu Hong-mo |
| Preceded by | Chao Hsin-hua |
| Succeeded by | Hsu Cheng-chang (acting) |

Personal details
- Citizenship: Taiwanese
- Party: Independent
- Education: National Cheng Kung University (BS, MS)

Chen Yen-po (Chinese: 陳彥伯) is a Taiwanese politician who has served as the deputy minister of Transportation and Communications since 2024 and acts as minister from August to September 2024.

== Political career ==
Chen began his career at the Ministry of Transportation and Communication (MOTC) since 1998.

In May 2020, he was appointed political deputy transport minister. He also served as the deputy commander of the Central Epidemic Command Center during the COVID-19 pandemic.

In August 2024, he was appointed acting transport minister after the resignation of Li Meng-yen.
