= Chi Wen-jong =

Taiwanese engineer

- 祁文中
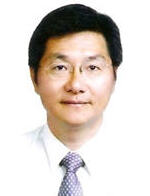

Administrative Deputy Minister of Transportation and Communications of the Republic of China
- In office 7 October 2016 – 16 January 2024
- Minister: Hochen Tan; Wu Hong-mo; Lin Chia-lung; Wang Kwo-tsai
- Deputy: Chen Yen-po; Wang Kwo-tsai

Director-General of Institute of Transportation of the Republic of China
- In office 22 August 2016 – 24 October 2016
- Preceded by: Lin Shinn-der
- Succeeded by: Wu Yuh-jen

Personal details
- Education: National Chiao Tung University (BS, MS)

Chi Wen-jong (Chinese: 祁文中; pinyin: Qí Wénzhōng) is a Taiwanese engineer.

== Early life and education ==
Chi's father was a lighthouse keeper stationed at the Kaohsiung Lighthouse.

Chi studied engineering at National Chiao Tung University, where he earned a bachelor's degree in transportation engineering in 1981 and a master's degree in traffic engineering in 1984.

== Career ==
Chi worked as the chief engineer of the Taipei City Traffic Engineering Office between 1997 and 1999, then served as director of the Taiwan Area National Freeway Bureau, a division of the Ministry of Transportation and Communications until 2005, when he was named deputy chief engineer within the same department. From 2006 to 2008, Chi worked for the Taichung City Government, within its Transportation Bureau.

Chi returned to the Ministry of Transportation and Communications in 2008 as the director of the Department of Railways and Highways. By 2010, he was named the director of the Department of Aviation and Navigation. He remained head of Aviation and Navigation through 2012. By 2013, Chi was appointed Maritime and Port Bureau director-general. From this position, Chi commented on the practice of ship inspection as the Ministry of Transportation and Communications considered increasing the frequency of such inspections in 2014. The Ocean Researcher V sunk in October of that year, and Chi was called upon to discuss details of the shipwreck and subsequent investigation. In October 2014, Chi commented on the perceived national security threat of the Hua Yun No. 12, a Chinese-owned, Hong Kong-operated ship registered in Cambodia, as the vessel traveled near Taiwan. In May 2016, Chi helped make travel arrangements for Nien Chi-cheng to visit Beiding Island Lighthouse on Kinmen, where Nien's father, a lighthouse keeper, was once stationed. As leader of the Maritime and Port Bureau, Chi also supported the designation of Dongyong Lighthouse as a national historical landmark, a status it had first gained in 1988.

Following the election of Tsai Ing-wen as president, Chi was appointed administrative deputy minister of transportation and communications. In this role, Chi announced in December 2016 an intention for the government to focus on instances of drunk driving by young adults. That same month, Chi was questioned about construction delays on the Taichung Metropolitan Area Elevated Railway Project, as well as fines levied on Hua Sheng Engineering Construction Company, which was responsible for a portion of the project. Throughout 2017, Chi commented on several issues, including a protest action organized by the National Motorcycles Management Industry Advancement Association, toll discounts in place for National Day, the results of an investigation into a road incident involving a bus, and a misleading report issued by the Central Weather Bureau. In January 2018, Chi was appointed to a task force to promote the New Southbound Policy. Additionally, he replaced Tseng Dar-jen, who had resigned as Taoyuan International Airport Corporation chairman, on a temporary basis in October, serving to the end of 2018. That same year, Chi commented on the regulations mandating car inspections, legal campsites, and participated in discussions about the Tourism Bureau’s winter domestic travel subsidy program. Following an outbreak of African swine fever in 2018, Chi explained how Taiwan's airlines dispose of leftovers from in-flight meals. Later that year, Chi discussed amendments to the Regulations Governing Business Income Tax Exemption for Foreign Countries, Mainland China, Hong Kong or Macau Profit-Seeking Enterprises Conducting Goods Storage and/or Simple Processing Operations in Free Trade Zones. In 2019, Chi discussed proposed amendments to the Act for the Development of Tourism. He later disclosed further penalties against Far Eastern Air Transport, an airline that cancelled several flights without prior notice in May 2019 to manage flight hours control in effect against the airline since March 2017.

As deputy transportation and communications minister, Chi has signed reciprocal drivers license agreements with Wyoming and New Mexico, participated in inspections at Taiwan Railways Administration offices, and Taoyuan International Airport, and attended a number of public functions, such as the opening of a traffic safety park for children at Youth Park in Taipei in 2018, and the 60th anniversary celebration of Japan Airlines service to Taipei Songshan Airport in 2019.
