= 2022 Taichung by-election =

2022 Taichung legislative by-election
← 2020	9 January 2022	2024 →

Taichung City Constituency II of the Legislative Yuan
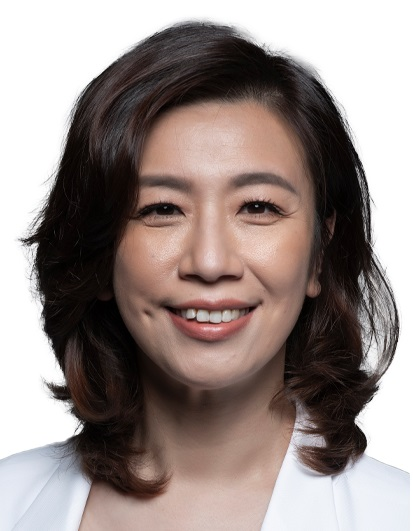

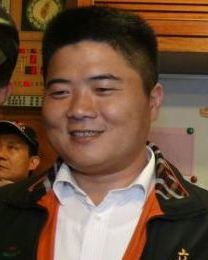
	Majority party	Minority party
Candidate	Lin Ching-yi	Yen Kuan-heng
Party	DPP	Kuomintang
Popular vote	88,752	80,912
Percentage	51.83%	47.25%
Legislator before election
Chen Po-wei (recalled)
Statebuilding
Elected Legislator
Lin Ching-yi
DPP

A by-election was held on 9 January 2022 in Taichung to elect one member of the Legislative Yuan for the Taichung City Constituency II (Taichung 2) for the remaining term until 2024. Democratic Progressive Party legislator Lin Ching-yi won the by-election for Taichung 2 to replace Chen Po-wei, who was recalled on 23 October 2021.

== Background ==
In the 2020 Taiwanese legislative election, Chen Po-wei became the first member of the Taiwan Statebuilding Party to be elected to the Legislative Yuan. He narrowly defeated the incumbent Kuomintang legislator Yen Kuan-heng by 2.30 percentage points. Shortly after Chen was sworn in, some pan-Blue politicians (most notably the New Party in June 2020) called for Chen to be recalled, with media sources frequently portraying it revenge for the recall of former Kaohsiung mayor Han Kuo-yu.

On 8 February 2021, a recall effort led by Yang Wen-yuan officially proposed a recall motion against Chen. Under Article 76 of the Civil Servants Election and Recall Act, a proposal passes into the second stage with the number of proposers totaling at least 1% of the electorate. On 5 March 2021, the Central Election Commission announced that the proposal threshold of 2,912 proposers had been met with 3,744 valid proposers. The second stage, which requires joint signers of the proposal to exceed 10% of the electorate (29,113 signatures), was met with 36,073 valid signatures; the recall vote was formally established on 2 July 2021. The CEC originally planned for a recall vote on 28 August 2021, but postponed it to 23 October 2021 due to the COVID-19 pandemic. Chen was successfully recalled, with 77,899 votes in favor, exceeding both the required 25% threshold of 73,744 votes and the 73,433 votes against. Chen became the first legislator to have been recalled. On 28 October 2021, the CEC announced that the by-election to replace Chen would be held on 9 January 2022. Candidate registrations were open from 15 to 19 November 2021.

== Candidates ==
- Kuomintang called in former legislator Yen Kuan-heng to contest the seat. Yen held the seat from 2013, when he won a by-election to replace his father Yen Ching-piao, until 2020, when he lost to Chen Po-wei.
- Democratic Progressive Party called in former legislator Lin Ching-yi to contest the seat. Lin also received the backing of the Taiwan Statebuilding Party.

== Election ==
A total of 258 polling stations were open from 8:00 to 16:00 on 9 January 2022. A number of people set up or used cameras near polling stations, in contravention of election law. Yen made a concession speech at 17:50. Political scientist Shen Yu-chung attributed Lin's win to the Democratic Progressive Party's past successes in the 2020 presidential and legislative elections, stating that most voters cast ballots based on party affiliation instead of local issues. Shen believed that the DPP supported Lin's campaign more directly then the Kuomintang supported Yen Kuan-heng. Instead, the KMT utilized the Yen family's local political influence.

== Results ==
The election was won by Lin with 51.83% of votes, retaining the seat for the Pan-Green Coalition.

Candidate	Party	Votes	%
Lin Ching-yi	Democratic Progressive Party	88,752	51.83
Yen Kuan-heng	Kuomintang	80,912	47.25
Lin Chin-lien	Independent	633	0.37
Li Sheng-han	Independent	617	0.36
Chang Chiung-chun	Taiwan Stock Party	337	0.20
Total		171,251	100.00
Valid votes		171,251	99.31
Invalid/blank votes		1,195	0.69
Total votes		172,446	100.00
Registered voters/turnout		295,985	58.26
