= Julia Hsieh =

Spokesperson of the Executive Yuan since 2024

Julia Hsieh Hsieh Tzu-han
- 謝子涵
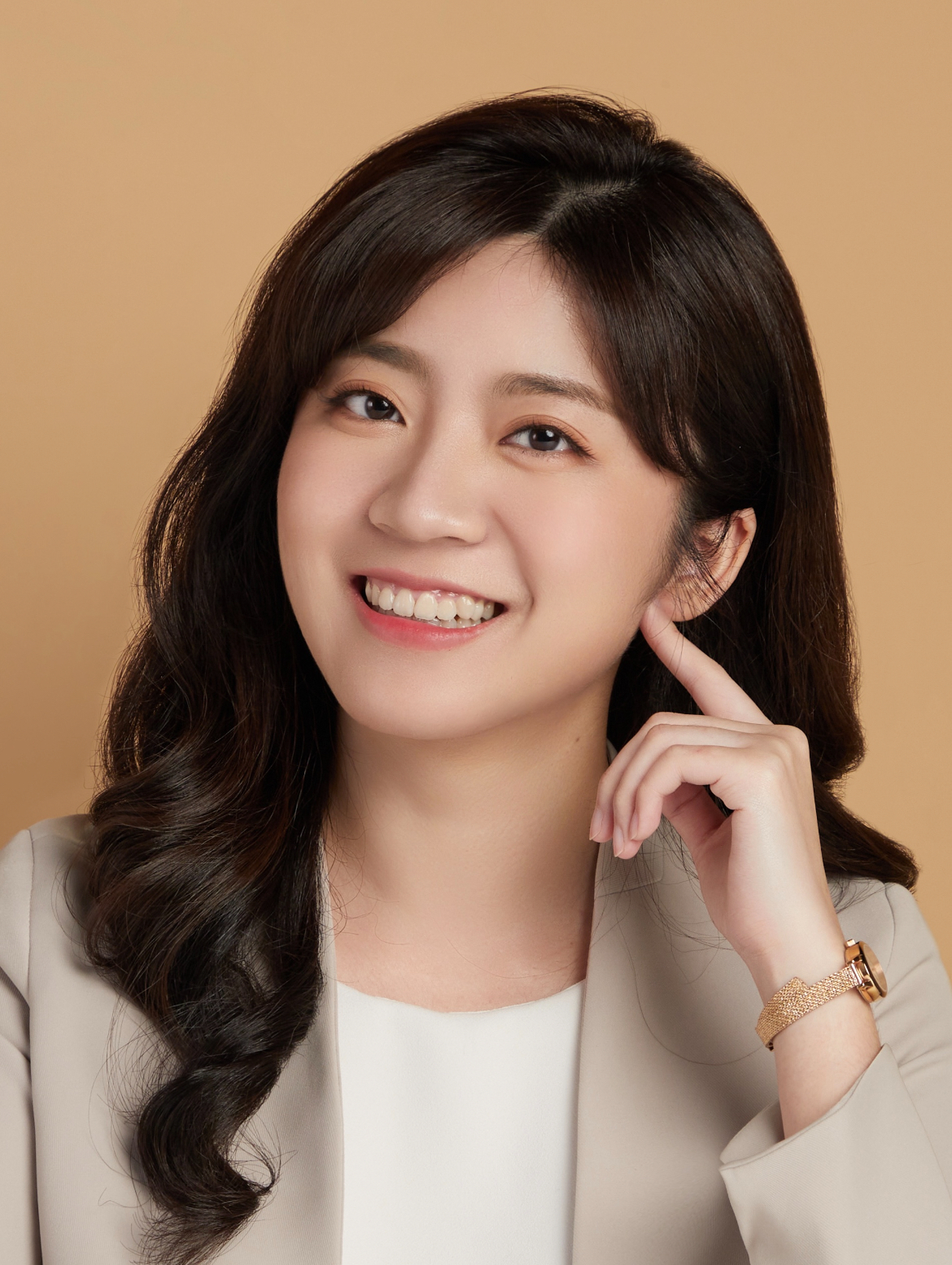
- Official portrait, 2022

Acting Spokesperson of the Executive Yuan
- In office 2 September 2024 – 12 September 2024
- Prime Minister: Cho Jung-tai
- Preceded by: Chen Shih-kai
- Succeeded by: Michelle Lee

Deputy Spokesperson of the Executive Yuan
- Incumbent
- Assumed office 20 May 2024
- Spokesperson: Chen Shih-kai; Herself (acting)

Personal details
- Born: October 29, 1991 (age 34) Dongshi District, Taichung County, Taiwan
- Party: Democratic Progressive Party
- Education: Fu Jen Catholic University (BA); National Chung Hsing University (MA)

Hsieh Tzu-han (Chinese: 謝子涵; born 29 October 1991), also known by her English name Julia Hsieh, is a Taiwanese politician who served as the acting Spokesperson of the Executive Yuan since 2024.

== Education ==
After attending National Fengshan Senior High School, Hsieh graduated from Fu Jen Catholic University with a bachelor's degree in literature and the Japanese language with a minor in diplomacy and international affairs. She then earned a master's degree in international relations from National Chung Hsing University.

== Political career ==
Hsieh began her political career in 2022 as the spokesperson for the Democratic Progressive Party (DPP).

In 2023, she was nominated to run for legislator in Taichung City's third constituency, but she was defeated by the incumbent legislator, Yang Chiung-ying of the Kuomintang.

On 20 May 2024, following the DPP's victory in the presidential election, she was appointed to the Cho cabinet as the Executive Yuan's deputy spokesperson. In August of the same year, Chen Shih-kai, who had been the spokesperson, resigned and was appointed Minister of Transportation and Communications. Hsieh then assumed the role of acting spokesperson until Michelle Lee was appointed as spokesperson on 12 September 2024.
