= Fan Chih-ku =

Taiwanese engineer and politician

- 范植谷

Administrative Deputy Minister of Transportation and Communications of the Republic of China
- In office 2013–2016
- Minister: Yeh Kuang-shih; Chen Jian-yu (acting); Chen Jian-yu; Hochen Tan
- Preceded by: Hsu Chun-yat
- Succeeded by: Chi Wen-jong

Deputy Director-General of Taiwan Railways Administration of Ministry of Transportation and Communications
- In office 2006–2013

Personal details
- Born: December 1954 (age 71)
- Education: National Cheng Kung University (BS); Asian Institute of Technology (MS); National Chiao Tung University (PhD)

Fan Chih-ku or Frank Fan (Chinese: 范植谷; pinyin: Fàn Zhígǔ) is a Taiwanese engineer and politician. He was the Administrative Deputy Minister of the Ministry of Transportation and Communications of the Republic of China since 2013. He also serves as the Director-General of the Taiwan Railways Administration.

== Education ==
Fan obtained his bachelor's degree in transportation management from National Cheng Kung University in 1978, master's degree in geotechnical and transportation engineering from Asian Institute of Technology in Thailand in 1985 and earned his Ph.D. in transportation technology and management from National Chiao Tung University in 2004.
