= Chen Shih-kai =

Transport Minister of Taiwan since 2024

- 陳世凱
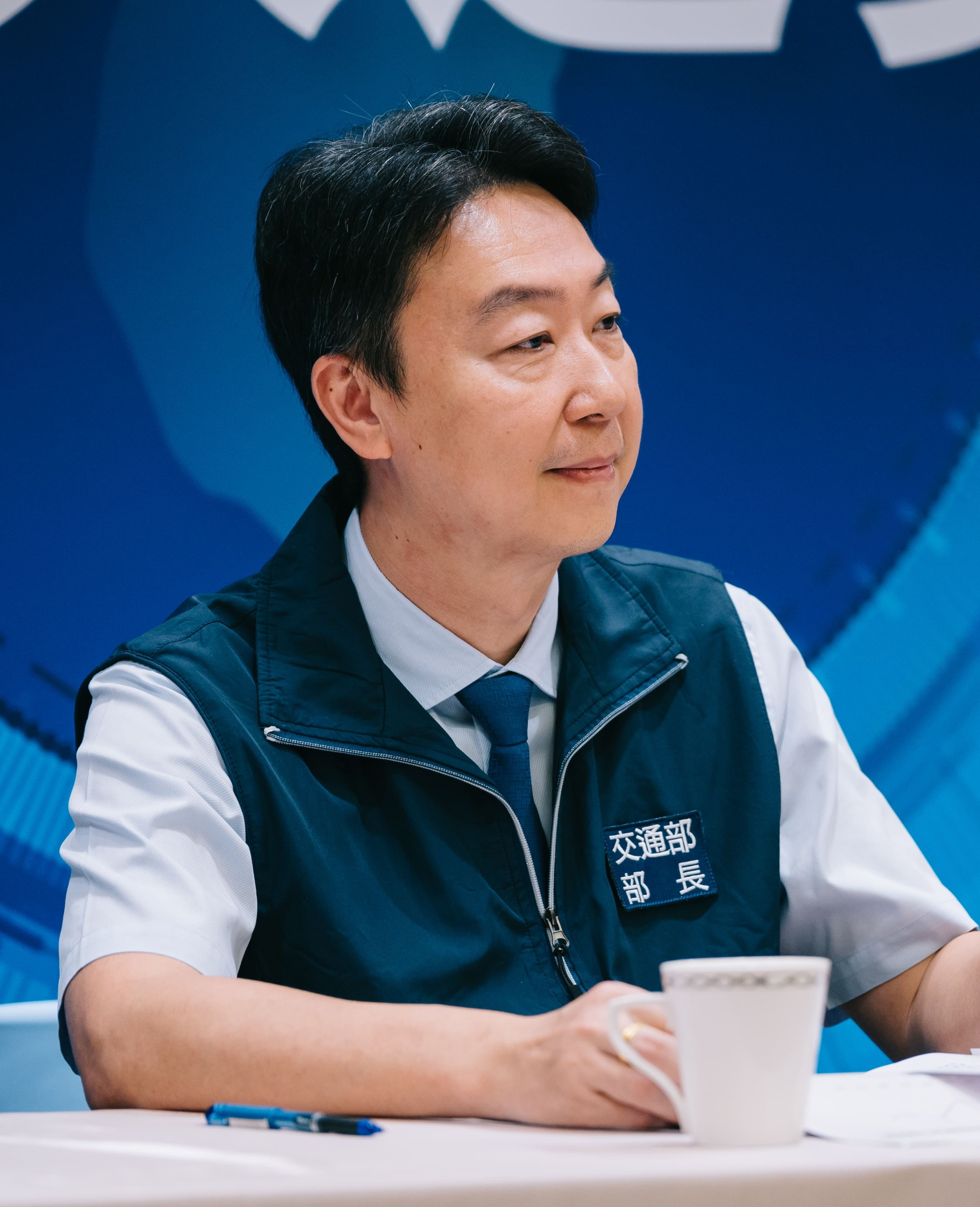
- Chen in 2024

30th Minister of Transportation and Communication
- Incumbent
- Assumed office 2 September 2024
- Prime Minister: Cho Jung-tai
- Preceded by: Chen Yen-po (acting)

11th Spokesperson of the Executive Yuan
- In office 20 May 2024 – 2 September 2024
- Prime Minister: Cho Jung-tai
- Deputy: Julia Hsieh
- Preceded by: Lin Tze-luen
- Succeeded by: Julia Hsieh

Taichung City Councilor
- In office 25 December 2010 – 25 December 2022
- Constituency: 3rd (Longjing–Dadu–Wuri)

Personal details
- Born: 12 May 1977 (age 49) Hsinchu, Taiwan
- Party: Democratic Progressive Party
- Education: Tunghai University (BA); National Taipei University of Technology (MBA)

Chen Shih-kai (Chinese: 陳世凱; pinyin: Chén Shìkǎi; born 12 May 1977) is a Taiwanese politician who has served as Minister of Transportation and Communication since 2024.

== Early life and education ==
Chen was born in Hsinchu, Taiwan, on May 12, 1977. He graduated from Tunghai University with a bachelor's degree in political science in 2002 and earned a Master of Business Administration (M.B.A.) from National Taipei University of Technology in 2022.

== Political career ==
=== Local government and Legislative Yuan campaigns ===
At the time of his nomination as the Democratic Progressive Party candidate for the 2013 Taichung by-election, Chen was serving as a Taichung City Councilor. Fellow Taichung councilor Chang Liao Wan-chien served as Chen's campaign spokesperson. Chen faced Kuomintang candidate Yen Kuan-heng, the son of former officeholder Yen Ching-piao, in the by-election. Chen lost by 1,138 votes, considered a narrow defeat in the Pan-Blue-leaning district. Chen then returned to his position as councilor, before facing Yen again in the 2016 Taiwanese legislative election, retaking his council seat after losing to Yen for a second time.

=== Executive Yuan ===
The Taichung City Football Future Development Association supported Chen's 2023 bid to lead the Chinese Taipei Football Association. Later that year, Chen joined William Lai's presidential campaign as a spokesman. After Lai won the January 2024 Taiwanese presidential election, Chen was appointed the spokesman of the Executive Yuan, led by Cho Jung-tai. On 29 August 2024, Cho announced that Chen would be replacing acting minister of transportation and communications Chen Yen-po, who had assumed the role after Li Meng-yen resigned.
