= 2013 Taichung by-election =

By-election held in Taiwan

2013 Taichung legislative by-election
- 26 January 2013
- Turnout: 48.89%
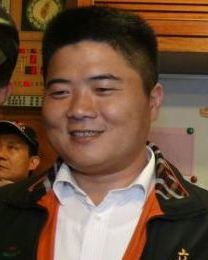

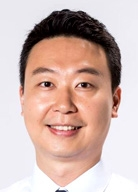
Candidate	Yen Kuan-heng	Chen Shih-kai
Party	KMT	DPP
Popular vote	66,457	65,319
Percentage	49.95%	49.09%
Legislator before election
Yen Ching-piao
NPSU
Elected Legislator
Yen Kuan-heng
KMT

The 2013 Taichung legislative by-election was held in Taiwan on 23 January 2013 for the Taichung City Constituency II after the former legislator Yen Ching-piao was disqualified for corruption.

== Background ==
The Yen family was powerful in Taichung's local politics. Yen Ching-piao was the speaker of Taichung County Council in 1990s, and was first elected to the Legislative Yuan, the parliament of Taiwan, in 2001. Yen, who joined the pan-blue Non-Partisan Solidarity Union in 2004, was re-elected three times in 2004, 2008 and 2012.

Yen has been hit by scandal since he entered politics, and was once jailed in 2001. On 28 November 2012, followed by rulings from lower courts and appeals, Yen was sentenced to jail for 3.5 years by the Supreme Court over grafting, abetting stand-in, and violating ammunition law, and was handed disfranchisement for 3 years. He therefore was disqualified and ceased to be a legislator.

== Candidates ==
A total of three candidates ran in the by-election to succeed Yen, the candidate number was announced on 8 January 2013.

- Yen Kuan-heng: Eldest son of Yen Ching-piao, former member of the National Assembly supported by Non-Partisan Solidarity Union, nominated by Kuomintang on 19 December 2012.
- Yu Sih-jia: Nominated by All People's Party on 21 December 2012, but the party revoked support on 8 January 2013.
- Chen Shih-kai: Taichung City Councilor, nominated by Democratic Progressive Party on 17 December 2012 following a win in the party's opinion poll.

== Result ==
Yen narrowly won the election and succeeded his father with a lead of less than 1%.

2013 Taichung legislative by-election
Party	Candidate	Votes	%	±%
KMT	Yen Kuan-heng	66,457	49.95	
DPP	Chen Shih-kai	65,319	49.09	
Independent	Yu Sih-jia	1,283	0.96	
Total valid votes		133,059	100.00	
Rejected ballots				
Turnout			48.89	
Registered electors				
KMT gain from NPSU		Swing		

Popular vote
Yen	49.95%
Chen	49.09%
Yu	0.96%

== Controversies ==
The by-election was held less than two months after Yen was disqualified, earlier than the average of three months. DPP officials accused the authorities of trying to discourage other candidates to run, while the Central Election Commission officials said they considered holding the election before Lunar New Year holiday such that new legislator can be sworn in at the beginning of the new session. The Yen family was also suspected of bribery during the campaign.
