= Tsao Shou-min =

Taiwanese politician (born 1951)

Tsao Shu-min
- 曹壽民

Member of the Legislative Yuan
- In office 1 February 2005 – 9 July 2007
- Succeeded by: Hwang Liang-hua
- Constituency: Kuomintang party list

Director of the Department of Transportation, Taipei City Government
- In office 12 January 1999 – 31 July 2001
- Appointed by: Ma Ying-jeou
- Preceded by: Hochen Tan
- Succeeded by: Chen Wu-cheng

Personal details
- Born: 18 April 1951 (age 74) Taiwan
- Party: Kuomintang
- Education: National Taiwan University (BS); University of Maryland (MS, PhD)

Tsao Shou-min (Chinese: 曹壽民; born 18 April 1951) is a Taiwanese engineer and politician.

== Education ==
Tsao graduated from National Taiwan University with a bachelor's degree in civil engineering, then completed graduate studies in the United States at the University of Maryland, College Park, where he earned a master's degree in 1983 and his Ph.D. in civil engineering. His doctoral dissertation was titled, "An analysis of zonal transit service".

After returning to Taiwan, Tsao became a professor within the civil engineering department at NTU.

== Political career ==
=== Department of Transportation, Taipei City Government ===
Tsao was the first head of Taipei City Government's Department of Transportation appointed by mayor Ma Ying-jeou. In this role, Tsao discussed the legal classification of scooters, implemented a ban on eating and drinking while riding the Taipei Joint Bus System, and traveled with Ma on a 2001 visit to Hong Kong. In Ma's second mayoral term, Tsao was replaced by Chen Wu-cheng.

=== Legislative Yuan ===
Tsao was elected to the Legislative Yuan in 2004, via the Kuomintang's party list for proportional representation. As a legislator, Tsao commented on operations of the National Space Organization and China Airlines. Tsao resigned from the Legislative Yuan in July 2007, as his leave of absence from National Taiwan University was due to end, and was replaced by Hwang Liang-hua.

== Later career ==
Tsao later served as chair of Sinotech Engineering Consultants Ltd and taught at Feng Chia University.
