= Wang Kwo-tsai =

Taiwanese engineer

- 王國材
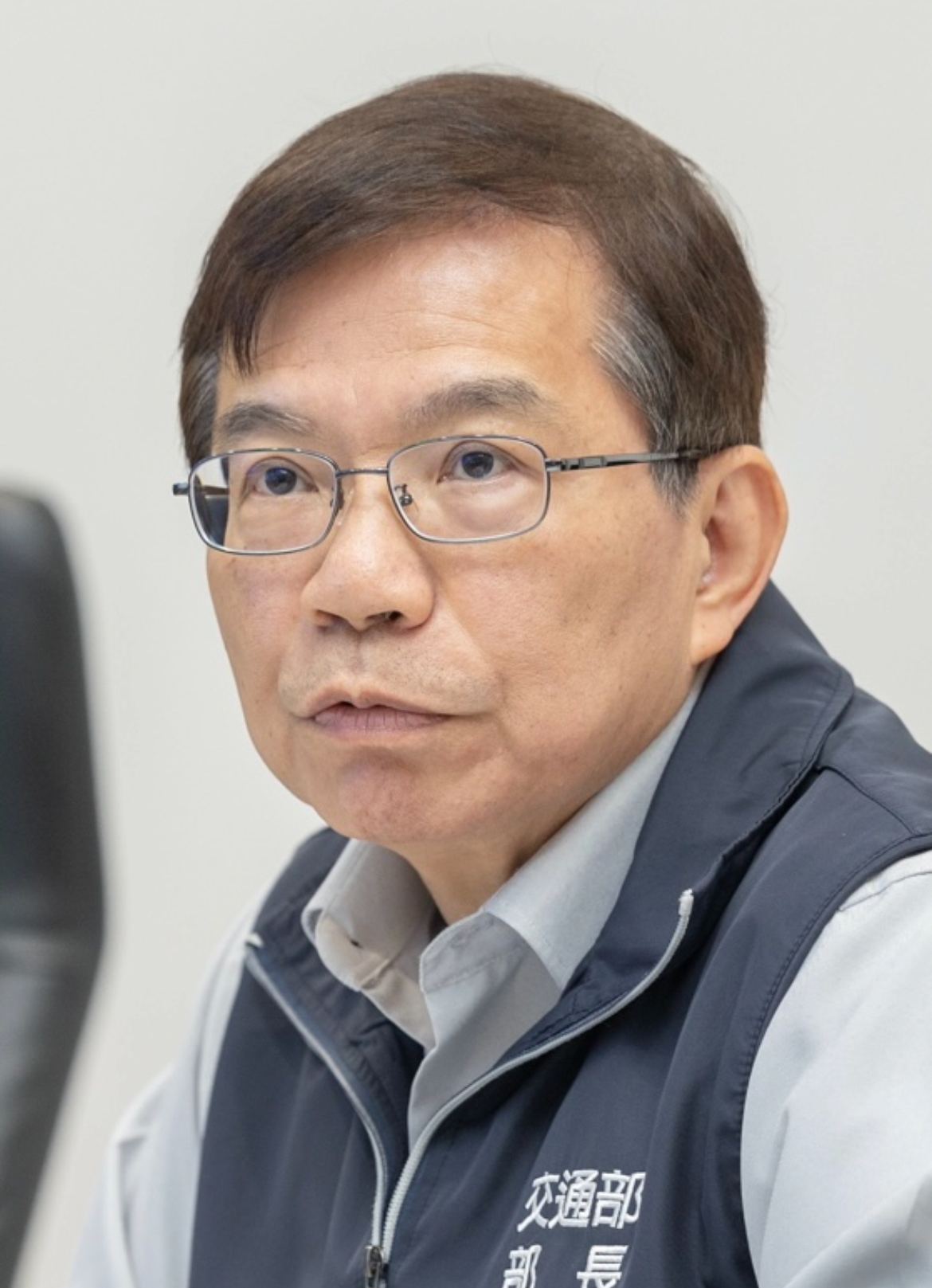
- Wang in 2024

10th Chairman of the Chunghwa Post
- Incumbent
- Assumed office 21 August 2024
- Premier: Cho Jung-tai
- Preceded by: Wu Hong-mo
- Acting; 15 May 2019 – 27 June 2019
- Premier: Su Tseng-chang
- Preceded by: Wei Chien-hong
- Succeeded by: Wu Hong-mo
- Acting; 30 June 2017 – 11 May 2018
- Premier: Lin Chuan; William Lai
- Preceded by: Philip Ong
- Succeeded by: Wei Chien-hong

28th Minister of Transportation and Communications
- In office 20 April 2021 – 20 May 2024
- Premier: Su Tseng-chang; Chen Chien-jen
- Preceded by: Lin Chia-lung
- Succeeded by: Li Meng-yen
- Acting; 2 December 2018 – 13 January 2019
- Premier: Lai Ching-te
- Deputy: Chi Wen-jong (administrative)
- Preceded by: Wu Hong-mo
- Succeeded by: Lin Chia-lung
Additional positions
Political Deputy Minister of Transportation and Communications
In office 20 May 2016 – 19 April 2021
Minister	Hochen Tan; Wu Hong-mo; Lin Chia-lung
Deputy	Fan Chih-ku, Wu Men-feng, Chi Wen-jong (administrative)
Director of Transportation of Kaohsiung
In office 14 February 2007 – 17 February 2013
Mayor	Chen Chu

Personal details
- Born: 1959 (age 66–67)
- Party: Independent
- Education: National Cheng Kung University (BS, MS); National Chiao Tung University (PhD)

Wang Kwo-tsai (traditional Chinese: 王國材; simplified Chinese: 王国材; pinyin: Wáng Guócái; born 1959) is a Taiwanese engineer who served as the Minister of Transportation and Communications from 2021 to 2024. He had also served as the Political Deputy Minister of Transportation and Communications between 2016 and 2021.

== Education ==
Wang graduated from National Cheng Kung University with a bachelor's degree and a master's degree in transportation engineering in 1981 and 1988, respectively. He then earned his Ph.D. in transportation engineering from National Chiao Tung University in 1995. His doctoral dissertation was titled, "A study on the impact of transportation network layouts on urban development patterns" (Chinese: 運輸網路佈置對都市發展型態影響之研究).

== Political career ==
Wang took office as political deputy minister of transportation and communications on 20 May 2016, serving under Hochen Tan. He served as the acting minister between December 2018 to January 2019 as the deputy minister, after the then minister Wu Hong-mo resigned due to the poor result of the ruling party of government on the 2018 Taiwanese local elections.
