= Hocheng Hong =

Taiwanese academic and politician

- 賀陳弘
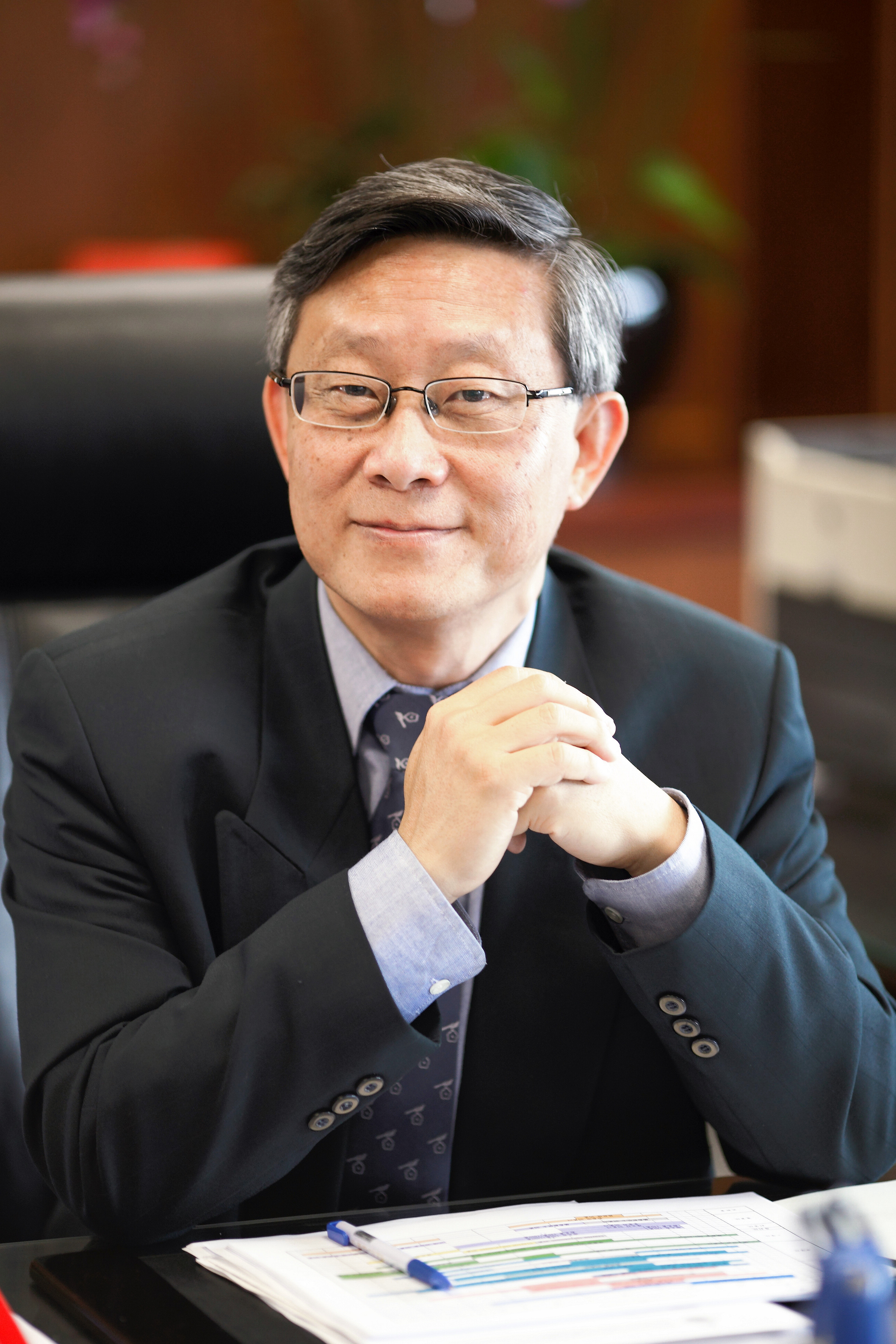

Deputy Minister of Science
- In office February 2012 – 2014
- Minister: Cyrus Chu
- Succeeded by: Lin Yi-bing

Personal details
- Relatives: Hochen Tan (brother)
- Education: National Taiwan University (BS); RWTH Aachen (Diplom); University of California, Berkeley (PhD)

Hocheng Hong (Chinese: 賀陳弘; pinyin: Hèchén Hóng) is a Taiwanese academic and mechanical engineer. He served as the Deputy Minister of the National Science Council of the Executive Yuan from 2012 to 2014 and is the current president of National Tsing Hua University. He is the younger brother of Hochen Tan.

== Education ==
Hong graduated from National Taiwan University with a bachelor's degree in mechanical engineering and earned a diplom in the subject from RWTH Aachen University in Germany. He then went to the United States and earned a Ph.D. in mechanical engineering from the University of California, Berkeley, in 1988. His doctoral dissertation, completed under professor C. K. H. Dharan, was titled, "An analysis of drilling of composite materials".
