= Hwang Liang-hua =

Taiwanese businessman and politician

Hwang Liang-hua (Chinese: 黃良華) is a Taiwanese businessman and politician.

Hwang graduated from Chinese Culture University.

Hwang led the taishang business association in Foshan, and was seated to the Legislative Yuan on 12 July 2007, after the resignation of Tsao Shou-min. As a legislator, Hwang led a group of taishang supportive of Ma Ying-jeou's 2008 presidential campaign, and advocated for a reduction of restrictions on Taiwanese investments in China.
