= Chen Jian-yu =

Taiwanese politician and lawyer

- 陳建宇

Minister of Transportation and Communications of the Republic of China
- In office 9 January 2015 – 20 May 2016
- Deputy: Fan Chih-ku
- Preceded by: Yeh Kuang-shih
- Succeeded by: Hochen Tan

Political Deputy Minister of Transportation and Communications of the Republic of China
- In office 8 March 2014 – 9 January 2015
- Minister: Yeh Kuang-shih
- Deputy: Fan Chih-ku
- Preceded by: Chen Chwen-jing

Administrative Deputy Minister of Transportation and Communications of the Republic of China
- In office 2011 – 8 March 2014
- Minister: Yeh Kuang-shih

Personal details
- Education: Soochow University (LLB)

Chen Jian-yu (Chinese: 陳建宇; pinyin: Chén Jiànyǔ) is a Taiwanese lawyer and politician. He served as the Minister of Transportation and Communications from 9 January 2015 until 20 May 2016.

== Education ==
Chen obtained his bachelor's degree in law from Soochow University in 1979.

== Minister of Transportation and Communication ==
On 9 January 2015, Chen was appointed the acting Minister of Transportation and Communication after the resignation of former Minister Yeh Kuang-shih after his financial restructuring plan for Taiwan High Speed Rail Corporation was rejected earlier on. He was officially appointed to the ministerial position on 23 January.
