= Lin Tze-luen =

Taiwanese politician

- 林子倫
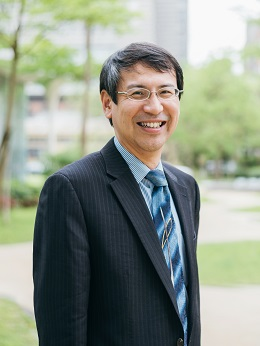
- Official portrait, 2024

10th Spokesperson of the Executive Yuan
- In office 15 May 2023 – 20 May 2024
- Prime Minister: Chen Chien-jen
- Preceded by: Lo Ping-cheng (acting)
- Succeeded by: Chen Shih-kai

Personal details
- Party: Independent

Lin Tze-luen (Chinese: 林子倫) is a Taiwanese politician. He was the spokesperson of the Executive Yuan from May 2023 to May 2024.
