= 2012 Taiwanese legislative election =

- 14 January 2012

All 113 seats in the Legislative Yuan 57 seats needed for a majority
- Registered: 17,980,578 (Note: District and indigenous electorate; party-list electorate size was 18,090,295)
- Turnout: 74.47% (Note: District and indigenous electorate; party-list voter turnout was 74.33%) ▲15.97 pp
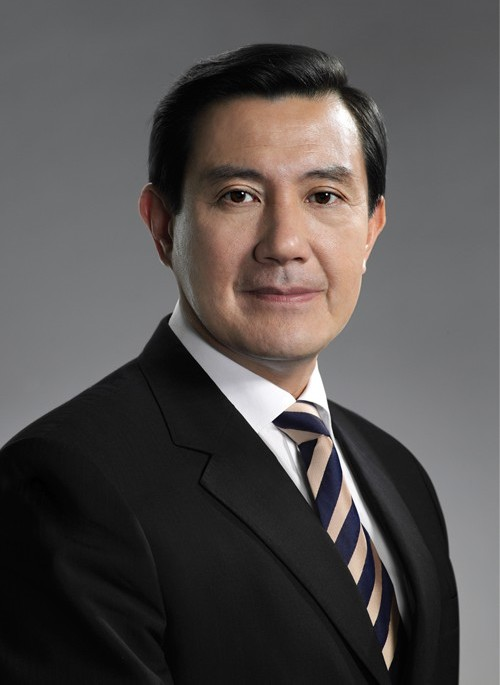

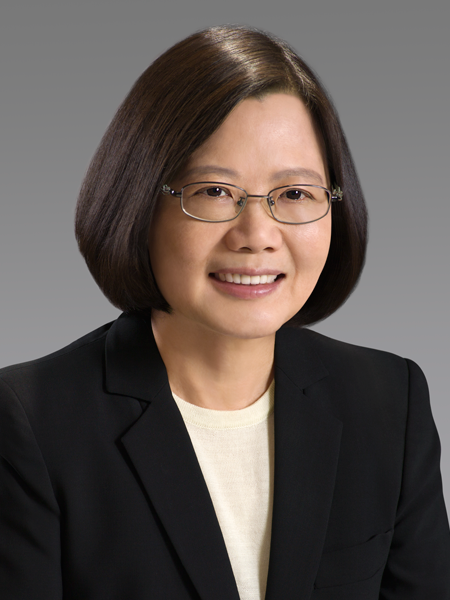

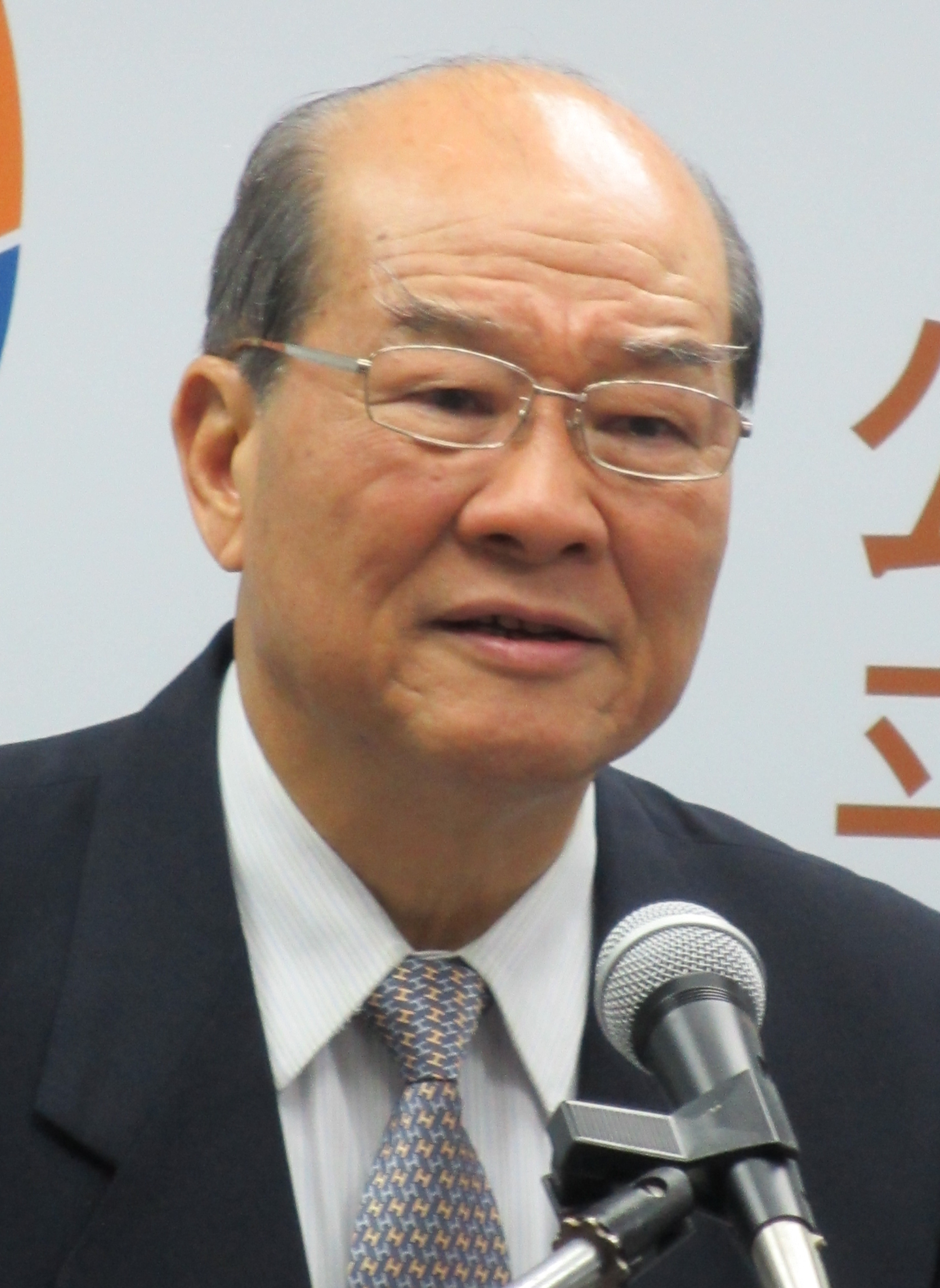

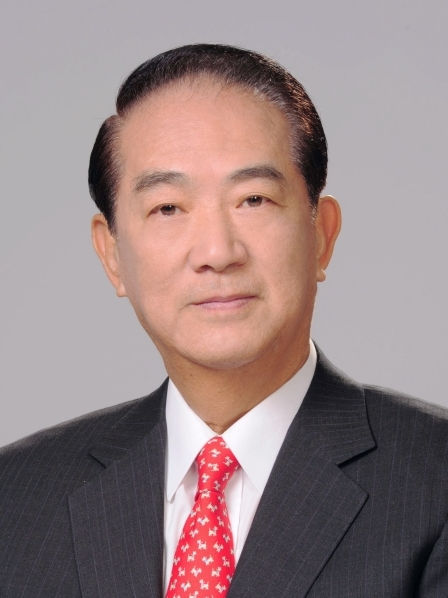
	Majority party	Minority party
Leader	Ma Ying-jeou	Tsai Ing-wen
Party	KMT	DPP
Leader since	17 October 2009	20 May 2008
Last election	81 seats	27 seats
Seats won	64	40
Seat change	▼17	▲13
Constituency vote	6,339,301; 48.18% ▲5.32pp	5,763,186; 43.80% ▲5.63pp
Party vote	5,863,379; 44.55% ▼6.68pp	4,556,526; 34.62% ▼2.29pp
	Third party	Fourth party
Leader	Huang Kun-huei	James Soong
Party	TSU	People First
Leader since	26 January 2007	31 March 2000
Last election	0 seats	1 seat
Seats won	3	3
Seat change	▲3	▲2
Constituency vote	Did not stand	175,032; 1.33% ▲1.04pp
Party vote	1,178,896; 8.96% ▲3.53pp	722,089; 5.49% — (Note: Did not stand in the party-list election in 2008)

- Election cartogram
President before election
Wang Jin-pyng
Kuomintang
Elected President
Wang Jin-pyng
KMT

Legislative elections were held in Taiwan on 16 January 2012 for all 113 seats in the Legislative Yuan. For the first time, the legislative elections were held simultaneously with the presidential election. Elected parliamentarians formed the fifteenth Legislative Yuan session since 1946, when the current constitution came into effect. Voting took place on 14 January 2012 between 08:00 and 16:00 local Taipei time at 14,806 polling stations nationwide.

== Electoral system ==
Members were elected by parallel voting.

== Subsidies ==
According to the "Civil Servants Election And Recall Act", subsidies are payable to the political parties who sponsor candidates for Legislative Yuan elections. Article 43 has the following specifications:

Every year the state shall apportion subsidies for campaign to the political parties, and the standard of apportionment shall be determined based on the latest election of members of the Legislative Yuan. If a ratio of vote attained by the political party achieves not less than 5% in the national integrated election and the overseas election of central civil servants, the subsidy for campaign funds shall be granted to the political party by a rate of NT$50 per vote every year. The Central Election Commission shall work out the amount of the subsidy every fiscal year, and notify the party to prepare the receipt and receive the subsidy from the Central Election Commission within 1 month, till the tenure of the current session of the members of the Legislative Yuan expires.

== Results ==
Party	Party-list			Constituency/Indigenous			Total seats	+/–
Party	Votes	%	Seats	Votes	%	Seats	Total seats	+/–
Kuomintang	5,863,379	44.55	16	6,339,301	48.18	48	64	–17
Democratic Progressive Party	4,556,526	34.62	13	5,763,186	43.80	27	40	+13
Taiwan Solidarity Union	1,178,896	8.96	3				3	+3
People First Party	722,089	5.49	2	175,032	1.33	1	3	+2
Green Party Taiwan	229,566	1.74	0	79,729	0.61	0	0	0
New Party	195,960	1.49	0	10,678	0.08	0	0	0
National Health Service Alliance	163,344	1.24	0	19,088	0.15	0	0	New
Taiwan National Congress	118,632	0.90	0	19,987	0.15	0	0	New
People United Party	84,818	0.64	0	13,044	0.10	0	0	New
Taiwanism Party	29,889	0.23	0	16,280	0.12	0	0	New
Taiwan Basic Laws Party	19,274	0.15	0	9,666	0.07	0	0	New
Non-Partisan Solidarity Union				168,861	1.28	2	2	–1
People are the Boss Alliance				5,852	0.04	0	0	New
Taiwan Businessmen Party				3,156	0.02	0	0	New
Righteous Party				1,852	0.01	0	0	New
Independents				532,270	4.05	1	1	0
Total	13,162,373	100.00	34	13,157,982	100.00	79	113	0
Valid votes	13,162,373	97.89		13,157,982	98.26			
Invalid/blank votes	283,619	2.11		232,344	1.74			
Total votes	13,445,992	100.00		13,390,326	100.00			
Registered voters/turnout	18,090,295	74.33		17,980,578	74.47			
Source: Election Study Center, Election Study Center, CSES

== Subsequent by-elections ==
Date	Constituency	Outgoing member	Incoming member
26 January 2013	Taichung 2	Yen Ching-piao	Yen Kuan-heng
7 February 2015	Changhua 4	Wei Ming-ku	Chen Su-yueh (陳素月)
7 February 2015	Miaoli 2	Hsu Yao-chang	Hsu Chih-jung (徐志榮)
7 February 2015	Nantou 2	Lin Ming-chen	Hsu Shu-hua
7 February 2015	Pingtung 3	Pan Men-an	Chuang Jui-hsiung (莊瑞雄)
7 February 2015	Taichung 6	Lin Chia-lung	Huang Kuo-shu

== See also ==
- Ninth Legislative Yuan
