= Li Meng-yen =

Mayor of Tainan from 2017 to 2018

- 李孟諺
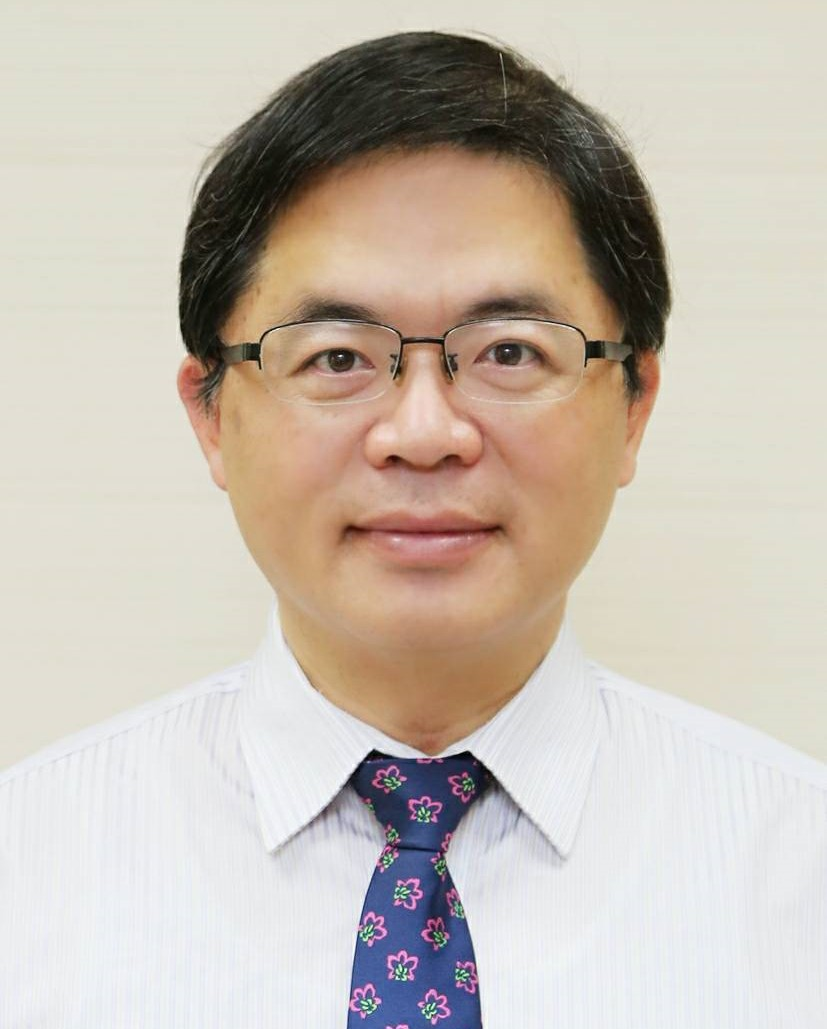
- Official portrait, 2017

29th Minister of Transportation and Communication
- In office 20 May 2024 – 19 August 2024
- Prime Minister: Cho Jung-tai
- Preceded by: Wang Kwo-tsai
- Succeeded by: Chen Yen-po (acting)

38th Secretary-General of the Executive Yuan
- In office 14 January 2019 – 20 May 2024
- Prime Minister: Su Tseng-chang; Chen Chien-jen
- Deputy: Ho Pei-shan; Sung Yu-hsieh
- Preceded by: Ho Pei-shan (acting)
- Succeeded by: Kung Ming-hsin

Acting Spokesperson of the Executive Yuan
- In office 6 November 2020 – 17 February 2021
- Prime Minister: Su Tseng-chang
- Preceded by: Ting Yi-ming
- Succeeded by: Lo Ping-cheng

Acting Mayor of Tainan
- In office 8 September 2017 – 25 December 2018
- Preceded by: William Lai
- Succeeded by: Huang Wei-che

Personal details
- Born: 12 December 1966 (age 59) Changhua County, Taiwan
- Party: Independent
- Spouse: Wu Mei-xiu
- Education: National Chung Hsing University (BS); IHE Delft Institute for Water Education (MSc)

Li Meng-yen (Chinese: 李孟諺; pinyin: Lǐ Mèngyàn; born 12 December 1966) is a Taiwanese politician and engineer. He has served as the minister of Transportation and Communications from May to August 2024 and secretary-general of the Executive Yuan from January 2019 to May 2024. In an acting capacity, he was mayor of Tainan from September 2017 to December 2018 and Executive Yuan spokesperson from November 2020 to February 2021.

== Education ==
Li graduated with his bachelor's degree in environmental engineering from National Chung Hsing University and earned a Master of Science (M.Sc.) in hydrology and engineering from the IHE Delft Institute for Water Education in the Netherlands.

== Political career ==
Li had been the assistant engineer and branch head of Housing and Urban Development Bureau of Taiwan Provincial Government. At the Taipei County Government, he had been the section chief and technical specialist of Public Works Bureau and acting and vice director-general of Water Resource Bureau and secretary. At the Public Construction Commission, he was the vice director of Department of Construction Management. At the Taipei City Government, he was the director of Sewerage Systems Office of Public Works Department.

=== Tainan City Government ===
In the Tainan City Government, he was the director-general of Water Resource Bureau and secretary-general. Li was appointed acting Tainan Mayor on 7 September 2017 as William Lai was named premier by president Tsai Ing-wen. Speaking at a summit held at National Cheng Kung University in June 2018, Li said that his city government aimed to declare English as the second official language of Tainan, starting by having bilingual signs on information at major public places.

=== Executive Yuan ===
He took office as secretary-general of the Executive Yuan on 14 January 2019, with the second Su Tseng-chang cabinet. Li was named the spokesman of the Executive Yuan on an interim basis on 15 November 2020, following the resignation of Ting Yi-ming from the position. Li was named Minister of Transportation and Communications in the Cho Jung-tai-led Executive Yuan on 12 April 2024. Li resigned from the Cho cabinet on 19 August 2024, after posts to PTT indicated that he had been in an extramarital affair for ten years.

Political offices
Preceded by Lai Ching-te	Mayor of Tainan; Acting; 2017–2018	Succeeded by Huang Wei-cher
