= Lee Tsung-hsiao =

Lee Tsung-hsiao (Chinese: 李宗孝; born 1963) is a Taiwanese military officer.

By 2012, Lee was working for the office of the Chief of the General Staff. By 2017, he had been named chief of staff of the Navy Command Headquarters. In this role, he met with the Legislative Yuan's Foreign and National Defense Committee multiple times. He reported on the contract in force between Ching Fu Shipbuilding Company and the Ministry of National Defense in October 2017, and on the status of the TC-2N missile in December 2017. The next year, he briefed legislators about plans to build submarines, the construction of Tuo Jiang-class corvettes in May, the commissioning of Oliver Hazard Perry-class frigates in October, and the design and testing of a fast-attack craft in December. Lee was later appointed administrative deputy minister of national defense.

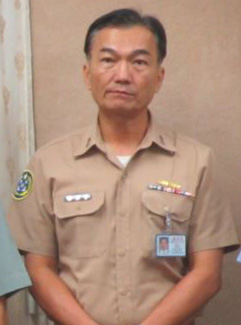
Lee Tsung-hsiao
