= Chen Po-wei =

Taiwanese politician

- 陳柏惟
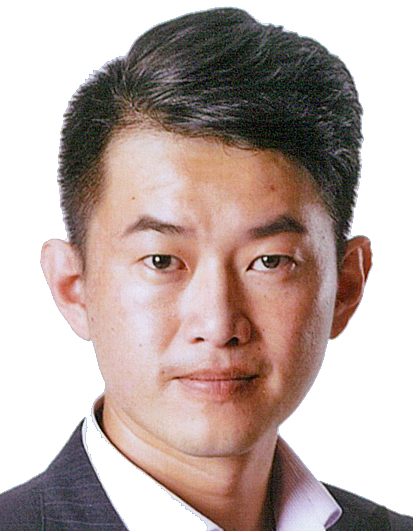

Member of the Legislative Yuan
- In office 1 February 2020 – 28 October 2021
- Preceded by: Yen Kuan-heng
- Succeeded by: Lin Ching-yi
- Constituency: Taichung 2

Personal details
- Born: 10 July 1985 (age 41) Yancheng District, Kaohsiung, Taiwan
- Party: Independent
- Other political affiliations: Taiwan Statebuilding Party (2018–2022)
- Education: National University of Kaohsiung (BA)

Chen Po-wei (Chinese: 陳柏惟; Pe̍h-ōe-jī: Tân Pek-ûi; born 10 July 1985) is a Taiwanese politician. He was the first ever Taiwan Statebuilding Party candidate to be elected to the Legislative Yuan, defeating Kuomintang incumbent Yen Kuan-heng in the 2020 Taiwanese legislative election. In October 2021, Chen became the first member of the Legislative Yuan to lose his office via a successful recall election.

== Early career ==
Chen worked in the film industry before pursuing political office. He studied at the National University of Kaohsiung.

== Political career ==
Chen began his political career by running for a seat on the Kaohsiung City Council. After losing that election, he moved from Kaohsiung. Chen served as the spokesperson for the Taiwan Statebuilding Party (then known as Taiwan Radical Wings) and supported a recall movement against Kaohsiung City Mayor Han Kuo-yu. Throughout his political career, he has been a vocal supporter of Taiwan independence.

In the 2020 legislative elections, Chen defeated Kuomintang incumbent Yen Kuan-heng in the Taichung City Constituency II becoming the first Taiwan Statebuilding Party legislator. His candidacy was supported by the Democratic Progressive Party and filmmaker Wu Nien-jen.

In late 2020, Chen stood with Democratic Progressive Party to support the import of American pork with ractopamine.

A proposal to recall Chen from office collected 3,744 valid signatures by 5 March 2021, and 36,073 valid signatures by 2 July 2021, prompting the Central Election Commission to tentatively schedule a recall election for 28 August, the same date as the originally scheduled 2021 Taiwanese referendum. Due to effects of the COVID-19 pandemic in Taiwan, the CEC announced on 16 July 2021 that Chen's recall election would be postponed to 23 October 2021. A week before the recall vote, groups supporting Chen participated in a march starting at Zushi Temple in Qingshui. Chen became the first Taiwanese member of the Legislative Yuan to be successfully recalled, ending his term less than two years into office. Votes for Chen's recall numbered 77,899, against 73,433 opposing his recall. Votes supporting the recall topped 25% of the eligible electorate (73,744), with 51.72 percent voter turnout. Per Article 92 of the Civil Servants Election and Recall Act, Chen will be ineligible to run for the Legislative Yuan in Taichung's second district for the next four years.

Chen was officially dismissed from the Legislative Yuan on 28 October 2021. Lin Ching-yi ran to succeed Chen, and he was secretary-general of her legislative campaign. In July 2022, Chen left the Taiwan Statebuilding Party, and joined the Taichung mayoral campaign of Democratic Progressive Party candidate Tsai Chi-chang.

== Legacy ==
=== Application of National Languages Development Act ===
On 27 September 2021, as the National Languages Development Act in 2018 stipulates the public services for national languages including the interpreters in the legislature., and Chen having followed the regulation of Legislative Yan to applied in advance the real-time interpretation service and 3 Taiwanese interpreters had been present ready at site, Legislator, Chen proceeded his scheduled questioning session in Taiwanese during the Foreign and National Defense Committee. The Minister of National Defense Chiu Kuo-cheng did not accept the interpreter's assistance at site, but insisted to bring the deputy minister Lee Tsung-hsiao as his own interpreter. Chiu repeatedly interrupted the question process by asking Chen to speak Mandarin Chinese for easier communication, or the session time cannot be lengthened to accommodate the interpretation, but Lee's translation contained contextual errors, so Chen I-hsin intervened during the heated argument and tried to introduce the existing real-time synchronized interpretation on progress at site as the solution same as the common conference practice in the other countries, but Chiu still insisted his way Chen later apologized to the public for the good intention of practicing the national language law being turned into a linguistic communication tragedy, and condemned Chiu for "bullying" (鴨霸), but Chiu denied the allegation and claimed that a language is a tool of communication. The parliamentary interpretation service were temporarily suspended afterwards pending on better communication in the future - consequently the other parliament members and media editorials such as Kuan Bi-ling and Taipei Times commented that Language is not just a tool of communication (as Chiu said), but also an identity of feelings and culture. Councilor Miao Poya also explained that the multi-lingual working environment is essential for a healthy mind without the "Chinese Language Supremacy" (華語至上) attitude to achieve the international level in diversity, equality and mutual respect for a modern state.
