= Highway Bureau =

Government agency based in Wanhua, Taipei, Taiwan

- 公路局

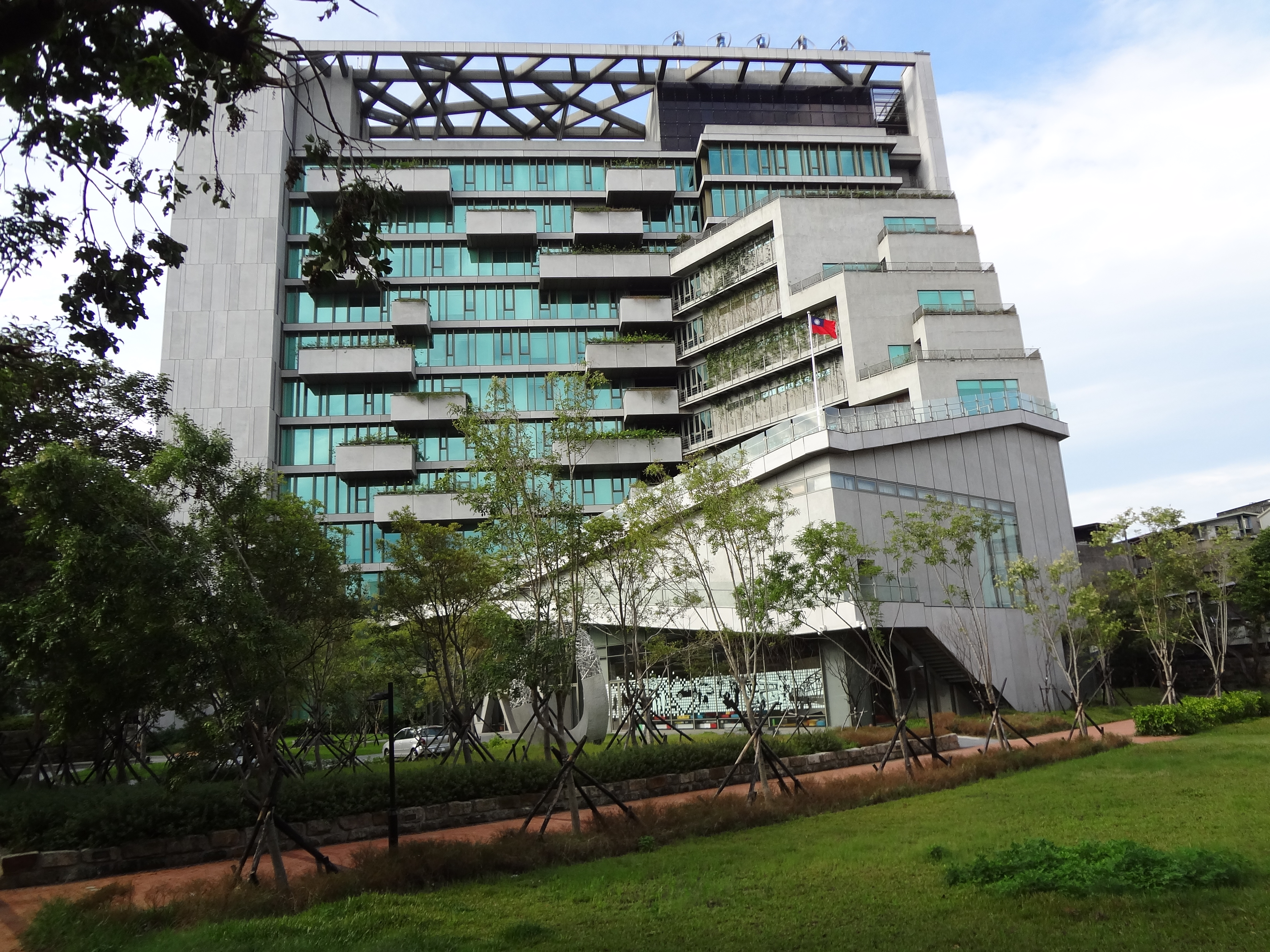

Agency overview
- Formed: April 1943
- Jurisdiction: Republic of China
- Headquarters: Wanhua, Taipei, Taiwan; 25°01′35.1″N 121°29′47.4″E
- Agency executives: Hsu Cheng-chang, Director-General; Huang Yung-kuei, Deputy Director-General
- Parent agency: Ministry of Transportation and Communications
- Website: Official website

The Highway Bureau (Chinese: 公路局; pinyin: Gōnglù Jú) is the government agency under the Ministry of Transportation and Communications of the Republic of China (Taiwan) responsible for highway transportation management.

== History ==
The agency was originally established as Directorate General of Highways in April 1943. It was later renamed as Highway Bureau in 1999.

== Organizational structures ==
- Reconsideration Committee for Traffic Accident Investigation
- Civil Service Ethics Office
- Accounting Office
- Personnel Office
- Secretariat
- Information Management Office
- Motor Vehicles Division
- Equipment and Supplies Division
- Land Acquisition Division
- Maintenance Division
- Construction and Design Division
- Planning Division
- Highway Disaster Prevention Center

== Director-Generals ==
- Chen Yen-po
- Hsu Cheng-chang (incumbent)

== See also ==
- Executive Yuan
- Highway system in Taiwan
