= Lin Ching-yi =

Taiwanese health economist, physician, and politician

Lin Ching-yi MLY
- 林靜儀
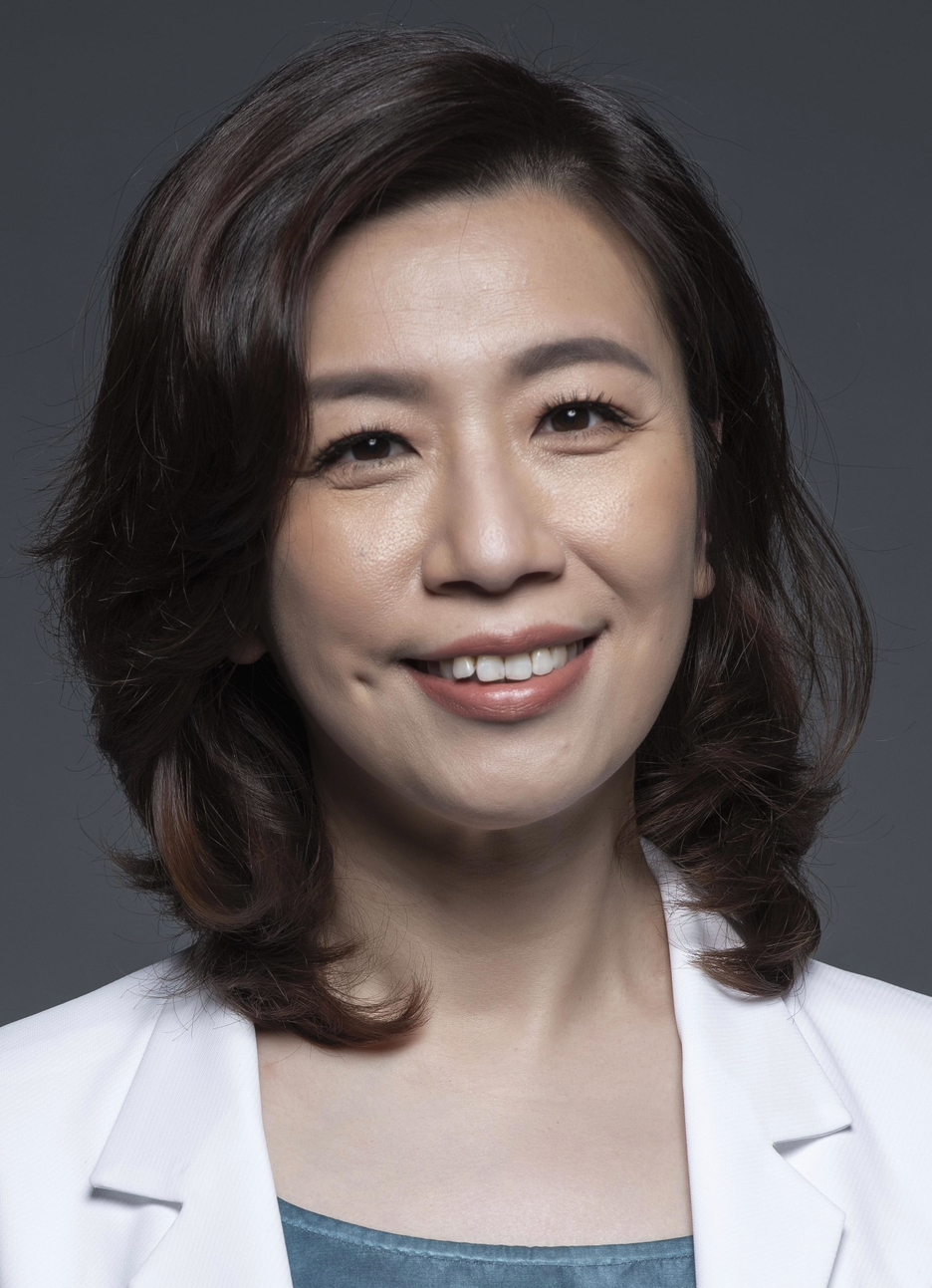
- Official portrait, 2024

Deputy Minister of Health and Welfare
- Incumbent
- Assumed office 20 May 2024
- Minister: Chiu Tai-yuan
- Preceded by: Wang Pi-sheng

Member of the Legislative Yuan
- In office 14 January 2022 – 31 January 2024
- Preceded by: Chen Po-wei
- Succeeded by: Yen Kuan-heng
- Constituency: Taichung 2
- In office 1 February 2016 – 31 January 2020
- Constituency: Party-list Proportional Representation

Taiwanese Ambassador without Portfolio
- In office 15 June 2020 – 17 January 2022
- Appointed by: Tsai Ing-wen

Personal details
- Born: 12 February 1974 (age 52) Lugu, Nantou, Taiwan
- Party: Democratic Progressive Party
- Education: Chung Shan Medical University (MD, MS); National Taiwan University (MS); National Sun Yat-sen University (PhD)
- Profession: Obstetrician-gynecologist
- Scientific career
- Fields: Health economics
- Thesis: The education, labor force participation, and economics of teenage mothers: An analysis based on data from the Taiwan-born cohort study (2020)

Lin Ching-yi (Chinese: 林靜儀; born 12 February 1974) is a Taiwanese health economist, gynaecologist, and politician has been Deputy Minister of Health and Welfare since 2024. She was previously a member of the Legislative Yuan from 2016 to 2020 and from 2022 to 2024.

== Education ==
After graduating from Taichung Municipal Girls' Senior High School, Lin studied medicine at Chung Shan Medical University, where she earned a Doctor of Medicine (M.D.) in 1992 and a master's degree in clinical medicine in 1999. She then earned a Master of Science (M.S.) in molecular medicine and genetic counseling from National Taiwan University.

In 2020, Lin earned her Ph.D. in medicine from National Sun Yat-sen University. Her doctoral dissertation was titled, "The education, labor force participation, and economics of teenage mothers: An analysis based on data from the Taiwan-born cohort study" (未成年母親的教育、勞動參與與經濟—以台灣出生世代研究資料分析).

== Medical career ==
After earning her degree Lin worked at the Chung Shan Medical University Hospital as an obstetrician and gynecologist. For a decade, she was affiliated with the International Medical Service Program as a volunteer physician, and traveled to many nations, among them Nepal, India, Kyrgyzstan, and Tuvalu.

== Political career ==
Lin was named to the Gender Equality Committee of the Executive Yuan in 2014, but stated that she could not ignore the effects of the Sunflower Student Movement and subsequently resigned the position. In May, Lin accepted an appointment to the Department of Women’s Development within the Democratic Progressive Party, calling the movement a political inspiration.

She was elected to the Legislative Yuan via the proportional representation ballot in January 2016. When the legislature established the UN Sustainable Development Goals Advisory Council in September 2017, Lin was named chairperson. In February 2019, she was appointed leader of the Democratic Progressive Party's international affairs department. While acting as spokeswoman for the Tsai Ing-wen presidential reelection campaign in 2020, Lin was interviewed by Deutsche Welle. During the interview, she stated, "Constitutionally, and presently, we consider the Chinese Communist Party a menacing party and a menacing regime. They have missiles targeting us and have incessantly threatened to invade us by force ... To the nation, such a propositions are treasonous. They are unacceptable and will spark discussions on the limits of freedom of speech." Lin said supporters of Chinese unification "are calling for the nation’s sovereignty to be abandoned so that it can become a part of China", a view she considered treasonous "on many fronts". She subsequently resigned from Tsai's campaign.

Chen Po-wei was recalled from the Legislative Yuan in October 2021, and a by-election for Taichung's second constituency, Chen's vacant seat, was scheduled for 9 January 2022. The Democratic Progressive Party nominated Lin to run in the by-election on 3 November 2021. Twelve days later, Lin formally registered her candidacy. In addition to Lin Chin-yi and Kuomintang candidate Yen Kuan-heng, there were two independent candidates contesting the by-election, Lin Chin-lien and Lee Sheng-han. Chang Chiung-chun represented the Taiwan Stock Investors' Party. Lin won the by-election, finishing ahead of Yen and the other three minor party and independent candidates.

=== Legislative actions ===
From November 2017, Lin headed reviews of amendments to the Labor Standards Act, in her capacity as member of the Legislative Yuan's Economics Committee and the Social Welfare and Environmental Hygiene Committee. Opposition parties repeatedly delayed consideration of the amendments, which were opposed by a number of labor organizations. criticized Lin's leadership, and engaged in physical confrontations over the bill, which passed in January 2018.

In December 2017, an amendment proposed by Lin to Article 82 of the Medical Act passed. The amendment enumerated the conditions under which medical professionals could face criminal charges if patients were harmed as a result of medical procedures. The legislature passed amendments to the HIV Infection Control and Patient Rights Protection Act in May 2018, one of which was initiated by Lin and exempted HIV+ people from disclosing their status to paramedics under certain conditions.

In December 2018, Lin proposed an amendment to the Referendum Act.

=== Political stances ===
Lin is supportive of pension reform, a larger tax on tobacco products, and amendments to marital law in Taiwan, so both men and women can consent to marriage at the age of eighteen. Lin and Yu Mei-nu have co-sponsored amendments to the Civil Code in an attempt to legalize same-sex marriage in Taiwan. Lin, who began attending parallel events hosted alongside the UN Commission on the Status of Women since 2012, has been critical of China's treatment of Taiwan on the international stage, and has backed calls for Taiwan to participate in intergovernmental organizations.

In February 2020, Lin complimented the Central Epidemic Command Center on its actions during the COVID-19 pandemic, and petitioned the Mainland Affairs Council to maintain its protocols when arranging evacuation flights from China.

On 4 May 2024, Lin was appointed a deputy minister of health and welfare under Chiu Tai-yuan.

== Controveries ==
=== Repeated Misinformation Publications and Attacks Against Hong Kong People ===
More than once, Lin has published false information about Hong Kong people and used it to attack Hong Kong people and oppose the Executive Yuan's measures to support Hong Kong people in response to the deteriorating situation in Hong Kong.

In early April 2022, Hong Kong artist Wong He entered Taiwan via Taoyuan Airport and was injured due to profuse bleeding during the testing process. The incident attracted the attention of many netizens in Hong Kong and Taiwan. Lin posted a screenshot from Hong Kong's Ming Pao on her personal social networking site, questioning why Wong was able to enter Taiwan on April 3 when she was diagnosed on March 30. She suspected that Wang Xi got a negative PCR report before boarding. The Ming Pao text actually mentions that Wong was no longer unwell on the 25th and had recovered before boarding the plane, only the Ming Pao reported until March 30. However, the screenshot provided by Lin did not include the content of the report, and did not provide a link to the Ming Pao website, making it impossible for the public to verify.

In addition, at a meeting of the Legislative Yuan Foreign Affairs and Defense Committee in May 2022, Lin said Hong Kong began internal national education brainwashing in 2012, praising the history of Chinese Communist Party nationalism, and based on this, questioning the Taiwanese government's measures to support Hong Kong people and open Hong Kong and Macau residents without residency qualifications to Taiwan to attend high schools after the Hong Kong version of the National Security Law was forcibly implemented by Beijing. However, in 2012, the Hong Kong government was preparing to implement the original brainwashing education curriculum. As a result, many secondary school students, including the Student Movement, including Joshua Wong, launched a large-scale protest, leading to a successful retraction. Lin's statement is not consistent with the facts.

Former Hong Kong Democratic Party District Councilor Lai Man-fai criticized Lin Jing-yi for slandering Hong Kong people with false information on social media on May 17, 2022, and mentioned the success of the anti-state religion movement in Hong Kong to refute Lin Jing-yi. He also said that Lin Jing-yi had recently booked a venue to watch the film "Revolution of the Times", which chronicled the Hong Kong anti-End China movement, and now uses information to attack Hong Kong people, which is so hypocritical that it makes people sick. In addition, the Hong Kong Future Concern Group also issued a statement condemning Lin Jingyi’s wrongful accusation that Hong Kong started internal national education brainwashing work in 2012, saying that discussions on the measures should be rational discussions on national resources, population policy, etc., but not based on lies . Former Hong Kong Legislative Councilor Wong Yuk-min also criticized Lam Jing-yi on social media on June 19 for "not acquainting with Hong Kong and talking nonsense". In Taiwan's political commentary, CUHK scholar Wu Jiemin also questioned whether Lin Jingyi should have a thorough understanding of the ins and outs, pros and cons of national policy when she first booked "Revolution of the Times" in Taichung. Doing so now will only make people think that the government is not keeping its word. He also criticized Lin Jingyi for just rubbing her voice.

In April 2025, a scholar published an article in the academic journal International Review on Public and Nonprofit Marketing, condemning Lin Jingyi for publishing false and untrue information on the Hong Kong people issue more than once.
