= Hochen Tan =

Taiwanese politician (born 1950)

- 賀陳旦
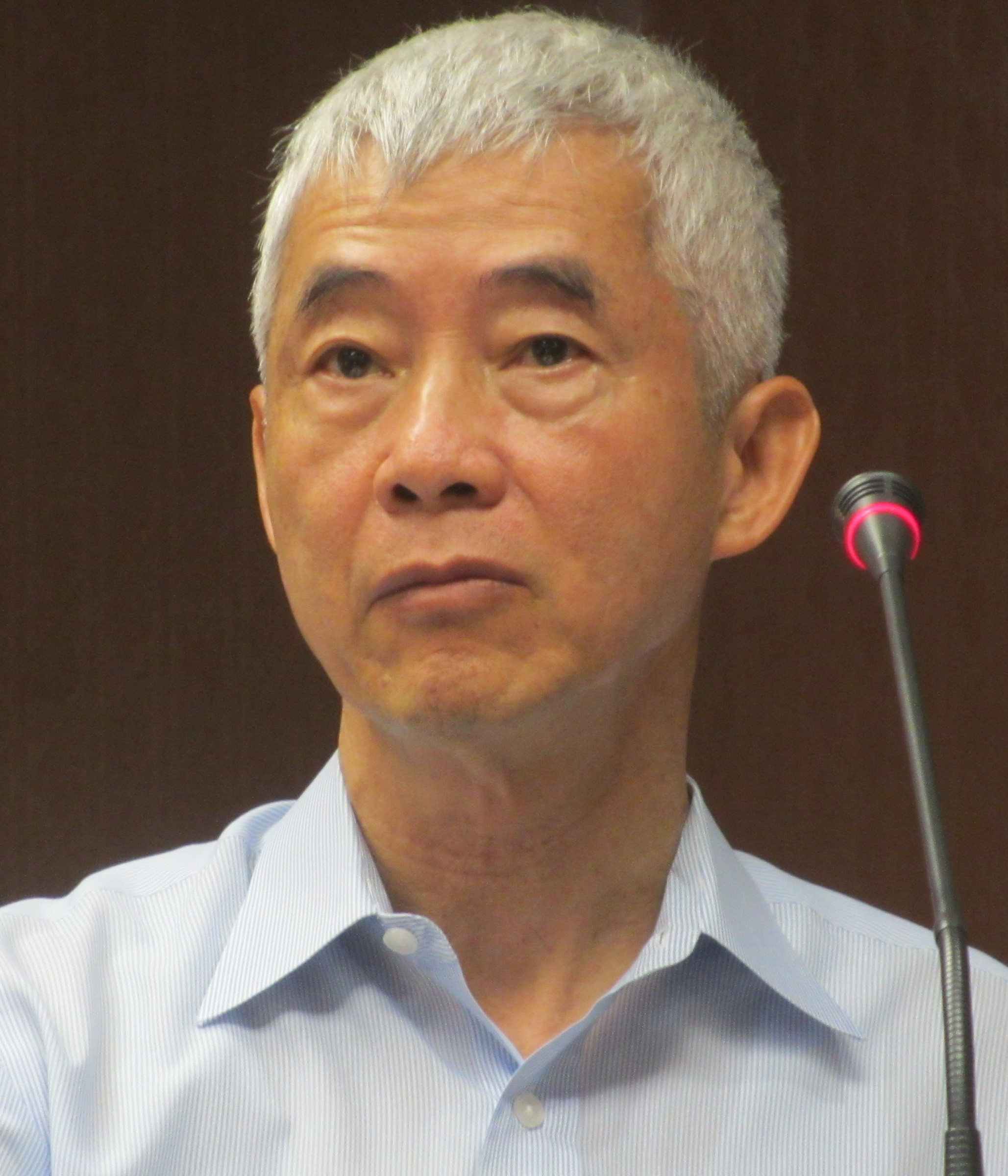

Minister of Transportation and Communications of the Republic of China
- In office 20 May 2016 – 16 July 2018
- Deputy: Wang Kwo-tsai (political); Fan Chih-ku, Wu Men-feng (administrative)
- Preceded by: Chen Jian-yu
- Succeeded by: Wu Hong-mo

Director of the Department of Transportation, Taipei City Government
- In office 8 June 1995 – 24 December 1998
- Appointed by: Chen Shui-bian
- Preceded by: Pu Ta-wei
- Succeeded by: Tsao Shou-min

Personal details
- Born: 6 December 1950 (age 75)
- Party: Independent
- Relatives: Hocheng Hong (brother)
- Education: National Chung Hsing University (BS); Virginia Polytechnic Institute and State University (MS)

Hochen Tan (Chinese: 賀陳旦; pinyin: Hèchén Dàn; born 6 December 1950) is a Taiwanese politician. He was the Minister of Transportation and Communications of the Republic of China from 20 May 2016 until 16 July 2018. He is the elder brother of Hocheng Hong.

== Education ==
Hochen obtained his bachelor's degree in civil engineering from National Chung Hsing University in 1973 and earned his master's degree in urban and regional planning from the Virginia Polytechnic Institute and State University in the United States in 1980.

== Political career ==
=== Department of Transportation, Taipei City Government ===
In 1997, while serving as head of Taipei City Government's Department of Transportation, Hochen implemented a traffic plan that designated pedestrian crosswalks and signals, leading to a decline in the use of pedestrian overpasses.

=== Ministry of Transportation and Communications ===
==== 2016 APEC Tourism Ministerial Meeting ====
Hochen led a delegation from Taiwan to attend the APEC Tourism Ministerial Meeting on 28–29 May 2016 in Peru.
