= Ministry of Transportation and Communications (Taiwan) =

Government ministry of Taiwan

- 中華民國交通部; Zhōnghuámínguó Jiāotōngbù (Mandarin); Kâu-thûng Phu (Hakka)
- Seal of the Ministry of Transportation and Communications

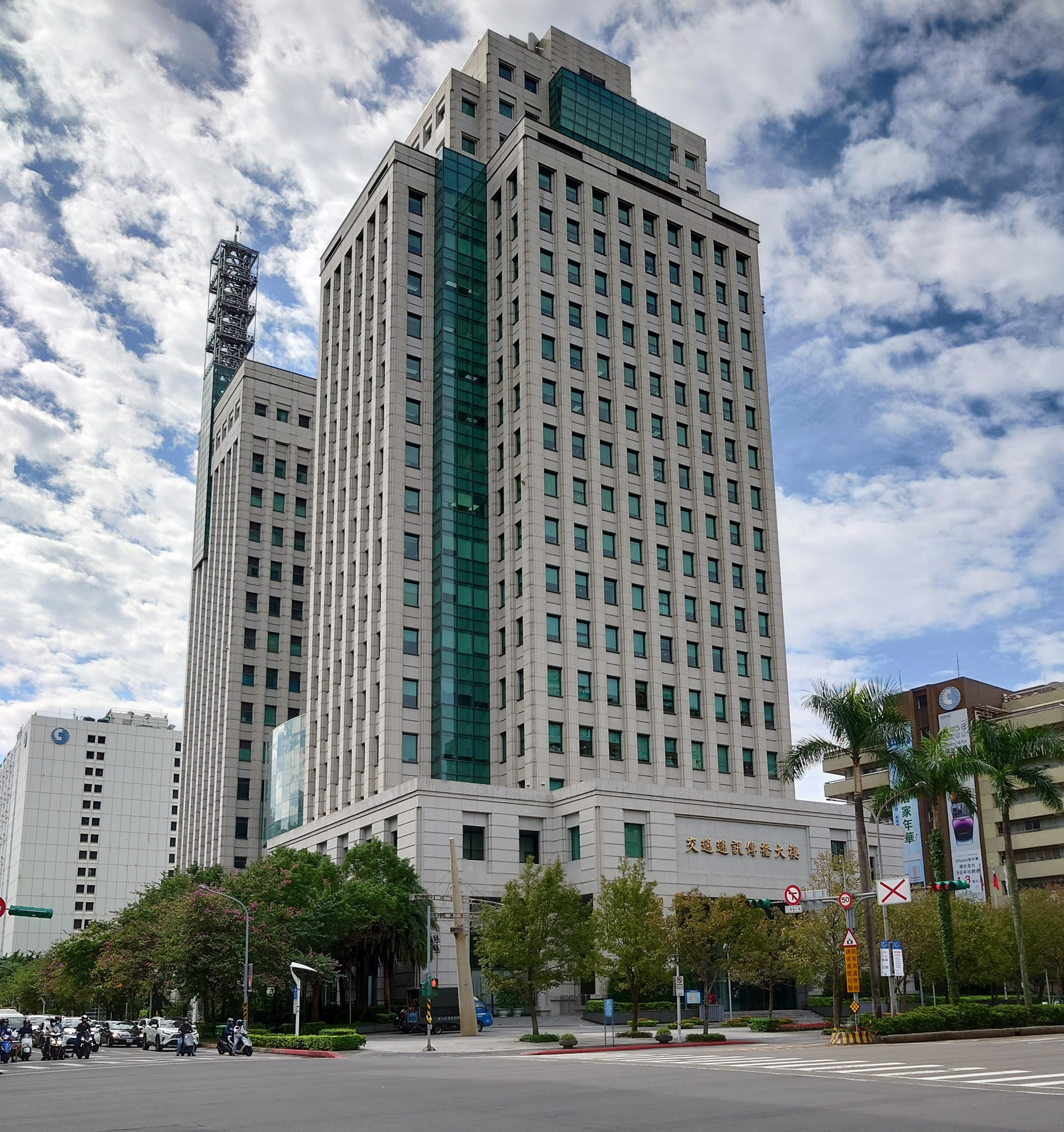

Agency overview
- Formed: 3 January 1912
- Preceding agency: Ministry of Posts and Communications
- Jurisdiction: Taiwan
- Headquarters: Zhongzheng, Taipei
- Ministers responsible: Chen Shih-kai, Minister; Chen Yen-po, Political Deputy Minister; Wu Sheng-yuan, Political Deputy Minister; Lin Kuo-shian, Administrative Deputy Minister
- Agency executive: Shen Hui-hung, Secretary-General
- Parent agency: Executive Yuan
- Website: www.motc.gov.tw

The Ministry of Transportation and Communications (MOTC; Chinese: 交通部; pinyin: Jiāotōngbù; Pe̍h-ōe-jī: Kau-thong-pō͘) is a cabinet-level governmental body of Taiwan in charge of all policy and regulation of transportation and communications networks and administration of all transportation and communications operations and enterprises in Taiwan.

== History ==
The Ministry of Transportation and Communications in its current form can be traced back to the post-WWII merger of two earlier ministries, namely the earlier iteration of the Ministry of Communications of the Republic of China (founded in 1912 by the Beiyang government to succeed the former Ministry of Posts and Communications of the later Qing Dynasty), and the Communications Department of the Transportation Bureau of the Governor-General of Taiwan.

Until 2006, the MOTC was also responsible for regulating Taiwan's broadcasting and telecommunications sector, as well as said country's frequency allocations and spectrum management, when that function was split off into a new statutory body called the National Communications Commission.

== Introduction ==
In Taiwan, transportation and communications operations comprise four categories: communications, transportation, meteorology, and tourism. The Ministry of Transportation and Communications is responsible for making policy, formulating laws and regulations, and overseeing operations in the area of transportation and communications.

Communications operations encompass postal services and telecommunications. Postal services are managed by the Chunghwa Post. Regarding telecommunications, the MOTC is responsible for the overall planning of communications resources, assisting and promoting the communications industry, and fostering universal access to communications.

Transportation operations are divided into land, sea, and air transportation.

Land transportation comprises railways (including conventional railways, mass rapid transit, and high-speed rail) as well as highway transportation. Conventional railways is operated by the Taiwan Railways Administration. Mass rapid transit systems are managed by local governments. High-speed rail is managed by the Taiwan High Speed Rail. Highway transportation is managed by the Directorate General of Highways. Expressways are constructed and maintained by the Freeway Bureau.

Sea transportation consists of water transport and harbors. Shipping carriers of water transport are privately operated, while harbors are operated by the Taiwan International Ports Corporation.

Air transportation includes airline companies and airports. Airline companies are privately operated, while airports and flight navigation services are operated by the Civil Aeronautics Administration.

The Central Weather Bureau under this ministry handles all national meteorological operations.

The Tourism Bureau under this ministry provides planning and oversight for tourism development.

== Organization ==
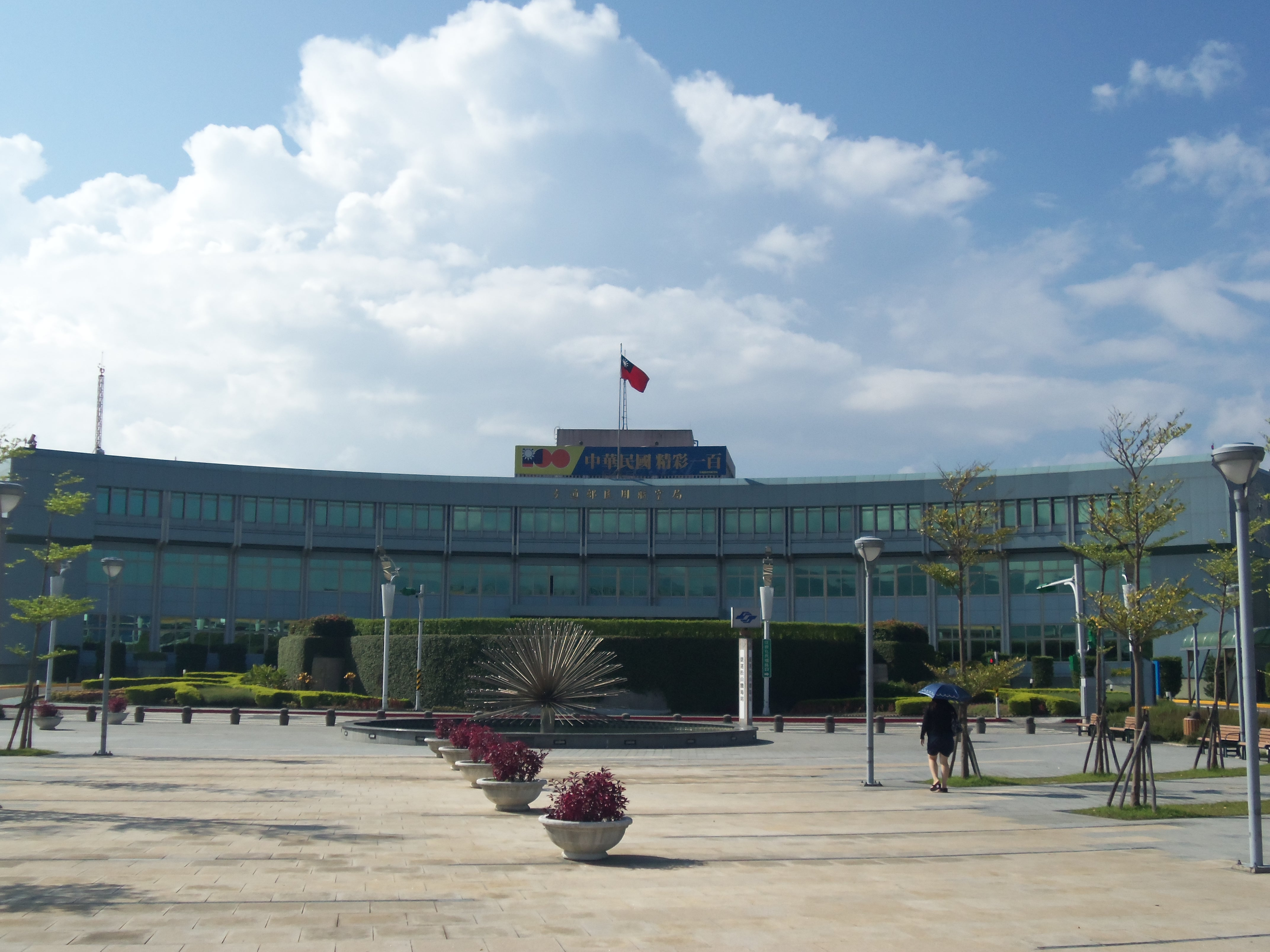
Civil Aviation Administration

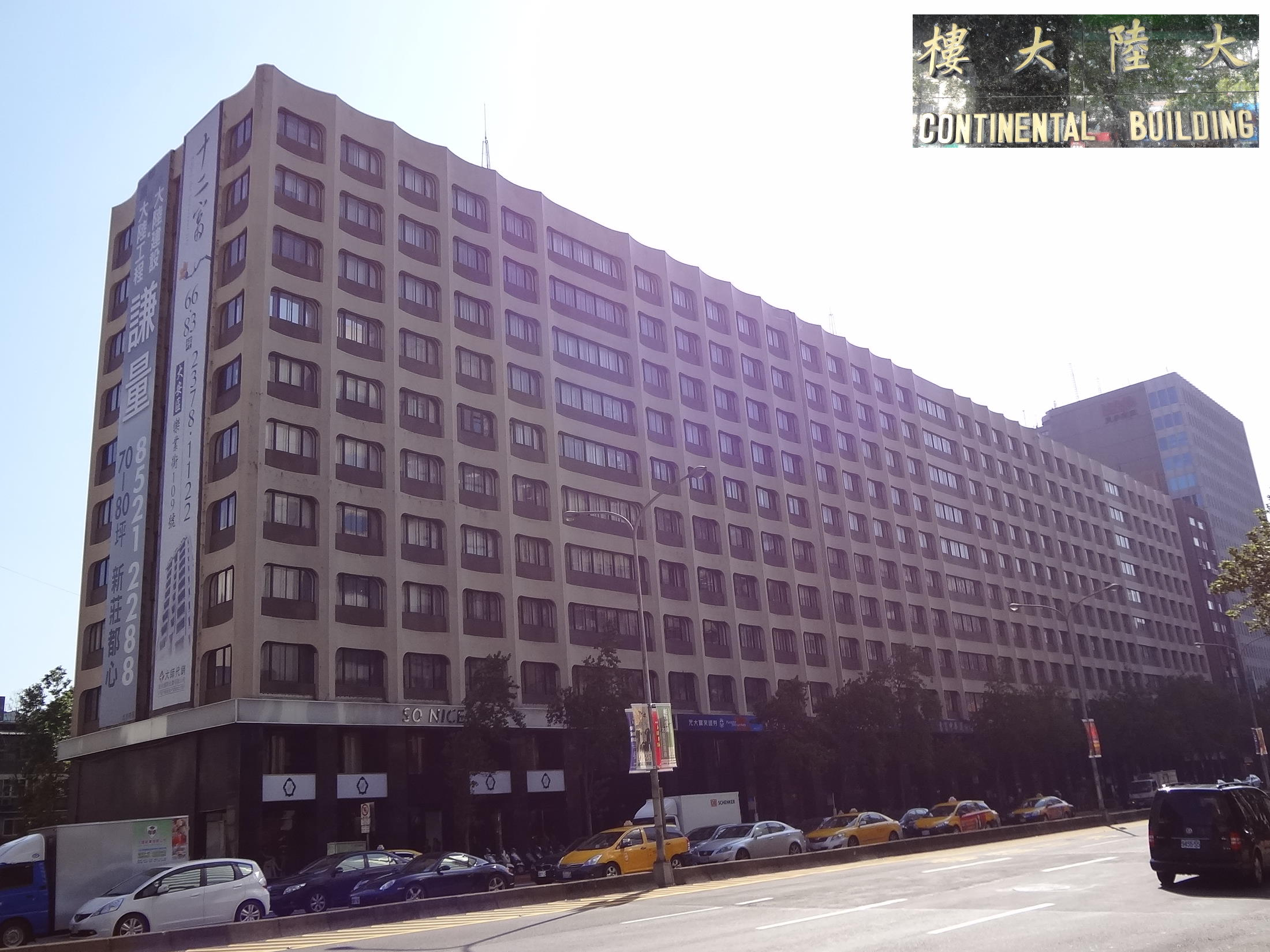
Tourism Bureau

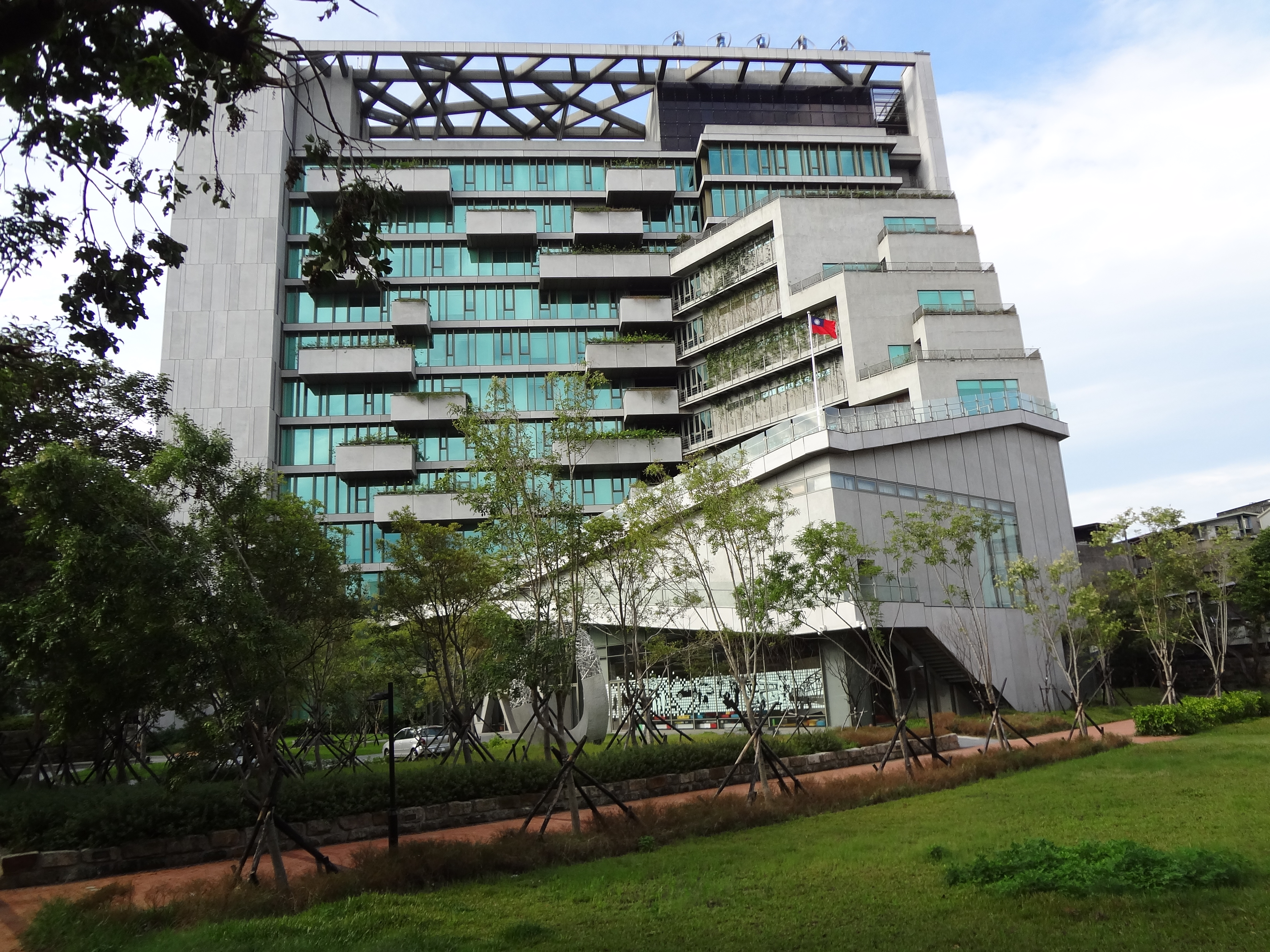
Directorate General of Highways

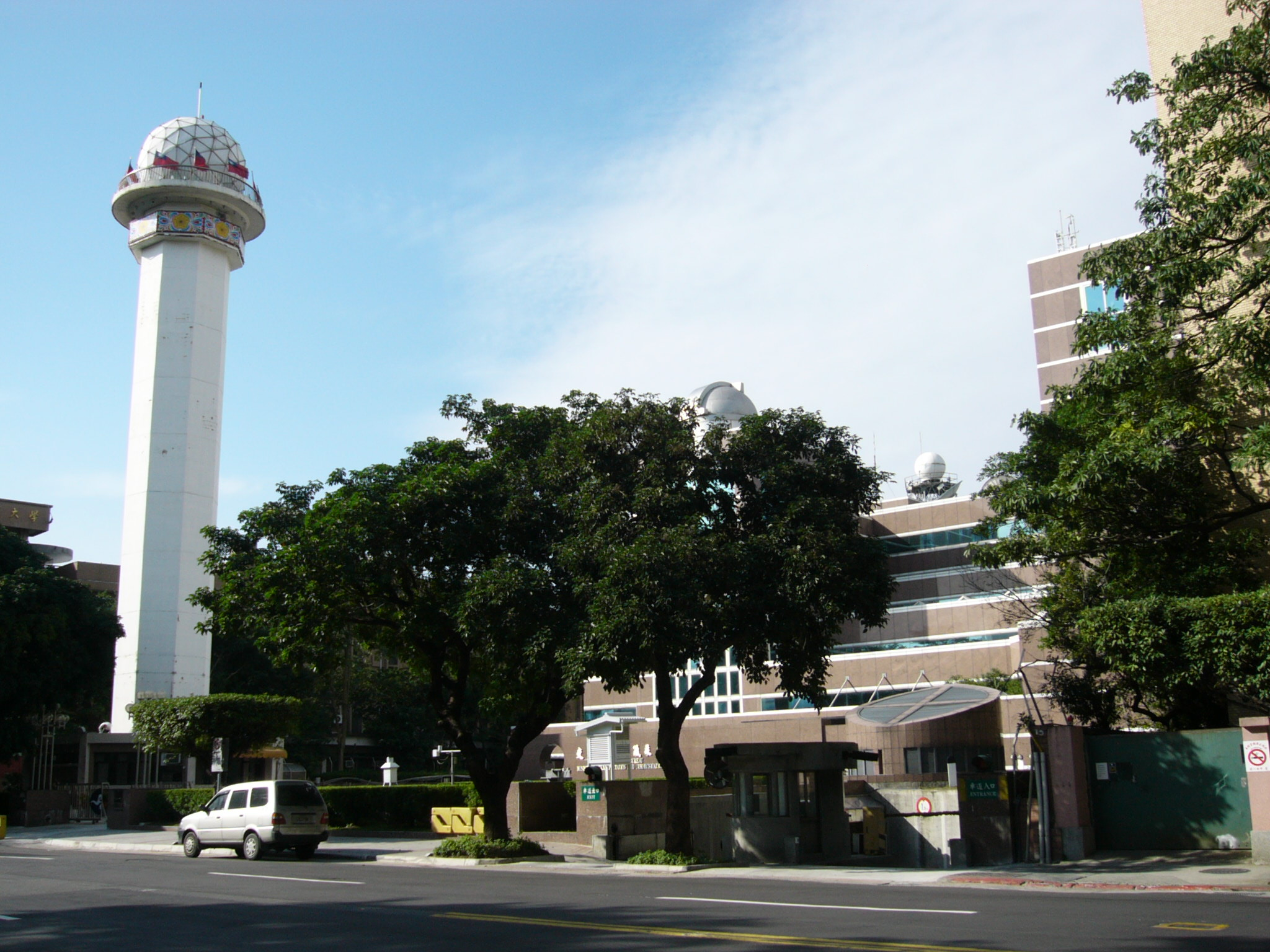
Central Weather Bureau

The administrators of MOTC include the Minister, Executive Vice Minister, and two Administrative Deputy Ministers.

MOTC is divided into an Internal Division and an External Division.

=== Internal division ===
Secretariat, Office of Technical Superintendents, Office of Counselors, Department of General Affairs, Department of Personnel, Department of Civil Service Ethics, Department of Accounting, Department of Statistics, Legal Affairs Committee, Petition Reviewing Committee, Road Traffic Safety Committee, Office of Science and Technology Advisors, Information Management Center, Transportation Mobilization Committee, Department of Railways and Highways, Department of Posts and Telecommunications, Department of Navigation and Aviation, Transportation and Communications Management Unit.

=== Administrative agencies ===
- Freeway Bureau
- Civil Aviation Administration
- Tourism Administration
- Highway Bureau
- Central Weather Administration
- Railway Bureau
- Maritime and Port Bureau
- Institute of Transportation

=== Government corporations ===
- Chunghwa Post Co., Ltd.
- Taiwan Railways Corporation (formerly the Taiwan Railways Administration)
- Taoyuan International Airport Corporation
- Taiwan International Ports Corporation
- Kaohsiung Port Land Development Corporation, Ltd. (co-owned by Taiwan International Ports Corporation and Kaohsiung City Government)

== List of ministers ==
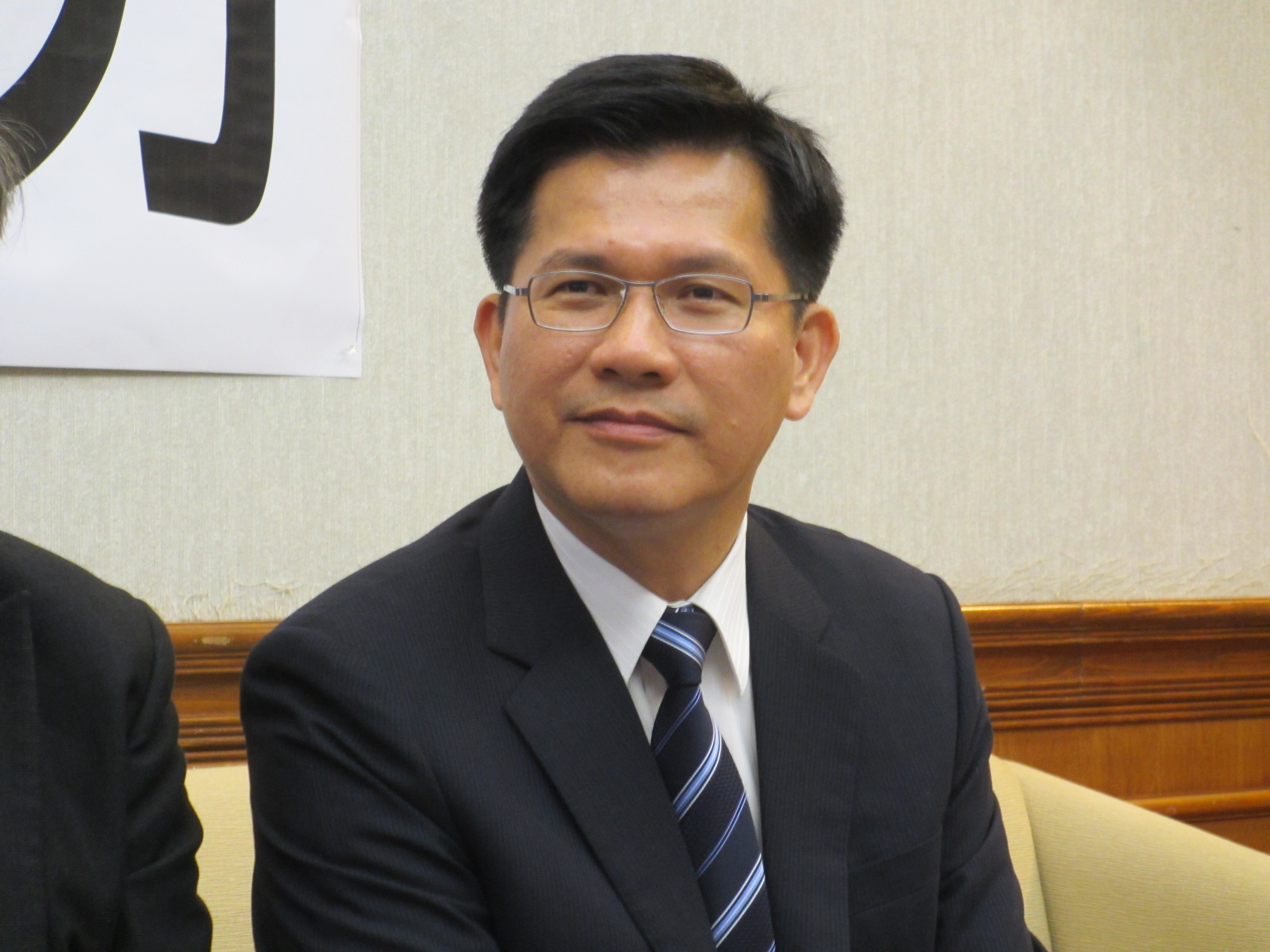
Lin Chia-lung, former Minister of Transportation and Communications

Political party: Kuomintang Non-partisan/ unknown Democratic Progressive Party

In the latter half of the 20th century, the ministry was created by merging the separate ministries of Transportation (c. 1912), Communications (c. 1938), and Railways (c. 1928 replacing the earlier iteration of the Ministry of Communications and links to the Ministry of Posts and Communications of Imperial China).

- Sun Fo Minister of Communications (1926 - 1927), Minister of Railways (1928-1931)
- Wang Boqun (1927 – 1931)
- Chen Mingshu Minister of Communications (December 1931 – October 1932)
- Huang Shaohong (July 1932 – December 1935)
- Chu Chia-hua Minister of Communications, Minister of Transportation (October 1932 – December 1935)
- Yu Feipeng (1935) (acting)
- Ku Meng-yu Minister of Railways (1932 - 1935), Minister of Transportation (1935 – 1937)
- Yu Feipeng (March 1937 – 1938)
- Chang Kia-ngau Minister of Railways (1935 -1938), Minister of Communications (1938 – 1942)
- Zeng Yangfu (December 1942 – February 1945)
- Yu Feipeng (February 1945 – May 1946)
- Yu Ta-wei (May 1946 - May 1948)

No.	Name	Term of office		Days	Party	Cabinet
1	Yu Ta-wei (俞大維)	31 May 1948	8 February 1949	253	Independent	Weng Wenhao; Sun Fo
—	Ling Hongxun (凌鴻勛)	8 February 1949	21 March 1949	41	Kuomintang	Sun Fo; He Yingqin
2	Duanmu Jie (端木傑)	21 March 1949	1 February 1950	317	Independent	He Yingqin; Yan Xishan
—	Yan Xishan (閻錫山)	18 December 1949	1 February 1950	45	Kuomintang	Yan Xishan
3	Chen Liang (陳良)	1 February 1950	15 March 1950	42	Kuomintang	Yan Xishan; Chen Cheng I
4	He Zhong-han (賀衷寒)	15 March 1950	1 June 1954	1539	Kuomintang	Chen Cheng I
5	Yuan Shou-chien (袁守謙)	1 June 1954	23 July 1960	2244	Kuomintang	Chen Cheng I Yu Hung-Chun; Chen Cheng II
6	Shen Yi (沈怡)	23 July 1960	11 December 1967	2697	Kuomintang	Chen Cheng II; Yen Chia-kan
7	Sun Yun-suan (孫運璿)	11 December 1967	11 October 1969	670	Kuomintang	Yen Chia-kan
8	Chang Chi-cheng (張繼正)	11 October 1969	1 June 1972	964	Kuomintang	Yen Chia-kan; Chiang Ching-kuo
9	Kao Yu-shu (高玉樹)	1 June 1972	11 June 1976	1471	Independent	Chiang Ching-kuo
10	Lin Chin-sheng (林金生)	11 June 1976	1 December 1981	1999	Kuomintang	Chiang Ching-kuo; Sun Yun-suan
11	Lien Chan (連戰)	1 December 1981	23 April 1987	1969	Kuomintang	Sun Yun-suan; Yu Kuo-hwa
12	Guo Nan-hung (郭南宏)	23 April 1987	1 June 1989	770	Kuomintang	Yu Kuo-hwa; Lee Huan
13	Clement Chang (張建邦)	1 June 1989	24 April 1991	692	Kuomintang	Lee Huan; Hau Pei-tsun
—	Ma Cheng-fang (馬鎮方)	24 April 1991	1 June 1991	38	Kuomintang	Hau Pei-tsun
14	Eugene Chien (簡又新)	1 June 1991	27 February 1993	637	Kuomintang	Hau Pei-tsun; Lien Chan
15	Liu Chao-shiuan (劉兆玄)	27 February 1993	10 June 1996	1199	Kuomintang	Lien Chan
16	Tsay Jaw-yang (蔡兆陽)	10 June 1996	1 April 1998	660	Kuomintang	Lien Chan; Vincent Siew
17	Lin Fong-cheng (林豐正)	1 April 1998	27 March 2000	726	Kuomintang	Vincent Siew
—	George Chen (陳世圯)	27 March 2000	20 May 2000	54	Kuomintang	Vincent Siew
18	Yeh Chu-lan (葉菊蘭)	20 May 2000	1 February 2002	622	Democratic Progressive Party	Tang Fei; Chang Chun-hsiung I
19	Lin Ling-san (林陵三)	1 February 2002	25 January 2006	1454	Democratic Progressive Party	Yu Shyi-kun; Frank Hsieh
20	Kuo Yao-chi (郭瑤琪)	25 January 2006	22 August 2006	209	Democratic Progressive Party	Su Tseng-chang I
21	Tsai Duei (蔡堆)	22 August 2006	20 May 2008	637	Kuomintang	Su Tseng-chang I Chang Chun-hsiung II
22	Mao Chi-kuo (毛治國)	20 May 2008	18 February 2013	1735	Kuomintang	Liu Chao-shiuan; Wu Den-yih; Chen Chun
23	Yeh Kuang-shih (葉匡時)	18 February 2013	13 January 2015	694	Kuomintang	Jiang Yi-huah; Mao Chi-kuo
—	Chen Jian-yu (陳建宇)	13 January 2015	24 January 2015	11	Independent	Mao Chi-kuo
24	Chen Jian-yu (陳建宇)	24 January 2015	20 May 2016	482	Independent	Mao Chi-kuo; Chang San-cheng
25	Hochen Tan (賀陳旦)	20 May 2016	16 July 2018	787	Independent	Lin Chuan; William Lai
26	Wu Hong-mo (吳宏謀)	16 July 2018	3 December 2018	140	Independent	William Lai
—	Wang Kwo-tsai (王國材)	4 December 2018	13 January 2019	40	Independent	William Lai
27	Lin Chia-lung (林佳龍)	14 January 2019	20 April 2021	827	Democratic Progressive Party	Su Tseng-chang II
28	Wang Kwo-tsai (王國材)	20 April 2021	20 May 2024	1126	Independent	Su Tseng-chang II; Chen Chien-jen
29	Lee Meng-yen (李孟諺)	20 May 2024	19 August 2024	91	Independent	Cho Jung-tai
—	Chen Yen-po (陳彥伯)	20 August 2024	1 September 2024	12	Independent	Cho Jung-tai
30	Chen Shih-kai (陳世凱)	2 September 2024	Incumbent	724	Democratic Progressive Party	Cho Jung-tai

== Access ==
The MOTC building is accessible by walking distance North West of Dongmen Station of the Taipei Metro on the Red Line.

== See also ==
- Transportation in Taiwan
- Ministry of Transport of the People's Republic of China
