= Yen Kuan-heng =

Taiwanese politician

Yen Kuan-heng MLY
- 顏寬恆
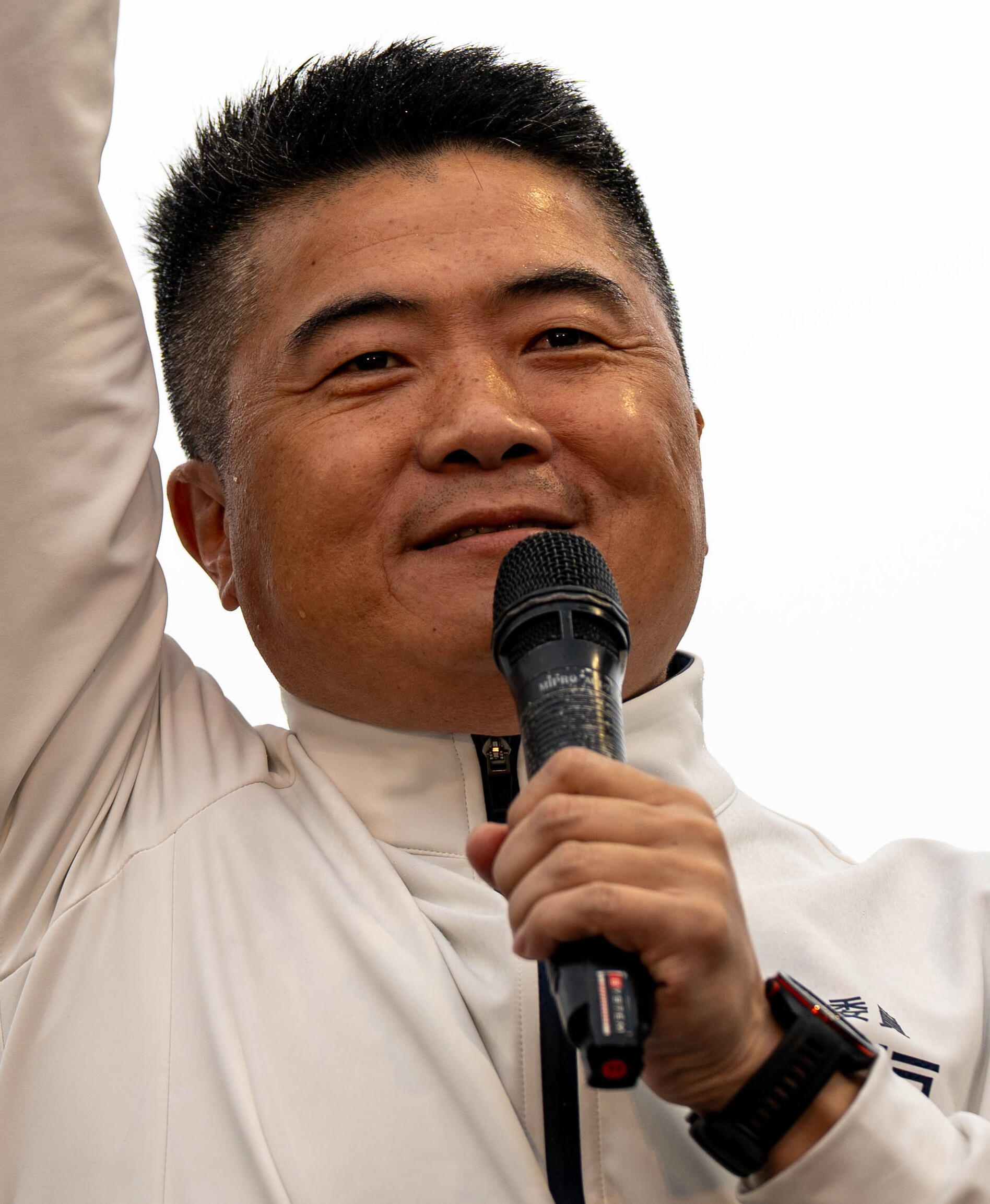
- Yen in 2025

Member of the Legislative Yuan
- Incumbent
- Assumed office 1 February 2024
- Preceded by: Lin Ching-yi
- Constituency: Taichung 2
- In office 1 February 2013 – 31 January 2020
- Preceded by: Yen Ching-piao
- Succeeded by: Chen Po-wei
- Constituency: Taichung 2

Personal details
- Born: 14 September 1977 (age 49) Shalu, Taichung, Taiwan
- Party: Kuomintang (since 2012)
- Parent: Yen Ching-piao (father)
- Relatives: Yen Li-ming (sister)
- Education: Chienkuo Technology University (BS); Chung Hua University (MPA); Dominican University of California (MBA)

Yen Kuan-heng (Chinese: 顏寬恆; pinyin: Yán Kuānhéng; born 14 September 1977) is a Taiwanese politician. He was elected to the Legislative Yuan from Taichung in 2013, to replace his father Yen Ching-piao in office. Yen lost reelection to Chen Po-wei in 2020, and returned to office in 2024.

== Education ==
Yen graduated from Chienkuo Technology University and earned a Master of Public Administration (M.P.A.) from Chung Hua University. He then completed graduate studies in the United States at the Dominican University of California, where he earned a Master of Business Administration (M.B.A.).

== Political career ==
Yen Kuan-heng helped run his father's first legislative campaign in 2001, and worked as the elder Yen's legislative assistant. Yen Ching-piao was sentenced to prison in November 2012 and expelled from the Legislative Yuan, necessitating a by-election for Taichung 2. Chen Shih-kai was named the Democratic Progressive Party candidate days before the Kuomintang announced its support of Yen Kuan-heng. The by-election was held on 26 January 2013, with Yen winning by 1,138 votes. The Kuomintang nominated Yen for a second term over fellow party member Chi Kuo-tung in the 2016 legislative elections, and Yen won again. In March 2016, Yen joined the Parliamentary Transparency Alliance, a smaller group of Kuomintang legislators within the Ninth Legislative Yuan. Yen narrowly lost reelection to Taiwan Statebuilding Party candidate Chen Po-wei in 2020. Following a successful bid to recall Chen from office in October 2021, a by-election was scheduled for 9 January 2022. The Kuomintang formally nominated Yen as its candidate for the by-election on 9 November 2021. French-born Taiwanese director Jean-Robert Thomann filmed the documentary Taiwan, Chronicle of a Threatened Democracy, about the by-election, which Yen lost to Lin Ching-yi. Yen unseated Lin in the 2024 legislative election.

During the 2021 by-election, Yen was investigated by the Taichung District Prosecutor’s Office, which found that his house in Shalu District was illegally built on state-owned land. The resulting probe additionally discovered that Yen had illicitly received NT$1.08 million in public funds, by having Lin Chin-fu claim to be Yen's legislative aide. In July 2024, the Taichung District Court found that Yen violated Article V of the Anti-Corruption Act, and was guilty of forgery, and sentenced him to a combined prison term of eight years and four months. The Taichung High Court ruled on Yen's appeal in September 2025, and upheld his sentence.
