= Yen Ching-piao =

Taiwanese politician (born 1960)

Yen Ching-piao MLY
- 顏清標
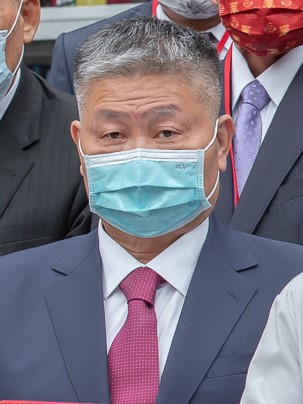
- Yen in April 2021

Member of the Legislative Yuan
- In office 1 February 2002 – 28 November 2012
- Succeeded by: Yen Kuan-heng
- Constituency: Taichung County→Taichung County 2→Taichung 2

Personal details
- Born: 25 August 1960 (age 66) Shalu, Taichung, Taiwan
- Party: Non-Partisan Solidarity Union (since 2004)
- Other political affiliations: Independent (2000–04); Kuomintang (until 2000)
- Children: 5; including Yen Kuan-heng

Yen Ching-piao (Chinese: 顏清標; pinyin: Yán Qīngbiāo; born 25 August 1960) is a Taiwanese politician.

== Personal life and early career ==
As a child, Yen Ching-piao earned the nickname "winter melon-piao" from his grandfather for his short stature and stocky build. Yen married at age 17, and had children, including son Yen Kuan-heng and daughter Yen Li-ming. Yen was linked to organized crime in 1986 and was imprisoned on Green Island for over three years. Upon his release, Yen was elected a borough leader, and, in 1994, was elected to the Taiwan Provincial Assembly, becoming the body's youngest member. He later served on the Taichung County Council, including a stint as speaker. Yen was expelled from the Kuomintang in April 2000, after having publicly backed James Soong's presidential campaign the previous month.

Yen assumed the chairmanship of the Dajia Jenn Lann Temple in January 1999, and used his position to push for direct travel from Taiwan to mainland China. He has become known for leading the Dajia Mazu Pilgrimage, a temple event often attended by politicians. Yen has also served as honorary chairman of the Taiwan Mazu Fellowship.

== Legislative service and later career ==
Yen was detained on 28 February 2001, while still serving as the speaker of the Taichung County Council. He was sentenced to twenty years imprisonment on 31 August 2001. Yen won a Taichung County legislative seat while serving a prison sentence for corruption, attempted murder, and firearms possession. While serving the sentence, Yen was also barred from leaving Taiwan, a restriction the Taiwan High Court refused to lift, even after Yen had been named to a delegation that was to visit Central America and the United States in April 2002. During his 2004 reelection campaign, Yen and other candidates filed an unsuccessful petition to change the election date from 11 December to 4 December. That year, Yen joined a formal political party for the first time after his expulsion from the Kuomintang, co-founding the Non-Partisan Solidarity Union and running as an NPSU candidate. In December, Yen's assistant Liu Sung-wu was taken in for questioning over electoral fraud, a charge Yen himself denied. Soon after winning reelection, Yen was named party caucus whip. His 2008 campaign, which featured heavy use of self-caricature, saw Yen win reelection against educator Lee Shun-liang. In his third term in the legislature, Yen opposed a proposal to specially designate Taoyuan International Airport as a separately administered entity unless Kaohsiung International Airport and Ching Chuan Kang Airport in his own constituency also received the designation. On 10 August 2008, Yen's office was the site of a shooting which injured two people.

The Taiwan High Court ruled in September 2011 that Yen was guilty of misusing public funds during his tenure on the Taichung County Council. He appealed to the Supreme Court, which upheld the lower court ruling in November 2012. Yen then spent most of January 2013 on the campaign trail, as his son had declared his candidacy to succeed the elder Yen to the Legislative Yuan. This arrangement attracted criticism, and following his son's electoral victory, Yen began serving a prison sentence of 42 months in February 2013. In June 2013 an amendment to the Accounting Act originally considered in 2012 was brought forward for further discussion. The amendment would have ended financial impropriety investigations into city and county council members, potentially shortening Yen Ching-piao's imprisonment because the offense he was jailed for occurred between 1998 and 2000, when he was a member of the Taichung County Council. The initiative failed unanimously, with three abstentions. Legislator Liao Cheng-ching proposed a bill that would not have applied to the terms of Yen's sentence in December 2013, but instead Yen applied for parole in June 2014, which was granted in four days.

He publicly supported Hau Lung-bin in the 2017 Kuomintang chairmanship election.
