= Chang Shan-chwen =

Taiwanese medical researcher

- 張上淳
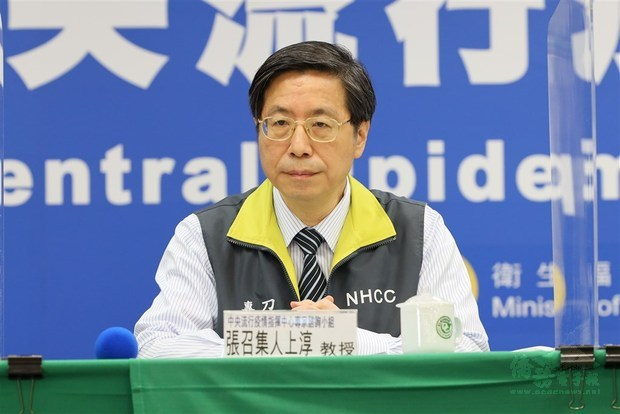
- Born: June 11, 1956 (age 70)
- Education: National Taiwan University (MD, PhD)
- Scientific career
- Fields: Internal medicine Infectiology
- Workplaces: National Taiwan University; Central Epidemic Command Center
- Thesis: Antimicrobial susceptibility and mechanism of antibiotic resistance in Methicillin-resistant Staphylococcus aureus (1992)
- Website: Chang's Faculty Page at National Taiwan University.

Chang Shan-chwen (Chinese: 張上淳; pinyin: Zhāng Shàngchún; born June 11, 1956) is a Taiwanese physician-scientist and academic administrator. He convenes the advisory specialist panel of the Central Epidemic Command Center (CECC), which is associated with the Centers for Disease Control in Taiwan. Chang Shan-chwen is vice president of National Taiwan University and professor of medicine in the university's medical college.

== Academic background ==
After graduating from Taipei Municipal Chien Kuo High School, Chang attended medical school at National Taiwan University, where he earned his Doctor of Medicine (M.D.) in 1981 and his Ph.D. in clinical medicine in 1992. His doctoral dissertation was titled, "Antimicrobial susceptibility and mechanism of antibiotic resistance in Methicillin-resistant Staphylococcus aureus".

Chang has previously held posts including chief of the Division of Infection, Immunology and Rheumatology within the Department of Internal Medicine at National Taiwan University Hospital; and dean of the National Taiwan University College of Medicine.

== COVID-19 pandemic in Taiwan ==
Chang regularly attended press conferences to provide updates about the coronavirus in Taiwan. He says that of the current confirmed cases in Taiwan, the symptoms are mainly fever, respiratory symptoms, and loss of olfactory taste.

He noted that the two groups most susceptible to coronavirus are students and members of tour groups. He has also said there has been an increasing numbers of confirmed COVID-19 infected patients with diarrhoea. He has noted that the CECC decided to expand screening to patients with pneumonia – hoping to detect those infected with COVID-19 more quickly and before they infect others. In March 2020, Chang helped to investigate one particularly mysterious domestic case of COVID-19.

Chang responded to questions about links between smoking and susceptibility to symptoms of the coronavirus, saying it is too early to draw conclusions. He has also pointed out that his colleagues have been communicating with The World Health Organization (WHO), which is taking a great interest in how Taiwan is dealing so effectively with the coronavirus.
