= 2009 swine flu pandemic in Taiwan =

2009 swine flu pandemic in Taiwan began on May 20, 2009, when a non-citizen who had been living in Taiwan returned from the United States via Hong Kong. By the end of September, more than 90% of influenza A detected in the community were Influenza A (H1N1).

== Initial response ==
After WHO raised the influenza pandemic phase to phase 4 on April 28, 2009, Taiwan established the Central Epidemic Command Center (CECC), and convened the first CECC meeting on the same day. Taiwan CDC also announced pandemic influenza A (H1N1) infection as category I notifiable disease which should be reported within 24 hours and all suspect patients should be hospitalized and isolated until the diagnosis was excluded. Besides routine fever screening, which has been in place since the SARS period in 2003, multiple border quarantine measures began on April 29 to delay the importation of the virus, as a result of meeting. On-board quarantine was performed on all flights came directly from the Americas and passengers were encouraged to report voluntarily to quarantine officers if they had flu-like symptoms. Through enhanced screening and quarantine, the first imported case was found when a 52-year-old foreign resident of Taiwan returned from the United States via Hong Kong on May 20. The man had been in the United States from February 20 to May 18 and was symptomatic on his flight back to Taiwan. He was sent to designated hospital directly from the airport, isolated, treated with oseltamivir and recovered fully. All passengers seated within three rows of the ill passenger were contacted, given chemoprophylaxis and quarantined. Quarantine on board discontinued on May 20, after the first case was found. In the following week, 9 more imported cases were found by fever screening in the airport. On May 24, the first domestic case that became infected with influenza A (H1N1) through close contact with an imported case was diagnosed. Because of enhanced contact tracing and prophylactic treatment, local transmission of the virus was stopped and no other domestic cases were found. Details of the control measures and clinical characteristics of the first 61 imported cases of pandemic influenza A (H1N1) has been published in the following article in Taiwan Epidemiology Bulletin.

== First cluster ==
Throughout the next few days, cases continued to be imported from abroad. On June 11, Taiwan Centers for Disease Control reported three cases imported from Thailand. Investigation found that some cases had been on a group tour in Thailand. More cases were found in these tour groups in the next few days. Thailand confirmed that the virus was found in a discothèque.

On 17 June 2009, it was known that a female diplomat working in Taiwan's Diplomatic Quarter had contracted the virus. The Ministry of Foreign Affairs was widely critiqued for trying to keep the outbreak hidden.

== Surveillance ==
Taiwan CDC has multiple surveillance systems (disease surveillance)to monitor the epidemic.

=== Complicated influenza ===
Influenza A (H1N1) was removed from list of Category I Notifiable Disease and was included in the list of Category IV and reported as influenza complications on June 19. All cases with influenza-like illness and pulmonary complications, neurological complications, myocarditis/pericarditis, invasive bacterial infection or those who needed intensive care or died because of the illness should be reported to Taiwan CDC within one week of diagnosis. The first case of complicated influenza was reported on July 17, 2009. The first mortality case was reported on July 30, 2009. The first case in pregnant woman was confirmed on August 15. From June 19, 2009, to January 23, 2010, 884 case of complicated pandemic (H1N1) 2009 virus infections were reported and confirmed, including 39 deaths. The mortality rate is around 2 per million population. Characteristics of the first 100 cases of complicated influenza can be found in the following article.

=== Virologic surveillance ===
Taiwan CDC's central lab and 10 contract labs are responsible for the virologic surveillance for seasonal and pandemic influenza. Soon after the start of the pandemic, Taiwan CDC developed its own diagnostic method for pandemic influenza A (H1N1), which is rapid, sensitive and specific. Six weeks after the first case of influenza A (H1N1) was imported, on July 2, it was confirmed that the virus was circulating in the communities. Pandemic influenza A (H1N1) had become the dominant community strain since the 30th week of 2009, and accounts for more than 90% of all influenza strains isolated. First Oseltamivir-resistant pandemic influenza A (H1N1) virus strain was discovered in October, 2009. Since June 1, 2009, more than 800 isolates were tested for oseltamivir resistance and 8 were found to be resistant. All resistant strains developed after oseltamivir treatment and there are no evidence of continuous transmission of these strains.

=== Outpatient surveillance ===
Taiwan CDC's database links with that of more than 300 hospitals all over the country. The number of patients diagnosed of influenza among all patients who visited the emergency department/outpatient department of these hospitals were calculated (ER/outpatient ILI consultation rate). According to the consultation rate, the first peak of influenza A(H1N1) infection in Taiwan was in the 36th week of 2009, followed by the second peak in the 48th week. The trend was going down since the beginning of 2010 and has remained low until now.

=== Pneumonia and influenza (P&I) mortality surveillance ===
Deaths reported through the National Death Certificate System mentioning P&I as the cause of death were calculated and compared to that of the previous influenza season. By the beginning of 2010, the number is below that for this time last year. The number of deaths mentioning P&I for age groups 0–49, 50–64, and greater than 65 years was the highest for adults greater than 65 years of age.

== Control measures ==
=== Antiviral stockpile ===
In addition to oseltamivir, CECC also procured zanamivir for the pandemic. The first shipment of stockpiled antivirals was released on August 29. All medication was paid by the National Health Insurance.

=== Medical care system ===
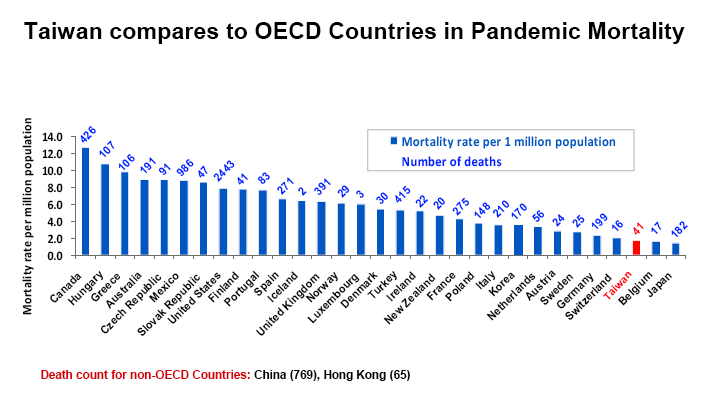
Taiwan compares to OECD Countries in Pandemic Mortality

On August 17, 2009, Taiwan CDC published the "Clinical Treatment Guideline for Influenza A(H1N1)", which is a result of collaborative work with the Infectious Diseases Society of Taiwan, Taiwan Pediatric Association, Nosocomial Infection Control Society of Taiwan and Taiwan Society of Pulmonary and Critical Care Medicine. Guidelines on diagnosis, treatment and control of nosocomial infection are included. According to the guideline, oseltamivir is suggested to be given to patients with influenza-like illness and a positive rapid influenza diagnostic test result, patients with complicated influenza and patients with high risk conditions as defined by the WHO. National Health Insurance, a compulsory social insurance system, is covering >98% of the population and contracting with >90% of the medical care institutions in Taiwan. Since August 15, 2009, oseltamivir can be prescribed free of charge in more than 3500 contracted clinics/hospitals for patients fulfilling the above criteria. Furthermore, the Taiwan Medical Association indicated that the doctors would help ease the load of patients by having clinics open on weekends.

=== Vaccination ===
On June 1, the CECC began the process to procure influenza A(H1N1) vaccine. As a result, 15 million doses of vaccine were bought from two manufacturers (Adimmune and Novartis), covering 60% of the population. Vaccine priority list was announced in August and mass vaccination began on November 1. Vaccinations were first given to targeted high risk groups, and to school aged children who are likely to spread the disease. Medical personnel were the first to be immunized. Data from a cross-national study showed that 76% of physicians in Taiwan have been vaccinated, which was the highest among all the physicians interviewed.

==== National Immunization Day ====
On December 12, 2009, vaccination was opened up to everyone. A large vaccination campaign was conducted to boost vaccination coverage. Vaccination stations were set up in hospitals, clinics, department stores and community gathering places. A total of 563,712 doses of vaccines (2.4% of population) were administered on that day. By the end of January 2010, approximately 24% of the total population have been immunized. To improve the accessibility of vaccination, phone lines set up by local health bureaus in cities and counties are open for the public to book a group appointment for pandemic influenza A (H1N1) vaccination. To prevent further spread of the virus in the coming 9-day holiday of the Lunar New Year, immunization stations were set up in airports and Taipei Station to vaccinate travellers since February 1, 2010.

==== Surveillance for adverse events following immunization ====
To ensure and safety and effectiveness of H1N1 vaccine, Taiwan CDC has passive and active surveillance system for vaccine adverse events. For passive surveillance, any adverse event happens after H1N1 immunization can be reported to local health bureau and Taiwan CDC. For active surveillance, vaccination record database is linked with the National Health Insurance database to ensure that the incidence of neurological diseases (such as Guillain–Barré syndrome), cardiovascular disease, adverse pregnancy outcome, stroke and anaphylaxis does not exceed the background incidence. By January 26, 2010, 1176 suspected vaccine-related adverse events have been reported, including 330 suspected serious adverse events and 35 deaths. Based on the number of vaccine doses administered, the incidence of adverse events and serious adverse events did not exceed the expected value. Vaccine Injury Compensation Program (VICP) committee is composed of a group of expert consultants with expertise in clinical medicine, pathology, sociology and law. It works independently from the government and is responsible for reviewing petitions requesting compensation for individuals thought to be injured by a vaccine. As of January 29, 2010, the VICP has received a total of 218 claims requesting compensation for individuals thought to be injured by the pandemic influenza A (H1N1) vaccine. VICP has completed reviewing 39 petitions. Five cases were ruled compensable (association is confirmed in one while association cannot be excluded in the other four) while the other thirty-four cases were ruled non-compensable.

=== School closures ===
In the beginning of the pandemic, the strategy was to contain the disease. During containment, one case was found in a school-aged child, resulting in the suspension of classes for the entire school. After school re-commenced in the fall, instead of closing the entire school, it was decided that only classrooms with two or more students with influenza in a 3-day period would have classes suspended for 5 days, which is the so-called 325 rule for class suspension. School-based vaccination program started on November 16, 2009, and half of the students in elementary or junior high school were vaccinated against flu by the end of November. Therefore, the rule for class suspension shifted from 325 to "814". Class suspension is no longer indicated, if >80% of the students in a class have been vaccinated for more than 2 weeks. The number of suspended classes reached its peak by the end of November, when more than 2000 classrooms were suspended daily all over Taiwan. However, because of successful school-based immunization program, less than 5 classrooms were suspended daily by the end of 2009.

== Mass communication ==
Taiwan CDC has multifacet strategies to communicate with the public, media and the medical personnels. Daily and weekly updates on the statistics of influenza A(H1N1) is available on the website. Important news about policy and current situation of the pandemic will be announced as press releases in routine news conference and on the website. Many celebrities, including Chien-Ming Wang, participated in H1N1 prevention campaign by shooting videos to urge the public to work as a team to stop H1N1. The 24/7 hotline of Taiwan CDC-1922, is an important channel of communication with the public. 1922 hotline deals with any inquiries related to communicable diseases such as reporting, diagnosis, consultation and referral. As the pandemic evolves, the number of incoming calls increased to more than 3000 per week. Many vaccine-related adverse events were reported via this hotline. It also provides first-hand information about how the policy is being executed. Since August 2009, CECC releases "E-Letter to doctors" to disseminate the latest information regarding diagnosis, treatment and policy making about influenza A(H1N1). By the end of 2009, 61 letters had been issued. More than 6000 doctors in Taiwan have subscribed.
