= Coronavirus in Taiwan =

Coronavirus in Taiwan may refer to:

- 2002–2004 SARS outbreak, coronavirus outbreak which affected Taiwan in 2003
- COVID-19 pandemic in Taiwan, coronavirus outbreak which affected Taiwan from 2020
