= CECC =

CECC may refer to:

- Central Epidemic Command Center, government agency of Taiwan
- Congressional-Executive Commission on China, independent agency of the United States government
