= Special Act for Prevention, Relief and Revitalization Measures for COVID-19 =

Health law related to the 2020 COVID-19 pandemic in Taiwan

Special Act for Prevention, Relief and Revitalization Measures for Severe Pneumonia with Novel Pathogens

Legislative Yuan
- Territorial extent: Free area of the Republic of China
- Enacted by: Legislative Yuan
- Enacted: 25 February 2020
- Effective: 15 January 2020 (retrospective)

Legislative history
- First reading: 21 February 2020
- Second reading: 25 February 2020
- Third reading: 25 February 2020

Summary
- To effectively prevent and control severe pneumonia with novel pathogens (COVID-19), protect the health of the people, and mitigate the impact of the disease on the domestic economy and society.
- Status: Current legislation

The Special Act for Prevention, Relief and Revitalization Measures for Severe Pneumonia with Novel Pathogens (Chinese: 嚴重特殊傳染性肺炎防治及紓困振興特別條例) is a law of the Republic of China (Taiwan) regulating response and relief efforts related to the COVID-19 pandemic in Taiwan.

== Proposal and passage ==
On 13 February 2020, the Executive Yuan proposed NT$60 billion in subsidies distributed to industries affected by the COVID-19 outbreak. Part of the funds were allocated under the provisions of the Disaster Prevention and Protection Act (災害防救法). Seven days later, on 20 February, the Executive Yuan passed a bill regarding further governmental response to the outbreak. Penalties for hoarding medical supplies, avoiding quarantine restrictions, and disseminating misinformation about COVID-19 were codified. The bill became law upon passing its third Legislative Yuan reading on 25 February 2020. The Special Act for Prevention, Relief and Revitalization Measures for Severe Pneumonia with Novel Pathogens took effect retroactively from 15 January 2020, and was fully implemented upon promulgation by the Tsai Ing-wen presidential administration on 25 February 2020. The Executive Yuan approved the special budget for COVID-19-related subsidies on 27 February. On 13 March, the coronavirus budget bill passed through the Legislative Yuan. Provisions of the COVID-19 budget bill were enforced by the Special Act for Prevention, Relief and Revitalization Measures for Severe Pneumonia with Novel Pathogens. Additionally, the special budget was exempted from Articles 62 and 63 of the Budget Act (預算法), permitting funds to be transferred amongst government agencies. Funds for the special budget are available for expenses relating to the COVID-19 pandemic incurred between 15 January 2020 and 30 June 2021.

On 2 April 2020, the Executive Yuan proposed an increase of NT$150 billion to the special budget for COVID-19 expenses, as part of an economic stimulus bill worth a total of NT$1.05 trillion. The increased budget ceiling passed the legislature on 21 April, and was raised to NT$210 billion. The budget was formally raised to a total of $NT210 billion in a bill passed on 8 May.

On 23 July 2020, the Executive Yuan proposed another increase, totaling NT$210 billion, to the COVID-19 special budget.

A fourth increase, adding NT$259.49 billion to the budget, was passed by the Legislative Yuan on 18 June 2021.

A request to extend the act for one year, without adding to its budget, was made by the Executive Yuan in April 2022.

== Background and content ==
During the 2002–2004 SARS outbreak the Provisional Act for Prevention and Relief of SARS was enacted. When the outbreak passed, the law was repealed. Applicable provisions were incorporated into the Communicable Disease Control Act, which regulates government actions during public health emergencies caused by communicable diseases. Following the SARS outbreak, questions remained regarding the constitutionality of Article 37, paragraph 1 of the Communicable Disease Control Act as amended in January 2002. In 2011, the Justices of the Constitutional Court issued Judicial Interpretation 609, which declared that particular section to be constitutional, and that it specifically did not violate Articles 8 or 23 of the Constitution of the Republic of China, which establish rights to due process and proportionality. The court held that all necessary measures or administrative dispositions including short-term detentions or quarantines were broadly delegated by the Communicable Disease Control Act.

The Special Act for Prevention, Relief and Revitalization Measures for Severe Pneumonia with Novel Pathogens enumerates compensation to medical professionals and medical institutions working during the pandemic, as well as to people in quarantine and their carers. The act also delineates penalties for those who do not comply with public health orders or with the terms of quarantine. People who engage in price gouging or the distribution of misinformation about the pandemic will face a fine or imprisonment.

=== Special budget ===
Of the NT$60 billion special budget approved in March 2020, NT$19.6 billion was set aside for disease prevention, such as expenses incurred by hospitals for screening and quarantining patients with coronavirus disease 2019. Roughly NT$16.9 billion was dispersed to the Ministry of Health and Welfare, which used the money to compensate medical professionals and research treatments for coronavirus disease 2019. The Ministry of Economic Affairs was awarded approximately NT$16 billion of the special budget, with which it planned to offer loans to small and medium-sized businesses, and contribute to the Small and Medium Enterprise Credit Guarantee Fund of Taiwan. Another NT$2 billion was set aside to stimulate the economy via the issuance of coupons for heavily affected industries. With its NT$16.85 billion share of the funds, the Ministry of Transportation and Communications aimed to compensate the aviation industry, as well as set up professional training opportunities for people in the tourism industry, such as travel agents, guides, and drivers.

Of the NT$150 million additional budget, NT133.5 billion was set aside for relief funds. This portion was designated for uses such as loans to businesses and financial hardship payments to individuals affected by the pandemic. Applications for such payments were open until 30 June 2020. The remaining NT$16.5 billion was added to disease prevention efforts. By September 2020, NT$161.1 billion had been allocated, primarily to the Ministry of Economic Affairs and the Ministry of Health and Welfare.

== Other actions ==
The Regulations Governing the Compensation for Periods of Isolation and Quarantine for Severe Pneumonia with Novel Pathogens (嚴重特殊傳染性肺炎隔離及檢疫期間防疫補償辦法), a directive regulating compensation paid to people under quarantine due to COVID-19 was promulgated on 10 March 2020.

Following the passage of the special act, Tsai Ing-wen convened a national security meeting on 12 March to discuss the economic impact of the pandemic.

== See also ==
- List of COVID-19 pandemic legislation
