= Su Ih-jen =

Taiwanese medical researcher

Su Ih-jen (Chinese: 蘇益仁; Wade–Giles: Su^{1} Yi^{4}-jen^{2}; born 1950) is a Taiwanese medical researcher and distinguished investigator who was the director of the Division of Infectious Diseases at the National Health Research Institutes in Taiwan.

== Early career ==
Su received his MD degree from National Taiwan University Medical School in 1976, and PhD in pathology in 1987. His research focus is on virus and virus-associated human cancers. He co-authored SARS in Taiwan: an overview and lessons learned, published by The International Journal of Infectious Diseases, which aimed to describe the epidemiology of SARS in Taiwan between March and July 2003, along with the public health response. He has published more than 200 papers in journals including The Lancet, Blood, Journal of Clinical Investigation, and The American Journal of Pathology. He was a speaker at the 4th International Conference and Exhibition on Metabolomics & Systems Biology in 2015.

Through 2002, Su taught at National Taiwan University Medical School, while also directing the National Health Research Institutes' Division of Clinical Research. Following his tenure as director of the Centers for Disease Control, Su returned to the NHRI clinical research division, then subsequently served as director of the National Institute of Infectious Diseases and Vaccinology, another NHRI division. Su was formerly distinguished professor, Department of Biotechnology, Southern Taiwan University of Science and Technology, and has also taught at National Cheng Kung University. At Cheng Kung, Su concurrently served as deputy superintendent of the National Cheng Kung University Hospital.

== SARS in Taiwan ==
Su was appointed director of the Centers for Disease Control in May 2003, in the midst of the 2002–2004 SARS outbreak. He announced his resignation from the position in January 2004, but remained in the post until May 2004. Following the outbreak, Su began annual rehearsals of a possible pandemic from China after SARS killed over 20 percent of people infected by it in Taiwan. During the SARS epidemic, he developed methodologies to reduce viral load among patients in hospital wards. He stated that the exclusion of Taiwanese medical experts from international meetings during the SARS epidemic hampered prevention efforts.

== COVID-19 pandemic ==
Su stated of the COVID-19 pandemic in Taiwan, "The situation in [Western] countries now resembles the situation we were in during the first few weeks of the SARS spread in Taiwan in early 2003". He noted the drastically different mood in Taiwan regarding the pandemic, compared with the general sense of confusion and panic present in Europe and the United States. Su attributed these differences to Taiwan's quick reactions to COVID-19. Taiwan acknowledged it as a major threat – when other countries did not – and employed an effective strategy of distributing testing quickly to the public.

In the early days of the coronavirus outbreak, Su urged Taiwan's health authorities to send an investigation team to Wuhan. When members of the Australian media went to Taiwan and interviewed Su, he told them not to trust the accuracy of data from China or the World Health Organization (WHO). He told them that data from WHO lags behind the real situation. Some reports confirm that China has not been providing accurate data, with new estimates suggest Wuhan's death toll may have been 10 times higher than officially reported.

Su believed that as the epidemic develops, the symptoms may diversify – such as diarrhea or neurosensory abnormalities. As a strategy for dealing with COVID-19, he is against attempting to develop herd immunity and describes it as a 'last resort'.

He expressed concerns about the potential for viruses to escape as a result of human error from research laboratories, including a facility in Taiwan.
