= Taiwan Centers for Disease Control =

Government agency of Taiwan

Centers for Disease Control
- 疾病管制署
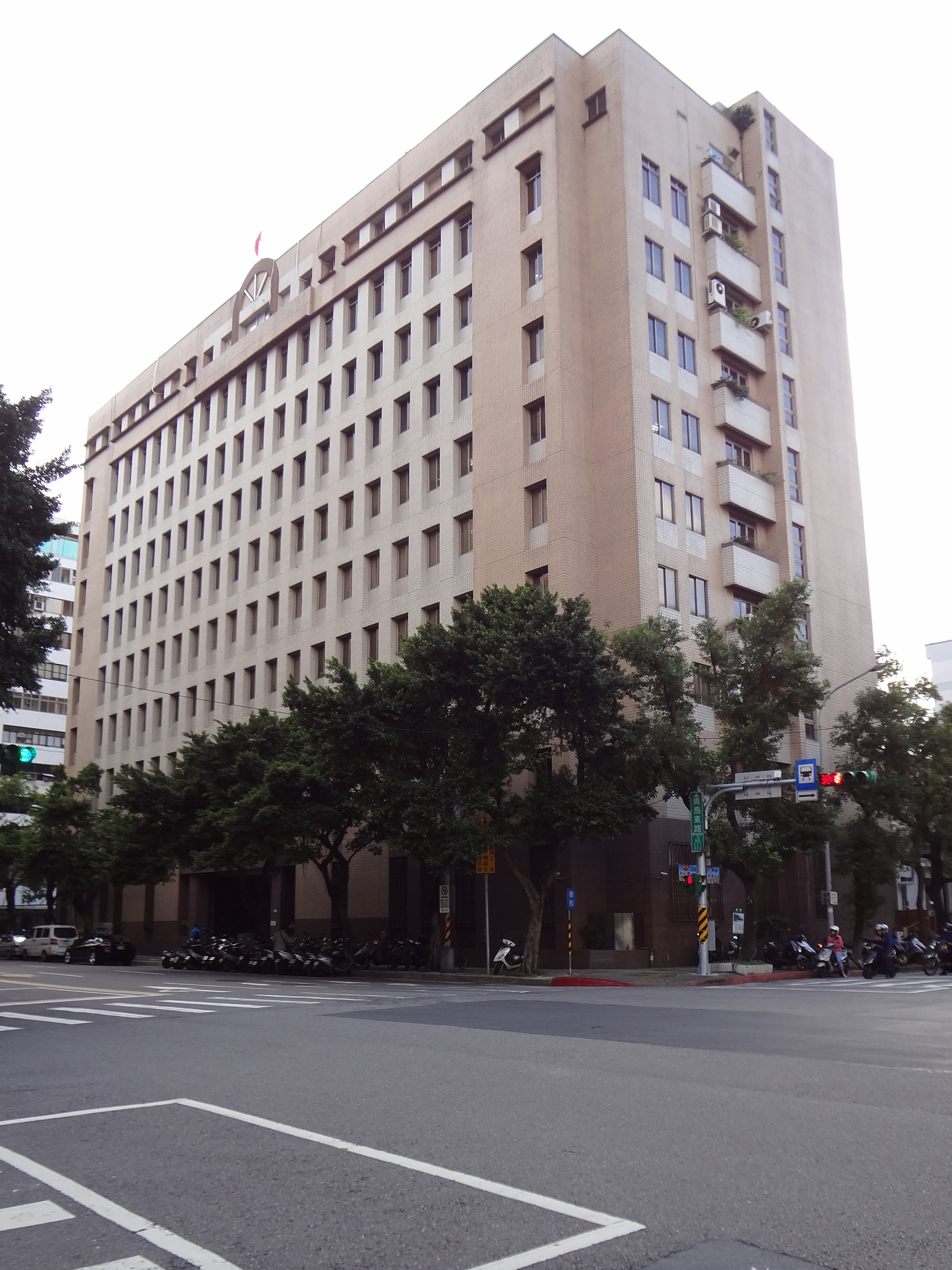

Agency overview
- Formed: 1 July 1999
- Jurisdiction: Taiwan
- Headquarters: Zhongzheng, Taipei, Taiwan
- Agency executive: Lo I-Chun, Director-General
- Parent agency: Ministry of Health and Welfare
- Website: Official website

The Taiwan Centers for Disease Control (CDC; Chinese: 衛生福利部疾病管制署; pinyin: Wèishēng Fúlì Bù Jíbìng Guǎnzhì Shǔ; Pe̍h-ōe-jī: Ōe-seng Hok-lī Pō͘ Chi̍t-pēⁿ Koán-chè Sú) is the national public health agency of the Republic of China (Taiwan). It is a subagency of the Ministry of Health and Welfare.

== History ==
The agency was established on 1 July 1999.

=== Timeline of early warning for COVID-19 ===
TCDC officials saw premonitions of the COVID-19 pandemic in December on social media. As well, medical staff freely transit the Taiwan Strait, so the TCDC was dimly aware that something was awry in December. On 31 December, Wuhan city government stamped paper that required doctors in the city to report all cases of a novel pneumonia to them. On 1 January, the Huanan Seafood City market (HSCM) was shuttered by the health authorities.

By 5 January 2020, the Taiwan CDC began monitoring all individuals who had travelled to Wuhan within fourteen days and exhibited a fever or symptoms of upper respiratory tract infections. These people were screened for 26 known pathogens, including SARS and Middle East respiratory syndrome, and those testing positive were quarantined.

Chuang Yin-ching recounted that "TCDC made a request to the Chinese health authority on 6 January. I was notified on 11 January. I remember that day very clearly because that was the Taiwan presidential election day. Around 6 pm in the afternoon I got a phone call from the director general of the Taiwan CDC that (I and a colleague) had permission to go to Wuhan. We flew there the next night for a meeting on 13 and 14 January morning and afternoon in Wuhan."

On 15 January, Chuang and his colleague were summoned to the Director-General of the TCDC. The next morning he was present at the expert task force meeting. This was followed by a press conference on 16 January.

On 20 January 2020, the CECC was activated.

== Central Epidemic Command Center (CECC) ==
The Central Epidemic Command Center, division of the National Health Command Center, is activated by the government of Taiwan for several disease outbreaks, as the 2009 swine flu pandemic and the COVID-19 pandemic.

The CECC has the authority to coordinate works across government departments and enlist additional personnel during an emergency.

== Notable personnel ==
- Chuang Yin-ching, commander of the Communicable Disease Control Medical Network
- Ih-Jen Su, director-general (2003–2005)
- Twu Shiing-jer, director-general (2000–2002)

== Centers ==
- Taipei Regional Center
- Northern Regional Center
- Central Regional Center
- Eastern Regional Center
- Southern Regional Center
- Kaohsiung-Pingtung Regional Center

== Methadone program ==
The agency subsidizes a methadone maintenance treatment program in Taiwan. This includes providing methadone for addicts as well as providing psychiatrists, nurses, and case works, additionally the program "also provides educational programs for specific patients who were under conditions of deferred prosecution."

== See also ==
- Healthcare in Taiwan
