= Legislative Yuan constituencies in Changhua County =

Changhua County
- 4 Single-member constituency for the Legislative Yuan
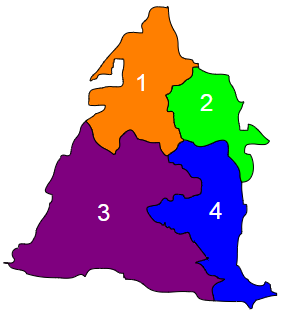
- Map of Changhua legislative districts
- District(s): Changhua County
- Electorate: 1,031,222

Current constituency
- Created: 2008
- Number of members: 4

Changhua County legislative districts (Chinese: 彰化縣選舉區) consist of 4 single-member constituencies, each represented by a member of the Republic of China Legislative Yuan.

== Current districts ==
- Changhua County Constituency 1 - Shengang, Xianxi, Hemei, Lukang, Fuxing, Xiushui Townships
- Changhua County Constituency 2 - Huatan, Fenyuan Townships, Changhua City
- Changhua County Constituency 3 - Fangyuan, Erlin, Puyan, Xihu, Puxin, Dacheng, Zhutang, Pitou, Beidou, Xizhou Townships
- Changhua County Constituency 4 - Dacun, Yongjing, Shetou, Tianwei, Tianzhong, Ershui Townships, Yuanlin City

== Legislators ==
Kuomintang Democratic Progressive Party

Election	Changhua County 1	Changhua County 2	Changhua County 3	Changhua County 4
2008 7th	Chen Hsiu-ching	Lin Tsang-min	Cheng Ru-fen	Hsiao Ching-tien
2012 8th	Wang Huei-mei (2012-2018)^{2}	Lin Tsang-min	Cheng Ru-fen	Wei Ming-ku (2012-2014)^{1}
2015	Wang Huei-mei (2012-2018)^{2}	Lin Tsang-min	Cheng Ru-fen	Chen Su-yueh
2016 9th	Wang Huei-mei (2012-2018)^{2}	Huang Hsiu-fang	Hung Tsung-yi	Chen Su-yueh
2019	Ko Cheng-fang	Huang Hsiu-fang	Hung Tsung-yi	Chen Su-yueh
2020 10th	Chen Hsiu-pao	Huang Hsiu-fang	Hsieh Yi-fong	Chen Su-yueh
2024 11th	Chen Hsiu-pao	Huang Hsiu-fang	Hsieh Yi-fong	Chen Su-yueh

Wei Ming-ku resigned in 2014 after elected Changhua County magistrate.

Wang Huei-mei resigned in 2018 after elected Changhua County magistrate.
