= Chen Su-yueh =

Taiwanese politician

Chen Su-yueh MLY
- 陳素月
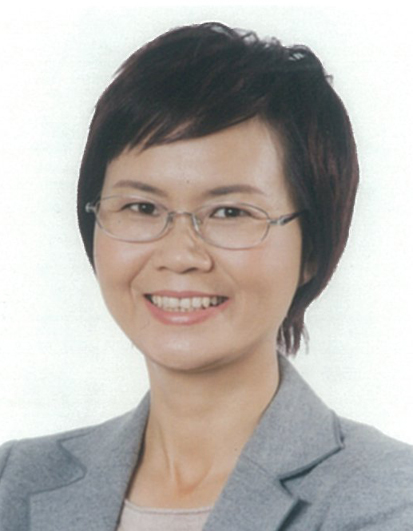

Member of the Legislative Yuan
- Incumbent
- Assumed office 16 February 2015
- Preceded by: Wei Ming-ku
- Constituency: Changhua 4

Member of the Changhua County Council
- In office 1 March 2006 – 24 December 2014

Personal details
- Born: 18 January 1966 (age 60) Nantou County, Taiwan
- Party: Democratic Progressive Party
- Education: Chinese Culture University (BA, MA)

Chen Su-yueh (Chinese: 陳素月; born 18 January 1966) is a Taiwanese politician. She served on the Changhua County Council from 2006 to 2014, then she won a by-election and succeeded Wei Ming-ku as a member of the Legislative Yuan in 2015.

== Education and early career ==
Chen attended primary and middle school in Nantou County, subsequently graduating from Taichung Municipal Taichung Girls' Senior High School. She earned an undergraduate degree in history at Chinese Culture University and remained at CCU, where she earned a master's degree in the subject. She has held lecturer posts at Dayeh University and National Open University.

== Political career ==
Chen has served as a representative to the Democratic Progressive Party National Congress, and as legislative assistant to Wei Ming-ku. From 2006 to 2014, she was a member of the Changhua County Council. While on the county council, she called for a "crude and ill-made" statue portraying fruit placed in Yuanlin to be removed. Chen contested the 2015 legislative by-election in Changhua and defeated Cho Po-yuan. She took office on 16 February 2015, and served out the rest of Wei Ming-ku's legislative term. Chen won her first full term in January 2016. In September 2016, Chen attended a rally opposing a permit renewal for a power plant in Changhua owned by Formosa Chemicals and Fibre Corp. The next month, Chen and fellow lawmakers Hung Tsung-yi and Huang Hsiu-fang expressed support for Wei Ming-ku, who, in his capacity as Changhua County magistrate, chose not to renew those permits. She was also active in discussions on local and telecommunications infrastructure. Chen ran for reelection in 2020, and won a second full term that January. In May 2020, Chen expressed support for an amendment to the Road Traffic Management and Penalty Act, raising fines on truck drivers who do not adequately secure cargo. Appearing alongside Michelle Lin in May 2021, Chen backed Lin in calling for international drivers' licenses issued by the Ministry of Transportation and Communications to include Taiwan on the document. In August 2021, Chen pushed the government to expand relief programs due to the continuing COVID-19 pandemic, calling for childcare centers, kindergartens, and cram schools to remain eligible for vouchers, despite the end of the Triple Stimulus Voucher program, which had included these services. In November 2021, Chen and Lin called attention to social media scams, stating that the National Communications Commission needed to "muster the courage" and enforce regulations on Facebook Marketplace and other social media platforms.
