= Jeffery Bruce =

Jeffery Bruce may refer to the following:

- Ja Rule (Jeffrey Bruce Atkins; born 1976), American rapper
- Jeffrey Bruce Jacobs (1943–2019), American-born Australian orientalist
- Jeffrey Bruce Klein (1948–2025), American investigative journalist
- Jeffrey Bruce Paris (born 1944), British mathematician
