= Chen Szu-yu =

Chen Szu-yu is the name of:

- Chen Szu-yu (table tennis) (born 1993), Taiwanese female table tennis player
- Chen Szu-yu (badminton) (born 1994), Taiwanese female badminton player

== See also ==
- Chen Si-yu (born 1986), Taiwanese politician who is the independent candidate in Taipei City Constituency 2, 2019 Taiwanese legislative by-elections, now she joined the Taiwan People's Party (TPP).
