= Changhua County Constituency 4 =

Constituency of the Legislative Yuan of Taiwan

- Single-member constituency for the Legislative Yuan
- District(s): Dacun, Yongjing, Shetou, Tianwei, Tianzhong, Changhua, Ershui, Yuanlin
- Electorate: 264,830 (2024 election)

Current constituency
- Created: 2008
- Party: DPP
- Member: Chen Su-yueh

Changhua County Constituency 4 (Chinese: 彰化縣第四選舉區) is one of the 73 regional constituencies represented in the Legislative Yuan, the national legislature of Taiwan. It was created in 2008 following a series of constitutional reforms, and elects one legislator, through first-past-the-post voting, to the Legislative Yuan. It has been represented by Chen Su-yueh of the Democratic Progressive Party since 2015.

== Legislators ==
| Election | Legislator | Party |
|---|---|---|
| 2008 - 2012 | Hsiao Ching-tien | Kuomintang |
| 2012 - 2015 | Wei Ming-ku | Democratic Progressive Party |
| 2015 | Chen Su-yueh | Democratic Progressive Party |

== Election results ==

=== 2008 ===
2008 Taiwanese legislative election: Changhua 4
| Candidate | Party | Votes | % |
|---|---|---|---|
| Hsiao Ching-tien | Kuomintang | 60,980 | 41.26 |
| Chiang Chao-yi | Democratic Progressive Party | 54,808 | 37.09 |
| Cheng Chao-jung | Independent | 20,690 | 14.00 |
| Hsieh Chang-chieh | Independent | 11,302 | 7.65 |
| Total | | 147,780 | 100.00 |
| Valid votes | | 147,780 | 98.24 |
| Invalid/blank votes | | 2,652 | 1.76 |
| Total votes | | 150,432 | 100.00 |
| Registered voters/turnout | | 252,437 | 59.59 |
| Majority | | 6,172 | 4.17 |
| Kuomintang win (new seat) | | | |

=== 2012 ===
* denotes the incumbent legislator

2012 Taiwanese legislative election: Changhua 4
| Candidate | Party | Votes | % | +/– |
|---|---|---|---|---|
| Wei Ming-ku | Democratic Progressive Party | 92,085 | 50.24 | ▲13.15 |
| Hsiao Ching-tien* | Kuomintang | 91,207 | 49.76 | ▲8.50 |
| Total | | 183,292 | 100.00 | – |
| Valid votes | | 183,292 | 97.20 | |
| Invalid/blank votes | | 5,273 | 2.80 | |
| Total votes | | 188,565 | 100.00 | |
| Registered voters/turnout | | 257,151 | 73.33 | |
| Majority | | 878 | 0.48 | |
| Democratic Progressive Party gain from Kuomintang | | | | |

=== 2015 by-election ===
Called after incumbent legislator Wei Ming-ku resigned to run for Changhua Magistrate.

2015 Taiwanese legislative by-elections: Changhua 4
| Candidate | Party | Votes | % | +/– |
|---|---|---|---|---|
| Chen Su-yueh | Democratic Progressive Party | 51,907 | 53.61 | ▲3.37 |
| Cho Po-yuan | Kuomintang | 34,707 | 35.84 | ▼13.92 |
| Hung Li-na | Independent | 9,774 | 10.09 | NEW |
| Chang Chun-nan | Independent | 443 | 0.46 | NEW |
| Total | | 96,831 | 100.00 | – |
| Valid votes | | 96,831 | 99.22 | |
| Invalid/blank votes | | 766 | 0.78 | |
| Total votes | | 97,597 | 100.00 | |
| Registered voters/turnout | | 259,816 | 37.56 | |
| Majority | | 17,200 | 17.77 | |
| Democratic Progressive Party hold | | | | |

=== 2016 ===
* denotes the incumbent legislator

2016 Taiwanese legislative election: Changhua 4
| Candidate | Party | Votes | % | +/– |
|---|---|---|---|---|
| Chen Su-yueh* | Democratic Progressive Party | 95,518 | 57.24 | ▲3.63 |
| Chang Chin-kun | Kuomintang | 71,367 | 42.76 | ▲6.92 |
| Total | | 166,885 | 100.00 | – |
| Valid votes | | 166,885 | 97.58 | |
| Invalid/blank votes | | 4,141 | 2.42 | |
| Total votes | | 171,026 | 100.00 | |
| Registered voters/turnout | | 260,906 | 65.55 | |
| Majority | | 24,151 | 14.48 | |
| Democratic Progressive Party hold | | | | |

=== 2020 ===
* denotes the incumbent legislator

2020 Taiwanese legislative election: Changhua 4
| Candidate | Party | Votes | % | +/– |
|---|---|---|---|---|
| Chen Su-yueh* | Democratic Progressive Party | 103,740 | 53.42 | ▼3.82 |
| Hsiao Ching-tien | Kuomintang | 78,603 | 40.48 | ▼2.28 |
| Hsiao Tsui-ying | Green Party Taiwan | 3,831 | 1.97 | NEW |
| Chen Chih-chieh | Stabilizing Force Party | 2,913 | 1.50 | NEW |
| Lin I-wen | Labor Party (Note: Not affiliated with Labor Party (Taiwan)) | 2,451 | 1.26 | NEW |
| Hung Yu-fu | Independent | 1,507 | 0.78 | NEW |
| Ho Pei-erh | Labor Party | 1,138 | 0.59 | NEW |
| Total | | 194,183 | 100.00 | – |
| Valid votes | | 194,183 | 97.76 | |
| Invalid/blank votes | | 4,451 | 2.24 | |
| Total votes | | 198,634 | 100.00 | |
| Registered voters/turnout | | 263,751 | 75.31 | |
| Majority | | 25,137 | 12.94 | |
| Democratic Progressive Party hold | | | | |

=== 2024 ===
* denotes the incumbent legislator

2024 Taiwanese legislative election: Changhua 4
| Candidate | Party | Votes | % | +/– |
|---|---|---|---|---|
| Chen Su-yueh* | Democratic Progressive Party | 97,608 | 52.01 | ▼1.41 |
| Cheng Chun-hsiung | Kuomintang | 83,214 | 44.34 | ▲3.86 |
| Cheng Hsi-mao | MiLinguall Party | 4,257 | 2.27 | NEW |
| Tsai Nien-chen | Chinese Culture Republican Party | 2,583 | 1.38 | NEW |
| Total | | 187,662 | 100.00 | – |
| Valid votes | | 187,662 | 97.03 | |
| Invalid/blank votes | | 5,749 | 2.97 | |
| Total votes | | 193,411 | 100.00 | |
| Registered voters/turnout | | 264,830 | 73.03 | |
| Majority | | 14,394 | 7.67 | |
| Democratic Progressive Party hold | | | | |
