= Taichung City Constituency 6 =

Constituency of the Legislative Yuan of Taiwan

- Single-member constituency for the Legislative Yuan
- District(s): Central, South, East, West
- Electorate: 273,367 (2024 election)

Current constituency
- Created: 2008 (as Taichung City Constituency 3); 2010 (current name)
- Party: KMT
- Member: Lo Ting-wei

Taichung City Constituency 6 (Chinese: 臺中市第六選舉區) is one of the 73 regional constituencies represented in the Legislative Yuan, the national legislature of Taiwan. It was created in 2008 (as Taichung City Constituency 3) following a series of constitutional reforms, and elects one legislator, through first-past-the-post voting, to the Legislative Yuan. It has been represented by Lo Ting-wei of the Kuomintang since 2024.

== Legislators ==
Election	Legislator	Party
2008 - 2012	Daniel Hwang	Kuomintang
2012 - 2015	Lin Chia-lung	Democratic Progressive Party
2015 - 2021	Huang Kuo-shu	Democratic Progressive Party
2021 - 2024	Huang Kuo-shu	Independent
2024	Lo Ting-wei	Kuomintang

== Election results ==

=== 2008 (Note: Named Taichung City Constituency 3, boundaries unchanged) ===
2008 Taiwanese legislative election: Taichung City 3
Candidate	Party	Votes	%
Daniel Hwang	Kuomintang	76,209	54.91
Ho Min-hao	Democratic Progressive Party	59,969	43.21
Ho Tzu-hua	Independent	1,673	1.21
Lin Chen-tung	Democratic Liberal Party	611	0.44
Wang Ming-chiang	The Great Way of Compassion and Salvation	322	0.23
Total		138,784	100.00
Valid votes		138,784	98.61
Invalid/blank votes		1,954	1.39
Total votes		140,738	100.00
Registered voters/turnout		236,692	59.46
Majority		16,240	11.7
Kuomintang win (new seat)			

=== 2012 ===
* denotes the incumbent legislator

2012 Taiwanese legislative election: Taichung City 6
Candidate	Party	Votes	%	+/–
Lin Chia-lung	Democratic Progressive Party	96,685	51.78	▲8.57
Daniel Hwang*	Kuomintang	84,937	45.49	▼9.42
Ho Tzu-hua	Independent	2,307	1.24	▲0.03
Tseng Kun-ping	National Health Service Alliance	1,322	0.71	NEW
Tsai Ho-hsing	Independent	607	0.33	NEW
Wang Ming-chiang	Taiwan Basic Laws Party	507	0.27	NEW
Lin Hsing-chieh	Independent	354	0.19	NEW
Total		186,719	100.00	–
Valid votes		186,719	98.71	
Invalid/blank votes		2,433	1.29	
Total votes		189,152	100.00	
Registered voters/turnout		248,462	76.13	
Majority		11,748	6.29	
Democratic Progressive Party gain from Kuomintang				

=== 2015 by-election ===
Called after incumbent legislator Lin Chia-lung resigned to run for Taichung Mayor.

2015 Legislative Yuan by-election: Taichung City 6
Candidate	Party	Votes	%	+/–
Huang Kuo-shu	Democratic Progressive Party	45,143	57.83	▲6.05
Hsiao Chia-chi	Kuomintang	32,917	42.17	▼3.32
Total		78,060	100.00	–
Valid votes		78,060	99.45	
Invalid/blank votes		435	0.55	
Total votes		78,495	100.00	
Registered voters/turnout		255,203	30.76	
Majority		12,226	15.66	
Democratic Progressive Party hold				

=== 2016 ===
* denotes the incumbent legislator

2016 Taiwanese legislative election: Taichung City 6
Candidate	Party	Votes	%	+/–
Huang Kuo-shu*	Democratic Progressive Party	95,725	55.74	▼2.09
Shen Chih-hui	Kuomintang	69,611	40.53	▼1.64
Ho Tzu-hua	Independent	6,396	3.72	NEW
Total		171,732	100.00	–
Valid votes		171,732	98.31	
Invalid/blank votes		2,961	1.69	
Total votes		174,693	100.00	
Registered voters/turnout		258,303	67.63	
Majority		26,114	15.21	
Democratic Progressive Party hold				

=== 2020 ===
* denotes the incumbent legislator

2020 Taiwanese legislative election: Taichung City 6
Candidate	Party	Votes	%	+/–
Huang Kuo-shu*	Democratic Progressive Party	113,128	55.91	▲0.17
Li Chung	Kuomintang	80,478	39.78	▼0.75
Yang Mu-lan	Independent	4,278	2.11	NEW
Wu Kuang-chung	People First Party	3,882	1.92	NEW
Hung Wei-fu	Interfaith Union	558	0.28	NEW
Total		202,324	100.00	–
Valid votes		202,324	98.30	
Invalid/blank votes		3,491	1.70	
Total votes		205,815	100.00	
Registered voters/turnout		268,406	76.68	
Majority		32,650	16.13	
Democratic Progressive Party hold				

=== 2024 ===
2024 Taiwanese legislative election: Taichung City 6
Candidate	Party	Votes	%	+/–
Lo Ting-wei	Kuomintang	103,630	52.10	▲12.32
Chiang Chao-kuo	Democratic Progressive Party	88,674	44.58	▼11.33
Ho Tzu-hua	Independent	2,972	1.49	NEW
Huang Chien-ting	Chinese Unification Promotion Party	2,091	1.05	NEW
Chi Wen-ching	Independent	1,532	0.77	NEW
Total		198,899	100.00	–
Valid votes		198,899	97.94	
Invalid/blank votes		4,191	2.06	
Total votes		203,090	100.00	
Registered voters/turnout		273,367	74.29	
Majority		14,956	7.52	
Kuomintang gain from Democratic Progressive Party				
