= Lisa Huang =

Taiwanese lawyer and politician

Huang Wen-ling MLY
- 黃文玲
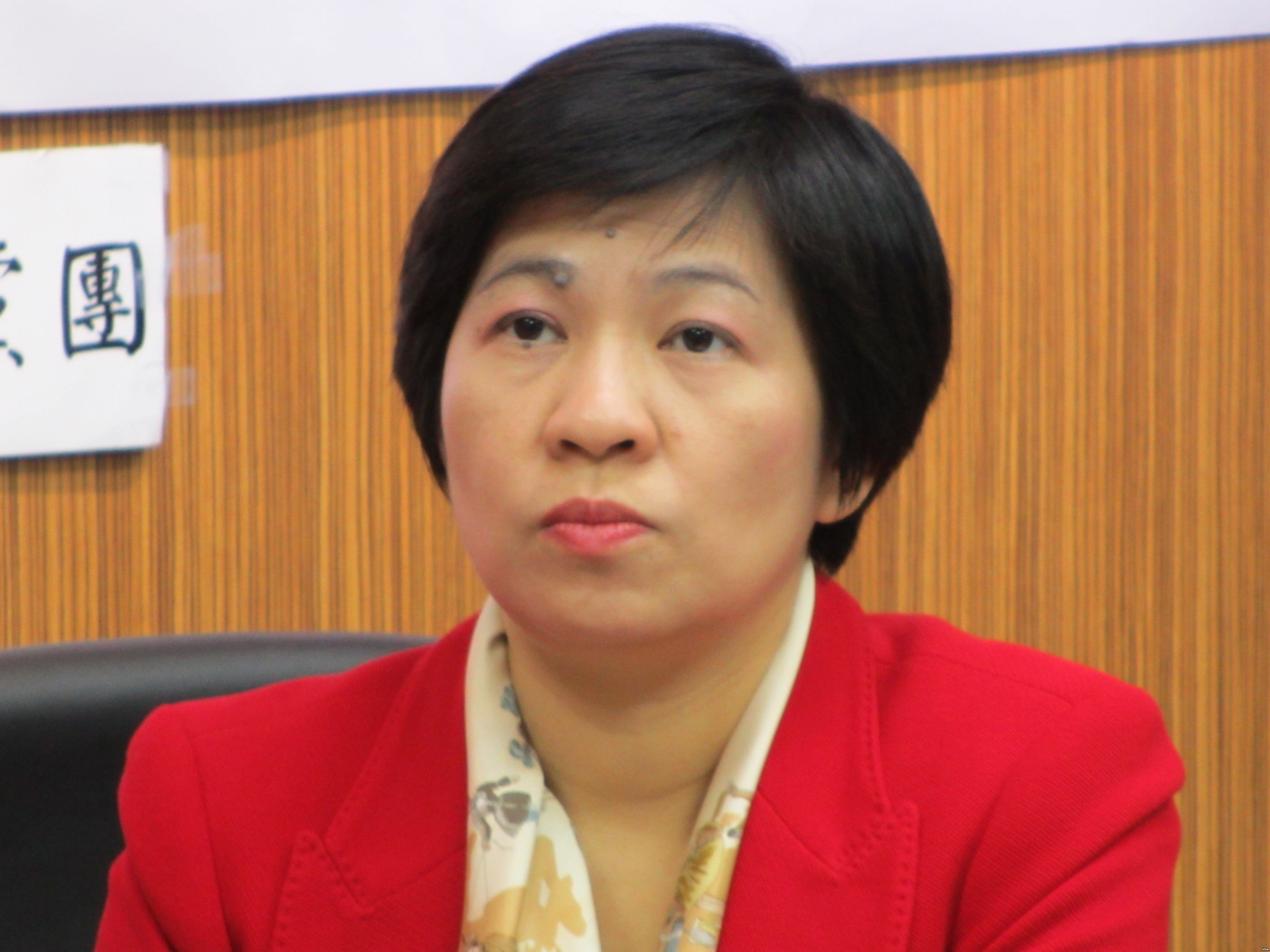
- Huang in October 2012

Member of the Legislative Yuan
- In office 1 February 2012 – 31 January 2014
- Succeeded by: Lai Chen-chang
- Constituency: Republic of China

Personal details
- Born: 11 August 1969 (age 57) Changhua, Taiwan
- Party: Independent
- Other political affiliations: Taiwan Solidarity Union (2011–14)
- Parent: George Huang (father)
- Education: Soochow University (LLB); National Chiao Tung University (MBA)
- Profession: Lawyer

Huang Wen-ling (Chinese: 黃文玲; born 11 August 1969), also known by her English name Lisa Huang, is a Taiwanese lawyer and politician. She served on the Legislative Yuan between 2012 and 2014.

== Early life and education ==
Huang was born in Changhua on August 11, 1969. She is the daughter of politician George Huang. Her brother, David, is a political scientist.

After high school, Huang studied law at Soochow University and graduated with a Bachelor of Laws (LL.B.) degree. She then earned a Master of Business Administration (M.B.A.) from National Chiao Tung University.

== Political career ==
Prior to her career in politics, Huang worked as a lawyer based in Changhua.

=== Electoral history ===
Huang first ran for the legislature as an independent candidate in Changhua County during the 2004 elections, but did not win. In 2011, she was named to the Legislative Yuan as a member of the Taiwan Solidarity Union via party list proportional representation. The TSU had previously announced that representatives elected via the party list would serve only two-year terms, and as a result, Huang was replaced by Lai Chen-chang in 2014. She then became the TSU's Judiciary Reform Committee director and was in discussion to represent the party as candidate for Changhua County Magistrate later that year. She registered as an independent instead, was expelled from the Taiwan Solidarity Union, and lost the office to Wei Ming-ku. In 2018, Huang contested the Changhua magistracy for a second time, again as an independent.

==== 2018 Changhua County magistrate election ====
2018 Changhua County mayoral results
No.	Candidate	Party	Votes	Percentage
1	Wei Ming-ku	Democratic Progressive Party	283,269	39.87%
2	Wang Huei-mei	Kuomintang	377,795	53.18%
3	Pai Ya-tsan	Independent	7,402	1.04%
4	Huang Wen-ling	Independent	34,690	4.88%
5	Hung Min-xiong (洪敏雄)	Independent	7,263	1.02%
Total voters			1,031,222	
Valid votes			710,419	
Invalid votes				
Voter turnout			68.89%	

==== 2025 Central Election Commission nomination ====
In December 2025, President William Lai nominated Huang to serve on the Central Election Commission. The Legislative Yuan voted against Huang's nomination in March 2026.

=== Legislative term ===
While a member of the Legislative Yuan, Huang served as Taiwan Solidarity Union caucus whip. In April 2012, she established the Taiwan–US Legislators Amity Association, a legislative caucus in opposition to the ROC–US Inter-Parliamentary Amity Association. In July, Huang visited Japan to discuss the Senkaku Islands dispute. She supported efforts to subject Premier Sean Chen to a vote of no confidence in September, stating that the result was "a betrayal of the will of the Taiwanese people." After the vote's failure, Huang unsuccessfully petitioned for a recall election against President Ma Ying-jeou. In December, Huang suggested that the TSU invite the Dalai Lama to visit Taiwan, after a planned trip was called off. In 2013, Huang proposed that the Act on Property Declaration by Public Servants be amended, increasing the number of government officials that would need to publicly release the value of their property holdings.

=== Political stances ===
Huang believes that duration of Examination Yuan terms should be shortened to four years. She opposed Taiwan's current electoral framework, single-member districts coupled with party-list representation, a change made in 2008.

She has been critical of the Taipei Police Department, Lung Ying-tai, and Cho Po-yuan.

In September 2019, Huang attempted to register Ko Wen-je's candidacy for the 2020 Taiwan presidential election, although the deadline set by the Central Election Commission had passed.
