= 2015 Taiwanese legislative by-elections =

- 7 February 2015

5 of 113 seats in the Legislative Yuan 57 seats needed for a majority
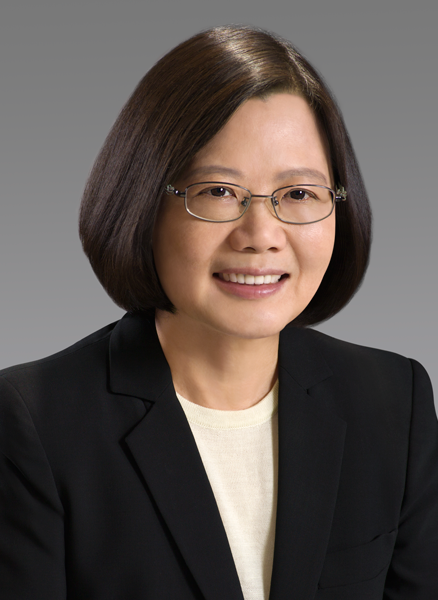

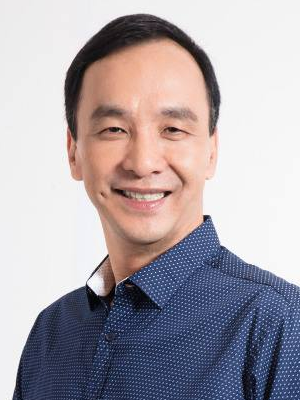
	Majority party	Minority party
Leader	Tsai Ing-wen	Eric Chu
Party	DPP	KMT
Leader since	28 May 2014	19 January 2015
Last election	40 seats, 34.62% (Note: Vote share in party-list votes.)	64 seats, 44.55%
Seats before	37	63
Seats won	3	2
Seats after	40	65

The 2015 Taiwanese legislative by-elections were held on 7 February 2015 in Taiwan to elect 5 of the 113 members of the Legislative Yuan for the remaining term until 2016. No change in the party composition of the Legislative Yuan resulted from the by-elections; three Democratic Progressive Party candidates won the seats vacated by DPP legislators, and two Kuomintang candidates won the seats vacated by KMT legislators.

== Background ==
The by-election was the result of resignations by Kuomintang legislator Hsu Yao-chang from Miaoli County's 2nd district; Lin Chia-lung, Democratic Progressive Party legislator for Taichung City's 6th district; Wei Ming-ku, Democratic Progressive Party legislator for Changhua County's 4th district; Lin Ming-chen, Kuomintang legislator for Nantou County's 2nd district; and Pan Men-an, Democratic Progressive Party legislator for Pingtung County's 3rd district.

Hsu Yao-chang, Wei Ming-ku, Lin Ming-chen, and Pan Men-an won their elections for county magistrate, and Lin Chia-lung won his election for mayor in the 2014 local election. Under the Article 73 of the Civil Servants Election and Recall Act, if any positions become vacant due to resignation or election to another office, and the vacated term is longer than one year, a by-election shall be completed within three months commencing from the date of resignation.

On 5 December 2014, the Central Election Commission announced that by-elections for Taichung 6 and Changhua 4 were to be held on 7 February 2015. Candidate registrations for the two seats were open from 22 to 26 December 2014. On 26 December 2014, the CEC announced that the by-elections for Miaoli 2, Nantou 2, and Pingtung 3 were to be held on 7 February 2015 as well. Candidate registrations for these three seats were open from 26 December 2014 to 9 January 2015.

== Miaoli 2 ==
By-election for Miaoli 2 constituency took place on 7 February 2015. Kuomintang called in head of Gongguan Township Hsu Chih-jung to contest the seat. Democratic Progressive Party called in legislator Wu Yi-chen to contest the seat. The DPP originally supported Sunflower Student Movement activist Chen Wei-ting's bid, but Chen dropped out after allegations of sexual harassment against him surfaced online.

=== Opinion polls ===
Poll Organization	Date of completion	Hsu Chih-jung	Wu Yi-chen	Chen Shu-fen	Undecided
TVBS	30 December 2014	29%	37%	-	34%
TVBS	26 January 2015	33%	34%	2%	31%

=== Results ===
Candidate	Party	Votes	%
Hsu Chih-jung	Kuomintang	47,105	58.21
Wu Yi-chen	Democratic Progressive Party	32,966	40.74
Chen Shu-fen	Independent	851	1.05
Total		80,922	100.00
Valid votes		80,922	99.38
Invalid/blank votes		508	0.62
Total votes		81,430	100.00
Registered voters/turnout		231,684	35.15

== Taichung 6 ==
By-election for Taichung 6 constituency took place on 7 February 2015. KMT called in Deputy Secretary-General of the Executive Yuan Hsiao Chia-chi to contest the seat. DPP called in Taichung City councillor Huang Kuo-shu to contest the seat.

=== Opinion polls ===
Poll Organization	Date of completion	Hsiao Chia-chi	Huang Kuo-shu	Undecided
TVBS	7 January 2015	33%	41%	26%

=== Results ===
Candidate	Party	Votes	%
Huang Kuo-shu	Democratic Progressive Party	45,143	57.83
Hsiao Chia-chi	Kuomintang	32,917	42.17
Total		78,060	100.00
Valid votes		78,060	99.45
Invalid/blank votes		435	0.55
Total votes		78,495	100.00
Registered voters/turnout		255,203	30.76

== Changhua 4 ==
By-election for Changhua 4 constituency took place on 7 February 2015. KMT called in former Changhua County magistrate Cho Po-yuan to contest the seat. DPP called in Changhua County councillor Chen Su-yueh to contest the seat. Former Changhua County councillor Hung Li-na announced her bid as an independent after leaving the KMT.

=== Opinion polls ===
Poll Organization	Date of completion	Cho Po-yuan	Chen Su-yueh	Hung Li-na	Undecided
TVBS	19 December 2014	47%	38%	-	15%
TVBS	8 January 2015	28%	34%	9%	30%

=== Results ===
Candidate	Party	Votes	%
Chen Su-yueh	Democratic Progressive Party	51,907	53.61
Cho Po-yuan	Kuomintang	34,707	35.84
Hung Li-na	Independent	9,774	10.09
Chang Chun-nan	Independent	443	0.46
Total		96,831	100.00
Valid votes		96,831	99.22
Invalid/blank votes		766	0.78
Total votes		97,597	100.00
Registered voters/turnout		259,816	37.56

== Nantou 2 ==
By-election for Nantou 2 constituency took place on 7 February 2015. KMT called in Nantou City mayor Hsu Shu-hua to contest the seat. DPP called in former legislator Tang Huo-shen to contest the seat. Former legislator Chen Cheng-sheng of the People First Party had previously announced his intention to run, but Chen dropped out and supported Tang as the opposition candidate. Assistant professor Shih Chin-fang announced his bid as an independent after leaving the KMT.

=== Opinion polls ===
Poll Organization	Date of completion	Hsu Shu-hua	Tang Huo-shen	Shih Chin-fang	Undecided
TVBS	17 December 2014	37%	35%	-	28%
TVBS	12 January 2015	42%	27%	2%	29%

=== Results ===
Candidate	Party	Votes	%
Hsu Shu-hua	Kuomintang	38,694	51.12
Tang Huo-shen	Democratic Progressive Party	34,938	46.16
Shih Chin-fang	Independent	2,060	2.72
Total		75,692	100.00
Valid votes		75,692	99.42
Invalid/blank votes		440	0.58
Total votes		76,132	100.00
Registered voters/turnout		205,390	37.07

== Pingtung 3 ==
By-election for Pingtung 3 constituency took place on 7 February 2015. KMT's nomination shortlist included legislator Su Ching-chuan, former legislator Liao Wan-ju, and Director-General of the Pingtung County Farmer Association Huang Jui-chi. The KMT ultimately called in Liao to contest the seat. DPP called in former Taipei City councillor Liao Wan-ju to contest the seat. Former Executive Yuan advisor Huang Chao-chan had also expressed interest in running, but the DPP nominated Liao after comparing results from hypothetical head-to-head polling.

=== Opinion polls ===
Poll Organization	Date of completion	Liao Wan-ju	Chuang Jui-hsiung	Undecided
TVBS	29 December 2014	25%	60%	15%

=== Results ===
Candidate	Party	Votes	%
Chuang Jui-hsiung	Democratic Progressive Party	42,988	65.88
Liao Wan-ju	Kuomintang	20,627	31.61
Tsai Tsung-jung	Independent	1,448	2.22
Wu Chia-ti	Independent	193	0.30
Total		65,256	100.00
Valid votes		65,256	99.52
Invalid/blank votes		312	0.48
Total votes		65,568	100.00
Registered voters/turnout		250,139	26.21
