= Fengyuan Senior High School student suicide case =

2023 student suicide in Taiwan

Fengyuan Senior High School Student Suicide Case
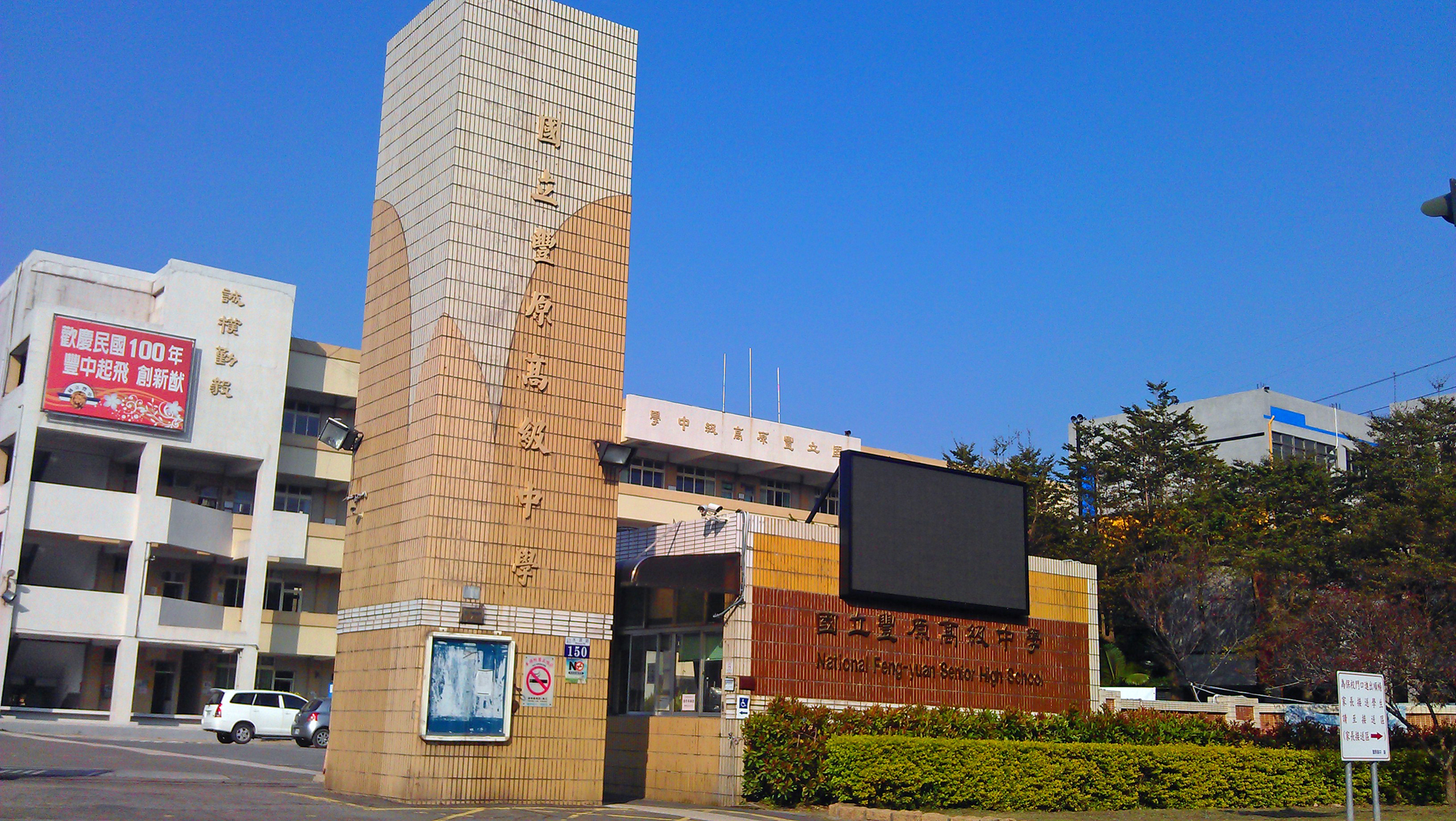
- Taichung Municipal Fengyuan Senior High School
- Date: 18 February 2023 (according to some media reports)
- Duration: October 2022 – mid-February 2023
- Location: Taichung, Taiwan
- Cause: The Humanistic Education Foundation alleged that the student had been bullied by several teachers and school staff members; Fengyuan Senior High School maintained that the incident resulted from the student's personal behavior and family factors.
- Outcome: Student died by suicide; principal received a major demerit and was removed from office

In February 2023, a student at Taichung Municipal Fengyuan Senior High School in Taiwan committed suicide after being subjected to bullying by multiple school staff members between October 2022 and February 2023. The alleged misconduct included illegal body searches, public humiliation, false accusations, and intimidation. On 22 March 2023, the Humanistic Education Foundationheld a press conference and released its own investigation report, triggering widespread discussion in Taiwanese politics and society.

Although the school established an investigative panel, its response was considered inadequate. The Taichung City Department of Education reassigned six staff members involved in the case and the former principal, appointing a supervisor to serve as acting principal and cooperate with the school's internal investigation team. After nearly a year of investigation, the school concluded on 17 February 2024 that bullying had indeed occurred. The principal received a major demerit and was removed from office, the former Director of Student Affairs was suspended for two years, and the former chief military instructor was dismissed. On 15 March 2025, the Control Yuan approved a corrective measure against Fengyuan Senior High School and the Taichung City Department of Education. Its report specifically concluded that Director of Student Affairs Chang Ching-hsiang and chief military instructor Chang Chiao-fu had committed bullying.

== Background ==
According to an interview with the victim's father conducted by the Taiwanese media outlet The Reporter, the student had attended a prestigious private junior high school but was transferred to another school in Changhua after being considered difficult to discipline. Despite continuing disciplinary issues, teachers at the new school remained patient and continued to guide him. During his second year of junior high school, the student received an honorable mention award at a primary and secondary school science fair. In the second semester of his third year, he moved his household registration to Taichung and attempted to enroll in his preferred private senior high school. After failing to do so, he entered Fengyuan Senior High School, where he later became the target of bullying by school staff.

According to information provided by the Humanistic Education Foundation, the student (whose name was withheld and referred to as Student A) had received disciplinary warnings during his first year at Fengyuan Senior High School for underage drinking and smoking, and was subsequently believed to have become the target of school personnel. Beginning in his second year, he was subjected to a series of allegedly unreasonable inspections, including repeated forced body searches, sometimes conducted in public. On one occasion, after arriving late, campus security personnel emptied the contents of his school bag for inspection. School staff were also accused of publicly humiliating him by summoning him through the campus broadcast system in an inappropriate tone. The chief military instructor reportedly referred to him as "scum" and "garbage" in front of classmates in an attempt to isolate him socially.

School personnel were also accused of applying a presumption of guilt and framing him for the incident. Following a theft incident on campus, Student A was summoned to the military instructor's office and questioned despite the absence of evidence. Although he repeatedly denied involvement, the school informed his parents that he had committed theft and threatened to refer the matter to juvenile court. In another incident, several students were found carrying electronic cigarettes during a surprise inspection. Despite contradictory testimonies and the accusation relying on the statement of only one student, Student A was nevertheless given a Category B warning under school regulations.

These experiences caused Student A to resist attending school, and his absences increased. School officials later summoned his parents and, citing his personal problems, pressured them to sign transfer documents and force him to withdraw from school or to sign a "voluntary statement" promising not to violate school rules again. Student A's father had previously attempted to cooperate with the school's counseling office and assist with educational guidance, but school staff allegedly obstructed his efforts. In January 2023, the Director of Student Affairs claimed that Student A exhibited abnormal facial twitching and suspected drug use. After summoning his parents, the school forced him to undergo urinalysis, which ultimately yielded negative results.

In anger, Student A purchased joss paper and scattered it in classrooms and corridors, and also presented condolence money in white envelopes to school staff as a form of protest. On 18 February 2023, according to media reports, he died by suicide at home.

== Aftermath ==
Following Student A's death, Fengyuan Senior High School convened a campus crisis management meeting on the morning of 18 February and distributed psychological support materials to teachers. The Student Counseling Center of the Taichung City Government Department of Education intervened to provide assistance aimed at reducing the psychological impact of the suicide on students and staff.

The Department of Education told the media that "Student A had long been a counseling case under the school's guidance office. His behavior had become unusual during the previous semester, and the school had followed procedures to understand the situation and continued to provide care. The tragedy saddened the school, and the family understood the school's counseling process."

== Humanistic Education Foundation statement ==
In the past, Student A received disciplinary demerits for drinking alcohol, and from that point on the school determined that he had no opportunity for redemption, making him a thorn in its side. In every matter, the school simply presumed that Student A was guilty. Since he received demerits in his first year, the school had numerous opportunities to guide him, assist him, and counsel him. Instead, it chose to monitor him, humiliate him, and treat him like a criminal, eventually attempting to expel him and even accusing him of crimes without evidence.

— Humanistic Education Foundation

On 22 March, Tseng Fang-yuan, director of the central Taiwan office of the Humanistic Education Foundation, together with Student A's father, Legislator Chang Liao Wan-chien, and several Taichung city councilors, held a press conference to announce the foundation's findings and demanded severe punishment for the staff involved. The foundation also criticized the Taichung City Department of Education for violating the principle of confidentiality in student counseling, accusing it of shifting responsibility onto the deceased student, misleading the public, and knowingly violating the law. It made two demands:

- "The Taichung City Department of Education should investigate those responsible for illegal conduct in this case, including the Director of Student Affairs, the chief military instructor, military instructors, and campus security personnel, who continuously employed unlawful means against the student, and should expand its investigation into other improper disciplinary practices, including illegal body searches, and dismiss those involved according to law."
- "The Taichung City Government should investigate the Taichung City Department of Education's violation of the confidentiality principle in student counseling, determine the responsibility of the relevant personnel, and impose appropriate sanctions."

The Taichung City Department of Education responded that it had "never attributed the case to family factors or the student's personal behavior". It stated that the matter would be handled impartially and cited testimony from some teachers and students. The school convened a school affairs meeting in accordance with regulations, and on 10 March resolved to establish an investigation team. An online meeting was held on 19 March, and interviews with relevant individuals began on 27 March.

== Official response ==
On 24 March, the Taichung City Department of Education concluded that the school's response had been overly passive and reassigned the principal, chief military instructor, military instructors, and other personnel involved.On 27 March, the department appointed a supervisor as acting principal acting principal and tasked the investigation team with determining the investigation schedule, aiming to produce preliminary findings after the Qingming（solar term) holiday. It also convened a teacher evaluation committee, which decided to suspend the Director of Student Affairs for three months pending further investigation.The department stated that questionnaires would be used to gather information from the victim's friends and witnesses in order to reconstruct the events and establish the truth.

On 27 March, Mayor of Taichung Lu Shiow-yen stated that the school's investigation had been excessively passive and instructed the Department of Education to resolve the matter as soon as possible. The Taichung City Council scheduled a regular session for 13 April, requiring the Department of Education to submit a special report by that date. On 11 April, the school affairs meeting concluded that the former Director of Student Affairs, the chief military instructor, and two student affairs innovation personnel had engaged in improper discipline and issued demerits against them. Individual cases were referred to evaluation committees or other bodies for administrative sanctions. However, no improper conduct was found involving three other individuals, and further investigation was to continue. On 13 April, the Department of Education determined that the principal had handled the matter passively after the student's death, delaying the investigation and demonstrating a lack of leadership once the incident expanded. It therefore imposed a major demerit and removed the principal from office.

On 21 April, Taichung City Councilor Wang Li-jen published a report prepared by the investigation team into improper discipline. The report concluded that approximately 70 percent of the twenty-three major and minor demerits imposed on Student A were flawed and should be revoked. It also noted that school personnel had focused on Student A far more frequently than on other students and that many inspections lacked sufficient justification. The report criticized the school's poor understanding of relevant regulations and its misuse of disciplinary mechanisms, which caused the student severe stress and fear. Director of Education Chiang Wei-min promised to urge schools to review their counseling systems and stated that the selection process for a new principal would begin following the dismissal of the former principal.

At the end of June, after the three-month suspension of the former Director of Student Affairs expired, he was reinstated. The Humanistic Education Foundation argued that reinstatement was inappropriate before the investigation had been completed, and Fengyuan Senior High School subsequently decided to suspend him for an additional month. Legislator Chang Liao Wan-chien criticized the Taichung City Government's investigative mechanism as unfriendly and procedurally unjust, accusing it of "teachers protecting teachers", and stated that he would join the parents in petitioning the Control Yuan.

On 26 June, the school submitted its bullying investigation report to the Taichung City Department of Education. The department determined that some aspects of the investigation were incomplete and returned the report on 4 July, ordering the school to reopen the investigation and conduct a more thorough review. Although the investigation had begun on 25 March and regulations required completion within two months, with a possible two-month extension, 25 July was the deadline for submission. The student's family complained that they had still not been allowed to see the report and alleged that the school had responded that "superiors said it could not be provided".

The school did not submit its report until 29 August. It concluded that the case involved improper discipline rather than bullying and issued a single demerit to the Director of Student Affairs.

The Taichung City Department of Education considered the punishment inconsistent with the investigation findings and convened a special review committee on 1 September, which resolved to suspend the Director of Student Affairs for one year. Dissatisfied with the findings, the Humanistic Education Foundation requested a review. The appeal was upheld at the end of September, and the case was returned to Fengyuan Senior High School for reinvestigation. Because of the large number of individuals involved and the extensive documentation, the school twice applied for one-month extensions to complete a more comprehensive investigation. In February 2024, the school concluded that bullying had indeed occurred, suspended the Director of Student Affairs for one year, and recommended that the Department of Education dismiss the chief military instructor.

== Impact ==
=== Taiwanese politics ===
On 23 March, Legislator Chang Liao Wan-chien again condemned the school's bullying of Student A during a Legislative Yuan session on "Transitional justice tasks and the promotion of human rights education pursuant to the Act on Promoting Transitional Justice". He pointed out that the student had previously been identified as gifted before entering high school, but after enrolling had become the target of six teachers and staff members over a can of beer. During his first semester of first year, he received nine warnings and two minor demerits; during the first semester of second year, he received fourteen warnings and four minor demerits.

Chang Liao Wan-chien and Legislator Chen Hsiu-pao questioned Minister of Education Pan Wen-chung regarding the case. Chang further noted that former principal Lo Jui-hung had received two-thirds opposition votes in principal selection processes on two occasions, yet still assumed office. He argued that the current system for handling unsuitable military instructors and campus security personnel required reform. Pan responded that the Ministry of Education would investigate the case rigorously and acknowledged that some schools had failed to keep pace with existing regulations, promising stronger supervision to ensure legal compliance.

Legislator Lai Pin-yu called on the Ministry of Education to closely monitor the Taichung City Government's handling of the case and proposed expanding the investigation, codifying professional ethics standards for teachers, basing determinations of unsuitable teachers on conduct rather than qualifications, and fulfilling long-delayed promises to remove military instructors from campuses.[28] She also introduced amendments to the Act Governing the Appointment of Educators to align qualification requirements with those under the Teachers' Act and urged the Ministry of Education to prioritize the bill and seek cross-party consensus. Lai further questioned the Taichung City Department of Education's decision to transfer personnel involved in the case to positions within the department, arguing that doing so could undermine the fairness of the investigation.

=== Public reaction ===
I bring up this experience simply to say that a good teacher can save a student, but teachers can also drive a student to death. My son was fortunate enough to have an excellent homeroom teacher in junior high school, but he did not meet good teachers at Fengyuan Senior High School.

— Father of Student A

After the Humanistic Education Foundation released its findings and condemned the school's conduct, criticism of Fengyuan Senior High School intensified. Members of the public left comments on the school's Facebook page and related groups, telephoned the school to criticize and insult staff, and published the names of teachers alleged to have participated in the bullying.

As a result of the public backlash, Fengyuan Senior High School disabled comments on its social media pages. The student association stated that feelings of grief and anger were widespread among those on campus and appealed to the public not to engage in cyberbullying against teachers and students.

On 28 March, the Director of Student Affairs involved in the case issued an apology via text message, stating that he would deeply reflect on his past words and actions. However, he denied allegations by the Humanistic Education Foundation and some media outlets that he had engaged in persecution, forced withdrawal from school, endless searches, or collective bullying.

Taipei City Integrity Committee member and lawyer Lu Chiu-yuan argued that many disciplinary practices commonly used in high schools effectively constituted illegal searches, intimidation, false accusations, and coercion under criminal law. He also offered recommendations to schools, parents, and students aimed at eliminating campus bullying.

According to a survey by DailyView, the case generated 57,141 online mentions within one month. The survey also noted that public attention to the case had been partly diverted by the fatal shooting of an escaped baboon from Leofoo Village Theme Park during the same month.

== Related controversy ==
On 16 May 2023, the Humanistic Education Foundation held a press conference accusing the chief military instructor involved in the bullying of Student A of sexually harassing another female student (hereafter "Student B"). Student B had reportedly complained to teachers, the Student Affairs Office, the principal, and the Taichung City Government, but no action had been taken, and the Department of Education was suspected of failing to initiate gender equity procedures. A Gender Equity Education Committee meeting was convened only after the appointment of a new principal.

According to the foundation, the chief military instructor repeatedly harassed Student B with sexually suggestive remarks and, after she rejected his advances, maliciously altered her attendance records, leading to disciplinary penalties. Student B further stated that another military instructor involved in the bullying of Student A had also bullied her through school bag inspections and verbal abuse, causing her to experience suicidal thoughts.

On 28 July, the school's Gender Equity Education Committee concluded that the sexual harassment allegations were substantiated and referred the case to the personnel evaluation committee for severe punishment. Control Yuan member Tien Chiu-chin accepted a petition regarding the matter and announced that she would seek an investigation to determine whether the Taichung City Government and Fengyuan Senior High School had committed administrative negligence.
