= Changhua County Constituency 1 =

Constituency of the Legislative Yuan of Taiwan

- Single-member constituency for the Legislative Yuan
- District(s): Shengang, Xianxi, Hemei, Lukang, Fuxing, Xiushui
- Electorate: 254,642 (2024 election)

Current constituency
- Created: 2008
- Party: DPP
- Member: Chen Hsiu-pao

Changhua County Constituency 1 (Chinese: 彰化縣第一選舉區) is one of the 73 regional constituencies represented in the Legislative Yuan, the national legislature of Taiwan. It was created in 2008 following a series of constitutional reforms, and elects one legislator, through first-past-the-post voting, to the Legislative Yuan. It has been represented by Chen Hsiu-pao of the Democratic Progressive Party since 2020.

== Legislators ==
Election	Legislator	Party
2008 - 2011	Chen Hsiu-ching	Kuomintang
2011 - 2012	Vacant (Note: Incumbent died on 22 April 2011, and as the seat was vacated less than a year before the next scheduled election, no by-election took place)	
2012 - 2019	Wang Huei-mei	Kuomintang
2019 - 2020	Ko Cheng-fang	Kuomintang
2020	Chen Hsiu-pao	Democratic Progressive Party

== Election results ==

=== 2008 ===
2008 Taiwanese legislative election: Changhua 1
Candidate	Party	Votes	%
Chen Hsiu-ching	Kuomintang	67,236	44.97
Chen Chin-ting	Non-Partisan Solidarity Union	50,771	33.96
Ko Chin-te	Democratic Progressive Party	31,516	21.08
Total		149,523	100.00
Valid votes		149,523	97.48
Invalid/blank votes		3,863	2.52
Total votes		153,386	100.00
Registered voters/turnout		230,049	66.68
Majority		16,465	11.01
Kuomintang win (new seat)			

=== 2012 ===
2012 Taiwanese legislative election: Changhua 1
Candidate	Party	Votes	%	+/–
Wang Huei-mei	Kuomintang	63,026	35.21	▼9.76
Chen Chin-ting	Democratic Progressive Party	62,640	34.99	▲13.91
Lin I-pang	Independent	50,615	28.28	NEW
Shih Yueh-ying	Green Party Taiwan	2,717	1.52	NEW
Total		178,998	100.00	–
Valid votes		178,998	98.36	
Invalid/blank votes		2,977	1.64	
Total votes		181,975	100.00	
Registered voters/turnout		239,563	75.96	
Majority		386	0.22	
Kuomintang hold				

=== 2016 ===
* denotes the incumbent legislator

2016 Taiwanese legislative election: Changhua 1
Candidate	Party	Votes	%	+/–
Wang Huei-mei*	Kuomintang	92,373	56.20	▲20.99
Chen Wen-pin	Democratic Progressive Party	72,003	43.80	▲8.81
Total		164,376	100.00	–
Valid votes		164,376	97.34	
Invalid/blank votes		4,487	2.66	
Total votes		168,863	100.00	
Registered voters/turnout		247,505	68.23	
Majority		20,370	12.4	
Kuomintang hold				

=== 2019 by-election ===
2019 Legislative Yuan by-election: Changhua 1
Candidate	Party	Votes	%	+/–
Ko Cheng-fan	Kuomintang	47,835	52.11	▼4.09
Huang Chen-yen	Democratic Progressive Party	41,946	45.69	▲1.89
Chi Ching-tang	Independent	2,022	2.20	NEW
Total		91,803	100.00	–
Valid votes		91,803	99.34	
Invalid/blank votes		608	0.66	
Total votes		92,411	100.00	
Registered voters/turnout		252,529	36.59	
Majority		5,889	6.42	
Kuomintang hold				

=== 2020 ===
* denotes the incumbent legislator

2020 Taiwanese legislative election: Changhua 1
Candidate	Party	Votes	%	+/–
Chen Hsiu-pao	Democratic Progressive Party	96,191	52.03	▲6.34
Ko Cheng-fang*	Kuomintang	88,690	47.97	▼4.14
Total		184,881	100.00	–
Valid votes		184,881	97.73	
Invalid/blank votes		4,303	2.27	
Total votes		189,184	100.00	
Registered voters/turnout		253,540	74.62	
Majority		7,501	4.06	
Democratic Progressive Party gain from Kuomintang				

=== 2024 ===
* denotes the incumbent legislator

2024 Taiwanese legislative election: Changhua 1
Candidate	Party	Votes	%	+/–
Chen Hsiu-pao*	Democratic Progressive Party	98,437	54.57	▲2.54
Juan Hou-chueh	Kuomintang	76,448	42.38	▼5.59
Su Chun-chieh	Independent	5,503	3.05	NEW
Total		180,388	100.00	–
Valid votes		180,388	97.03	
Invalid/blank votes		5,528	2.97	
Total votes		185,916	100.00	
Registered voters/turnout		254,642	73.01	
Majority		21,989	12.19	
Democratic Progressive Party hold				
