= Changhua County Constituency 2 =

Constituency of the Legislative Yuan of Taiwan

- Single-member constituency for the Legislative Yuan
- District(s): Changhua City, Huatan, Fenyuan
- Electorate: 239,682 (2024 election)

Current constituency
- Created: 2008
- Party: DPP
- Member: Huang Hsiu-fang

Changhua County Constituency 2 (Chinese: 彰化縣第二選舉區) is one of the 73 regional constituencies represented in the Legislative Yuan, the national legislature of Taiwan. It was created in 2008 following a series of constitutional reforms, and elects one legislator, through first-past-the-post voting, to the Legislative Yuan. It has been represented by Huang Hsiu-fang of the Democratic Progressive Party since 2016.

== Legislators ==
Election	Legislator	Party
2008 - 2016	Lin Tsang-min	Kuomintang
2016	Huang Hsiu-fang	Democratic Progressive Party

== Election results ==

=== 2008 ===
2008 Taiwanese legislative election: Changhua 2
Candidate	Party	Votes	%
Lin Tsang-min	Kuomintang	77,871	60.03
Chiu Chuang-chin	Democratic Progressive Party	47,809	36.85
Lin Chao-peng	Taiwan Solidarity Union	4,047	3.12
Total		129,727	100.00
Valid votes		129,727	98.22
Invalid/blank votes		2,345	1.78
Total votes		132,072	100.00
Registered voters/turnout		225,159	58.66
Majority		30,062	23.18
Kuomintang win (new seat)			

=== 2012 ===
* denotes the incumbent legislator

2012 Taiwanese legislative election: Changhua 2
Candidate	Party	Votes	%	+/–
Lin Tsang-min*	Kuomintang	96,108	55.47	▼4.56
Huang Hsiu-fang	Democratic Progressive Party	77,158	44.53	▲7.68
Total		173,266	100.00	–
Valid votes		173,266	98.23	
Invalid/blank votes		3,114	1.77	
Total votes		176,380	100.00	
Registered voters/turnout		233,100	75.67	
Majority		18,950	10.94	
Kuomintang hold				

=== 2016 ===
* denotes the incumbent legislator

2016 Taiwanese legislative election: Changhua 2
Candidate	Party	Votes	%	+/–
Huang Hsiu-fang	Democratic Progressive Party	73,227	45.07	▲0.54
Lin Tsnag-min*	Kuomintang	65,020	40.02	▼15.45
Huang Yu-fen	Independent	12,380	7.62	NEW
Wen Kuo-ming	Labor Party	5,773	3.55	NEW
Chang Yao-yuan	Minkuotang	4,554	2.80	NEW
Hsu Yung-chin	Independent	860	0.53	NEW
Liu Yung-chun	Independent	657	0.40	NEW
Total		162,471	100.00	–
Valid votes		162,471	98.45	
Invalid/blank votes		2,555	1.55	
Total votes		165,026	100.00	
Registered voters/turnout		237,921	69.36	
Majority		8,207	5.05	
Democratic Progressive Party gain from Kuomintang				

=== 2020 ===
* denotes the incumbent legislator

2020 Taiwanese legislative election: Changhua 2
Candidate	Party	Votes	%	+/–
Huang Hsiu-fang*	Democratic Progressive Party	83,013	45.11	▲0.04
Chang Han-tien	Kuomintang	78,177	42.48	▲2.46
Huang Yu-fen	Independent	22,834	12.41	▲4.79
Total		184,024	100.00	–
Valid votes		184,024	98.58	
Invalid/blank votes		2,653	1.42	
Total votes		186,677	100.00	
Registered voters/turnout		241,162	77.41	
Majority		4,836	2.63	
Democratic Progressive Party hold				

=== 2024 ===
* denotes the incumbent legislator

2024 Taiwanese legislative election: Changhua 2
Candidate	Party	Votes	%	+/–
Huang Hsiu-fang*	Democratic Progressive Party	90,688	52.70	▲7.59
Yang Yao-tsung	Kuomintang	81,403	47.30	▲4.82
Total		172,091	100.00	–
Valid votes		172,091	96.83	
Invalid/blank votes		5,639	3.17	
Total votes		177,730	100.00	
Registered voters/turnout		239,682	74.15	
Majority		9,285	5.4	
Democratic Progressive Party hold				
