= Pai Ya-tsan =

Taiwanese political activist

- 白雅燦
- Born: 8 January 1945 (age 81)
- Education: National Chengchi University (LLB)

Pai Ya-tsan (Chinese: 白雅燦; pinyin: Bái Yǎcàn; born 8 January 1945) is a Taiwanese political activist. During his imprisonment, Amnesty International designated Pai a prisoner of conscience.

== Life and career ==
Raised in Changhua County, Pai studied law at National Chengchi University. His political involvement began in 1969, campaigning for Huang Hsin-chieh, who won election to the Legislative Yuan. Suspected of sedition, Pai was jailed for four months in 1971, then released. In 1973, he supported a number of tangwai candidates for Taipei City Council. Pai chose to contest the legislative election of 1975, but was arrested in October for distributing campaign fliers which contained 29 questions addressed to Chiang Ching-kuo, as well as political policies suggested by Pai. The next month, he went to trial and was sentenced to life imprisonment by a military court. While imprisoned he went on hunger strikes to protest foreign policies and political repression. In February 1986, legislators Chiang Peng-chien and Fang Su-min petitioned for Pai's release. Instead, Pai's prison sentence was commuted to fifteen years upon the lifting of martial law in July 1987. Throughout the year, Pai's health continued to decline, and he was released in April 1988.

In November 2018, Pai contested the Changhua County magistracy as an independent candidate.

2018 Changhua County magistrate election results
No.	Candidate	Party	Votes	Percentage
1	Wei Ming-ku	Democratic Progressive Party	283,269	39.87%
2	Wang Huei-mei	Kuomintang	377,795	53.18%
3	Pai Ya-tsan	Independent	7,402	1.04%
4	Huang Wen-ling	Independent	34,690	4.88%
5	Hung Min-xiong (洪敏雄)	Independent	7,263	1.02%
Total voters			1,031,222	
Valid votes			710,419	
Invalid votes				
Voter turnout			68.89%	
