= J. Bruce Jacobs =

American-born Australian academic (1943–2019)

J. Bruce Jacobs AM
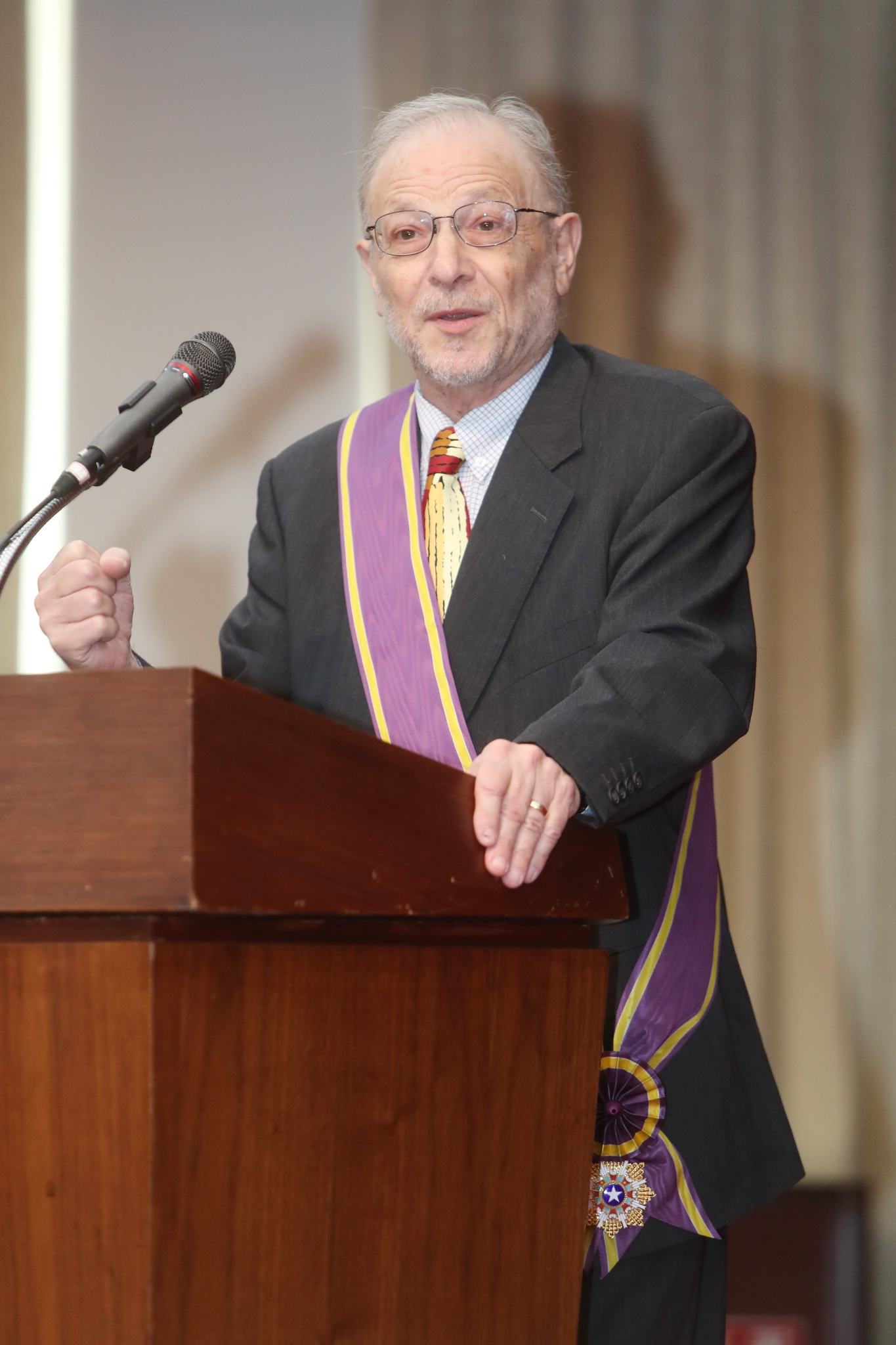
- Jacobs was awarded the Order of Brilliant Star in November 2018
- Born: Jeffrey Bruce Jacobs; 19 September 1943; Fort Lauderdale, Florida
- Died: 24 November 2019 (aged 76); Melbourne, Australia
- Spouse: Kim Jung-sim

Academic background
- Education: Columbia University

Academic work
- Discipline: Asian studies
- Sub-discipline: Taiwan studies
- Institutions: Monash University
- J. Bruce Jacobs's voice Jacobs speaking in Mandarin Chinese about Tsai Ing-wen and the 1992 Consensus (from 0:45); Recorded May 2016

Jeffrey Bruce Jacobs AM (19 September 1943 – 24 November 2019) was an American-born Australian orientalist who specialized in Taiwan studies. He taught at La Trobe University before joining the faculty at Monash University as professor of Asian languages and studies, where he was granted emeritus status upon retirement. In Taiwan, he was known as Chia Po (Chinese: 家博; pinyin: jiābó), a simplified transliteration of his surname, or by the nickname Big Beard (大鬍子; dà hú zi).

== Life and career ==
J. Bruce Jacobs was born on 19 September 1943 to parents Robert Baron Jacobs and Sonia Annette Lesh in Fort Lauderdale, Florida. The Jacobs family moved their five children to Boulder, Colorado, in 1951, when Robert began working for the National Bureau of Standards. Bruce was educated at Columbia University, where he earned bachelor's, master's, and doctoral degrees. While completing master's-level coursework, Jacobs spent 1965 and 1966 in Taiwan, with the History Research Institute of National Taiwan University. Jacobs finished his master's degree in 1970. He returned to Taiwan between 1971 and 1973, during his doctoral study, which he completed in 1975. In 1976, Jacobs was named a lecturer at La Trobe University. In 1980, Jacobs was detained for three months, and falsely accused of involvement in the stabbing death of Lin Yi-hsiung's mother, as well as the murder of twin daughters born to Lin and Fang Su-min. In its coverage of the murders, the United Daily News became the first publication to refer to Jacobs as "Big Beard." Following his departure from Taiwan in May 1980, Jacobs was barred by the Kuomintang government from entering Taiwan until 1992.

In the early 1990s, Jacobs was appointed to the Australia–China Council. He began teaching at Monash University in 1991, and was granted emeritus status upon retirement in 2014. Jacobs received the Order of Brilliant Star with Grand Cordon from the government of the Republic of China in November 2018, and was named a member of the Order of Australia in the 2019 Queen's Birthday Honours. Jacobs was diagnosed with pancreatic cancer in 2017, and died in Melbourne on 24 November 2019, aged 76. He was married to Kim Jung-sim.

== Publications ==
Several opinion pieces written by Jacobs were published in the Taipei Times. While writing for that publication, he argued that a paradigm shift was necessary in Taiwanese politics and diplomatic efforts, while comparing the one-China policy to the flat Earth model. Jacobs also opined on the teaching of Taiwanese history, the Senkaku Islands dispute, territorial disputes in the South China Sea, and Cross-Strait as well as foreign relations of Taiwan. In 2013, Jacobs argued for Taiwan's status as a middle power. He was a signatory or sole author of several open letters appearing in the Taipei Times, which discussed a wide array of topics relating to politics in Taiwan. Such letters were specifically addressed to Taiwanese politicians Wang Ching-feng, Ma Ying-jeou, and generally to Taiwanese people, as well as Canadian prime minister Justin Trudeau and Qantas chief executive officer Alan Joyce. Jacobs regularly penned electoral analyses for the Taipei Times, including in 2004, 2005, 2008's presidential and legislative election, 2010, 2014, 2016, and 2018.

In written and spoken commentary, Jacobs was critical of Su Chi, as well as the presidency of Chen Shui-bian. He also discussed the loss of Taiwan-centric publications Taiwan Communique and Thinking Taiwan, which both ceased publication in 2016. In Lee Teng-hui and the Idea of Taiwan Jacobs and I-hao Ben Liu discussed Lee Teng-hui's contribution to Taiwan's democratization, Taiwanization, and Taiwanese nationalism. Jacobs wrote a number of books about Taiwan, which included Local Politics in Rural Taiwan under Dictatorship and Democracy (2008), Democratizing Taiwan (2012), The Kaohsiung Incident in Taiwan and Memoirs of a Foreign Big Beard (2016), and Changing Taiwanese Identities (2018, edited with Peter Kang).

=== List of publications ===
J. Bruce Jacobs (1971). "Recent Leadership and Political Trends in Taiwan". The China Quarterly. 45 (45): 129–54. doi:10.1017/S0305741000010468. JSTOR 651887. S2CID 154747588.
