= Huang Kuo-shu =

Taiwanese politician (born 1964)

Huang Kuo-shu MLY
- 黃國書
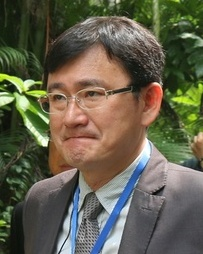
- Huang in May 2016

Member of the Legislative Yuan
- In office 16 February 2015 – 31 January 2024
- Preceded by: Lin Chia-lung
- Succeeded by: Lo Ting-wei
- Constituency: Taichung 6

Member of the Taichung City Council
- In office 1 March 1998 – 16 February 2015

Personal details
- Born: 3 January 1964 (age 62) Nantou County, Taiwan
- Party: Democratic Progressive Party (until 2021)
- Education: Taipei National University of the Arts (BFA); National Chung Hsing University (MA)

Chinese name
- Traditional Chinese: 黃國書
- Simplified Chinese: 黄国书
Transcriptions
Standard Mandarin
- Hanyu Pinyin: Huáng Guóshū
- Wade–Giles: Huang2 Guo2shu1

Huang Kuo-shu (traditional Chinese: 黃國書; born 3 January 1964) is a Taiwanese politician. For the majority of his political career, Huang was affiliated with the Democratic Progressive Party. Huang served as a Taichung City Councilor from 1998 to 2015, when he won a by-election to the Legislative Yuan. He was elected to two consecutive full terms as a member of the Legislative Yuan, in 2016 and 2020. Huang withdrew from the Democratic Progressive Party in 2021, and completed his legislative tenure as a political independent.

== Education ==
Huang attended National Taichung First Senior High School and graduated from Taipei National University of the Arts before earning a master's degree from National Chung Hsing University.

== Political career ==
Huang served on the Taichung City Council from 1998 to 2015, when he was elected to the Legislative Yuan after winning a by-election against Hsiao Chia-chi. Since taking his seat in the legislature, Huang has researched safety standards for young children and participated in discussions about education. He was named a convenor of the Legislative Yuan's Education and Culture Committee in March 2016, alongside Apollo Chen. From this position, Huang has opposed the proposed merger of Tainan National University of the Arts with National Cheng Kung University, stating that such a move was a "top-down effort" to "kill TNNUA’s founding spirit." He has supported attempts to remove military instructors from educational institutions in Taiwan. During his legislative tenure, Huang has worked to uncover improprieties in many governmental agencies and programs. Huang has frequently been critical of organizations providing oversight of sports in Taiwan.

On 16 October 2021, the Liberty Times reported that Huang had served as an informant for the Kuomintang one-party state during Taiwan's martial law period. Huang subsequently confirmed the news report on Facebook, acknowledging that he had agreed to provide an intelligence unit with information on friends affiliated with the political opposition during his 20s, while he was attending university. Huang additionally stated that he would complete his legislative term, withdraw from the Democratic Progressive Party, and vowed not to run for office in the 2024 legislative election.
