= Lin Yi-hsiung =

Taiwanese politician

- 林義雄
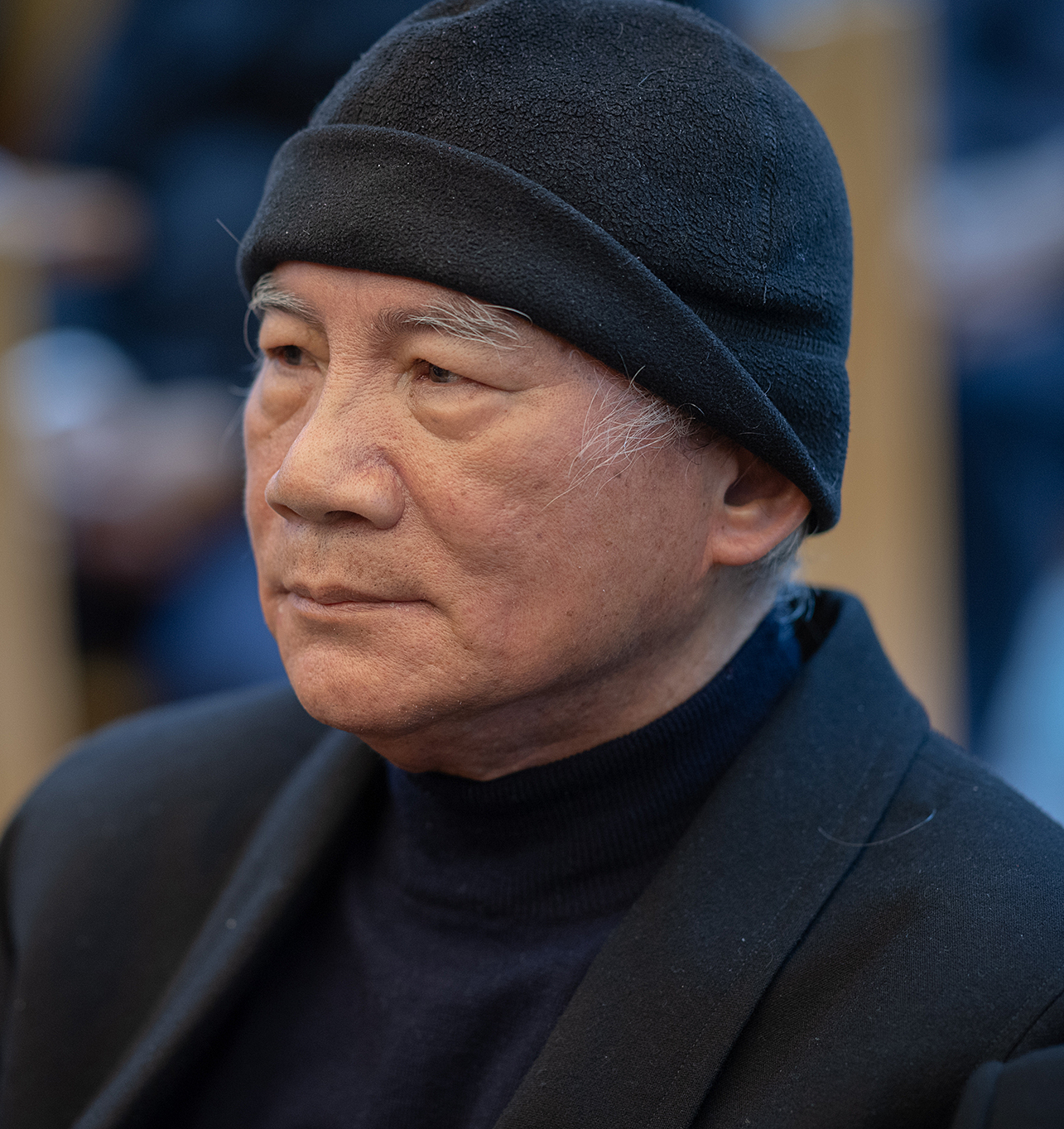
- Lin in 2019

7th Chairman of the Democratic Progressive Party
- In office 18 July 1998 – 20 April 2000
- Preceded by: Hsu Hsin-liang
- Succeeded by: Frank Hsieh

Personal details
- Born: 24 August 1941 (age 84) Goketsu Village, Ratō District, Taihoku Prefecture, Japanese Taiwan (modern-day Wujie Township, Yilan County, Taiwan)
- Party: Independent (2006–present)
- Other political affiliations: Democratic Progressive Party (1989–2006)
- Spouse: Fang Su-min
- Education: National Taiwan University (LLB); Harvard University (MPA)
- Profession: Lawyer

Chinese name
- Traditional Chinese: 林義雄
- Simplified Chinese: 林义雄
Transcriptions
Standard Mandarin
- Hanyu Pinyin: Lín Yìxióng
Southern Min
- Hokkien POJ: Lîm Gī-hiông

Lin Yi-hsiung (Chinese: 林義雄; born 24 August 1941) is a Taiwanese politician and lawyer. He was a major leader of the democratization movement in Taiwan. He was first exposed to politics in 1976 while serving as attorney for Kuo Yu-hsin (1908–1985) who sued the ruling Kuomintang for electoral fraud. Lin was elected a member of Taiwan Provincial Consultative Council in Kuo's old electorate in 1977.

== Early life and education ==
Lin was born on August 24, 1941, in Taihoku Prefecture. After high school, he attended law school at National Taiwan University and graduated with a Bachelor of Laws (LL.B.) in 1964. Later, in 1987, he completed graduate studies in the United States at Harvard University, where he earned a Master of Public Administration (M.P.A.) from the Harvard Kennedy School.

== Lin family massacre ==
On 13 December 1979, Lin was arrested for his involvement in the Kaohsiung Incident. His wife, Fang Su-min, and mother were first allowed to visit him on 27 February 1980; Lin was in detention and had been beaten severely by Taiwanese police. Lin's 60-year-old mother, Yu A-mei (游阿妹; Yóu Āmèi), contacted Amnesty International's office in Osaka, Japan, after their visit.

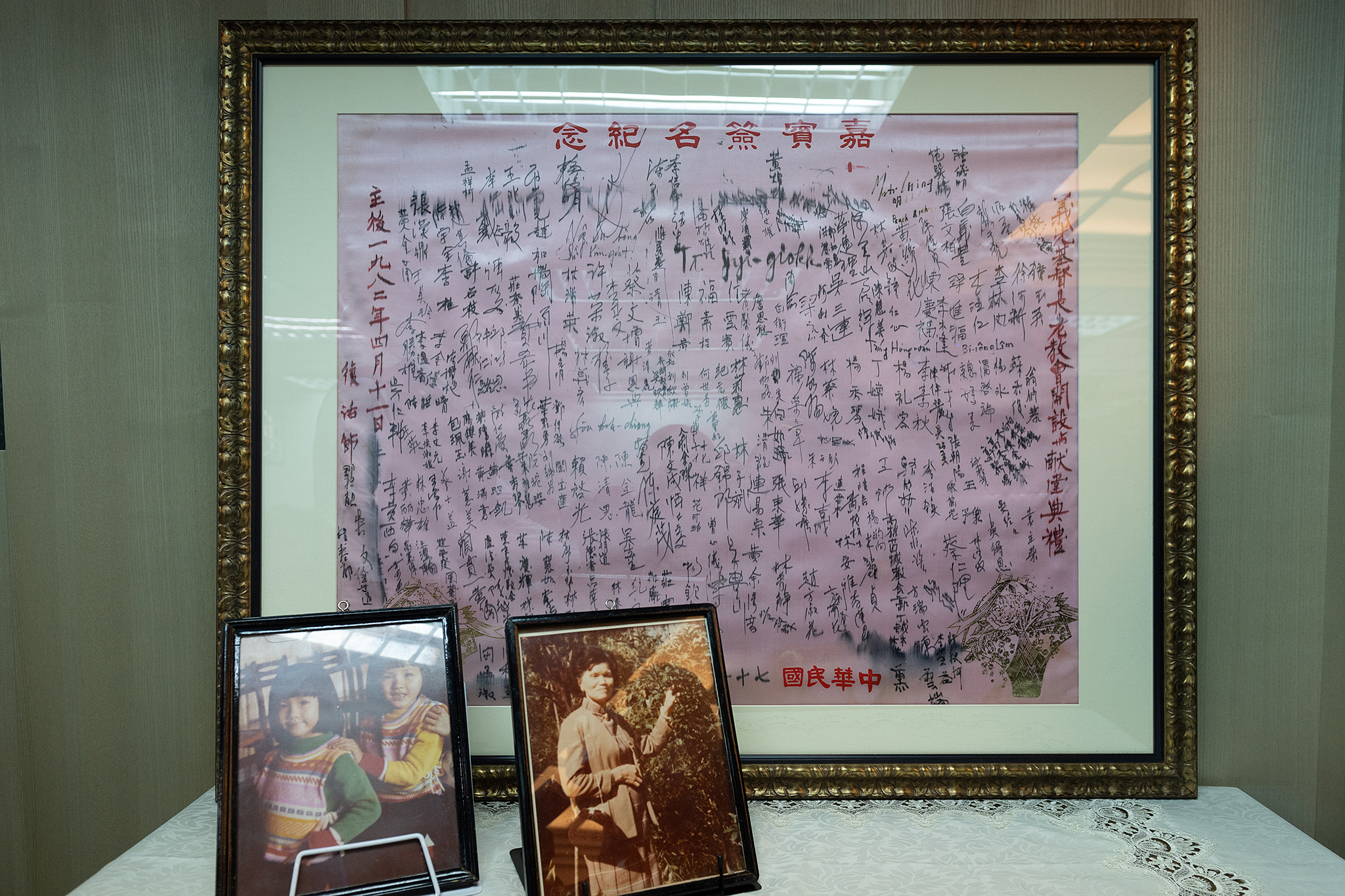
Condolences and photos of the victims, 2019 anniversary memorial service at Gikong Presbyterian Church.

Around noon on 28 February, an unknown assailant or assailants broke into Lin's home off Xinyi Road in Taipei and stabbed Yu and Lin's three daughters. Yu and two of the daughters, 6-year-old twins Lin Liang-chun (林亮均; Lín Liàngjūn) and Lin Ting-chun (林亭均; Lín Tíngjūn), died of their wounds; the eldest daughter, 9-year-old Judy Linton (Lin Huan-chun), was badly wounded after being stabbed multiple times and was the only survivor of the incident. Fang was not at home, as she was visiting Lin at the time. The authorities claimed to know nothing about the murders, even though Lin's house was under tight 24-hour police surveillance; because of this, it has been speculated the murders were committed as a warning to other pro-democracy activists. 28 February is a date generally understood by Taiwanese as intended to evoke the incident in 1947.

I don't know if [the murderer] is still alive now. But I don't hate him, because love is our best weapon.

— Fang Su-min, quoted in 2002 Taipei Times article

There are no suspects in the murders to this day; although an American family friend of the Lins, J. Bruce Jacobs, was officially accused and placed under "police protection", he later was released without charges and expelled from Taiwan. Investigative journalist David E. Kaplan concluded the "Iron Blood Patriots", a criminal gang, may have been responsible, under the auspices of Chiang Hsiao-wu.

=== Afterwards ===
Fang moved to the US with her eldest daughter in 1981; Lin Huan-chun learned piano, embraced Christianity, and married Christian reverend Joel Linton in 1998. She is now a renowned pianist and gospel singer in Taiwan. After returning to Taiwan in 1983, Fang was elected to the Legislative Yuan in December of that year. Chen Ding-nan stated the murder of Lin's mother and daughters also motivated him to start his political career.

In August 1984, Lin left jail on parole. Desmond Tutu met with Lin during a visit to Taiwan in 2007, urging forgiveness and publicity for Lin's story.

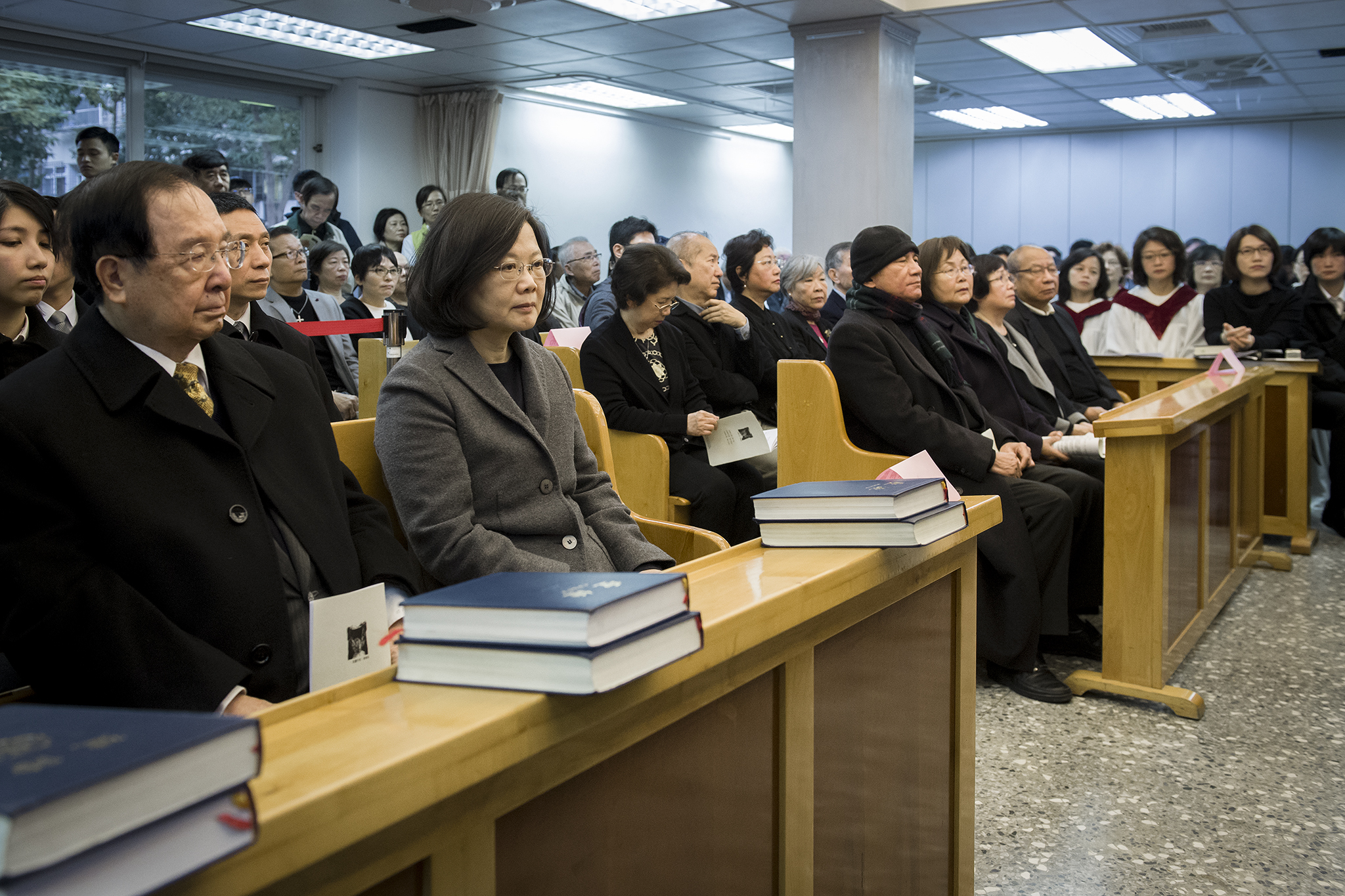
President Tsai Ing-wen attends the annual memorial service at Gikong Presbyterian Church on Feb 28, 2017.

The Gikong or Yi-Kwang Presbyterian Church (義光長老教會) was erected on the site of the former Lin family residence off Hsinyi Road. A memorial service is held annually at the church on February 28. Gikong was founded to provide religious services and comfort for the families of dissidents affected by the Kaohsiung Incident, and later expanded its mission to all political victims.

=== Reinvestigated ===
The case was reopened in 2009 by the Taiwan High Prosecutors Office; it was discovered that a call had been placed from the Lin's home to a restaurant shortly after the murders, but the caller did not speak. No new interviews were conducted for the later investigation, and the investigation was closed after four months. The High Prosecutors Office concluded there was not enough forensic evidence, and further, there was nothing to tie the Taiwan Garrison Command to the crime. The investigation was criticized as a sham, intended only "to prove that security agencies were not behind [the crimes]."

In 2018, the Transitional Justice Commission announced it would investigate the massacre using documents from the Ministry of Justice Investigation Bureau. Some of those records had been damaged in the wake of Typhoon Nari in 2001. For other records belonging to the National Security Bureau, it was not certain that all the requested documents could be declassified.

== Post incident career ==
Lin returned to Taiwan in 1989 and became a major advocate against nuclear power in Taiwan soon after. In 1995, he ran and lost in the Democratic Progressive Party's four-way primary for the 1996 Taiwan presidential election.

Three years later, Lin Yi-hsiung became the 8th Chairperson of Democratic Progressive Party (1998–2000) and successfully ran a campaign for Chen Shui-bian as the 10th President of the Republic of China. Immediately following Chen's election in May 2000, Lin demonstrated his unwillingness to share the spoils of victory in a surprising retirement from DPP's chairmanship. Citing Robert Frost's poem, he retired with the remark that he preferred to take "the road less travelled by".

Leaving all public and party posts behind him, Lin has been concerning himself with 'reform from outside (the centers of power)' as he campaigns for various issues of environmental justice and parliamentary reform, most importantly in mobilizing public support against nuclear power (2000) and for reducing the number of parliamentary seats by half (2004), both of which are detrimental to Chen's and DPP's hold on power.

In late 2005, he encouraged and endorsed Wong Chin-chu's candidacy in the Democratic Progressive Party's chairmanship by-election of 15 January 2006. Some observers considered Wong as the reformist candidate because the two other candidates each represented the then president and premier's factions respectively. Lacking a factional base, however, Wong was only able to marshall 9.4% of the votes.

Less than two weeks later, on 24 January 2006, Lin Yi-hsiung renounced membership of the Democratic Progressive Party of Taiwan. He said the elections of recent years had become partisan dogfights, resulting in national upheaval. He therefore had no intention of serving in the party's administration, nor of running for public office for the party. According to Lin Yi-hsiung, it was no longer meaningful to be a DPP member, and he has chosen to be a non-partisan citizen of his democratic country.

Despite this, Lin endorsed and campaigned for the Democratic Progressive Party's two candidates in the December 2006 mayoral elections. Lin went on the campaign trail for Frank Hsieh (candidate for Mayor of Taipei City) and Chen Chu (candidate for Mayor of Kaohsiung City), both of whom were long time friends of his dating back to the late 1970s. He stated that despite all its vices, the Democratic Progressive Party still remained the most progressive party in Taiwan.

== Notes ==
Party political offices
Preceded by Hsu Hsin-liang	Chairperson of the DPP; 1998–2000	Succeeded by Frank Hsieh
