= George Huang (politician) =

Taiwanese politician (1935–2022)

George Huang Huang Shih-cheng
- 黃石城

Chairman of the Central Election Commission
- In office 17 December 1999 – 16 June 2004
- Preceded by: Huang Chu-wen
- Succeeded by: Chang Cheng-hsiung
- In office 30 July 1994 – 16 June 1995
- Preceded by: Wu Po-hsiung
- Succeeded by: Huang Kun-huei

Changhua County Magistrate
- In office 20 December 1981 – 20 December 1989
- Preceded by: Wu Jung-hsing
- Succeeded by: Chou Ching-yu

Personal details
- Born: 27 August 1935 Ōmura, Inrin, Taichū Prefecture, Taiwan, Empire of Japan (today Dacun, Changhua County, Taiwan)
- Died: 6 May 2022 (aged 86)
- Party: Independent

George Huang (Chinese: 黃石城; 27 August 1935 – 6 May 2022) was a Taiwanese politician. He served two consecutive terms as Changhua County Magistrate from 1981 to 1989 and also chaired the Central Election Commission twice from 1994 to 1995 and between 1999 and 2004.

Huang's daughter, Lisa, has served on the Legislative Yuan. His son David has worked for the Mainland Affairs Council. Outside of politics, Huang served as president of the Chinese Taipei Soccer Association. He also wrote for the Taipei Times. Huang died on 6 May 2022, aged 88.
