= Daniel Hwang =

Taiwanese politician (1953–2022)

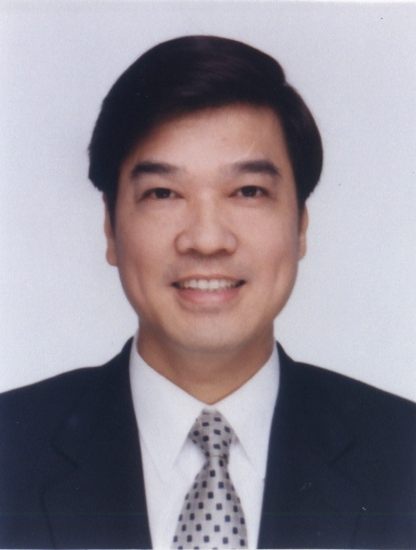
- Hwang in 2008

Member of the Legislative Yuan
- In office 1 January 1999 – 31 January 2012
- Constituency: Taichung 6

Personal details
- Born: 12 March 1953 Huwei Township, Yunlin County, Taiwan
- Died: 17 October 2022 (aged 69) Taipei, Taiwan
- Party: Kuomintang (before 2000); PFP (since 2000)
- Education: Tamkang University; Chinese Culture University

Daniel Hwang (Chinese: 黃義交; 12 March 1953 – 17 October 2022) was a Taiwanese politician. A member of the Kuomintang and the People First Party, he served in the Legislative Yuan from 1999 to 2012.

Hwang died after a fall in his home in Taipei, on 17 October 2022, at the age of 69.
