= Chiu Chuang-chin =

Taiwanese politician

Chiu Chuang-chin MLY
- 邱創進

Member of the Legislative Yuan
- In office 1 February 2002 – 31 January 2008
- Constituency: Changhua County

Personal details
- Born: 12 July 1956 (age 69)
- Education: Feng Chia University (BS); Dayeh University (MS)

Chiu Chuang-chin Chinese: 邱創進; born 12 July 1956) is a Taiwanese politician who served in the Legislative Yuan from 2002 to 2008.

== Education and career ==
Chiu studied architecture at Feng Chia University and completed graduate work at Dayeh University.

Prior to his election to the Legislative Yuan in 2001, Chiu served one term on the Changhua County Council. In May 2002, he accused local Chinese police of extorting visitors from Taiwan. Five months later, it was reported that his visitor's visa to Hong Kong was being delayed, along with the visas of other Democratic Progressive Party lawmakers. In 2003, Chiu softened his stance on China, supporting regulations regarding Taiwan's investment in the Chinese economy. Chiu was reelected to the legislature the in 2004. He lost to Lin Tsang-min in 2008.
