= Wang Huei-mei =

Taiwanese politician

Wang Huei-mei MLY
- 王惠美
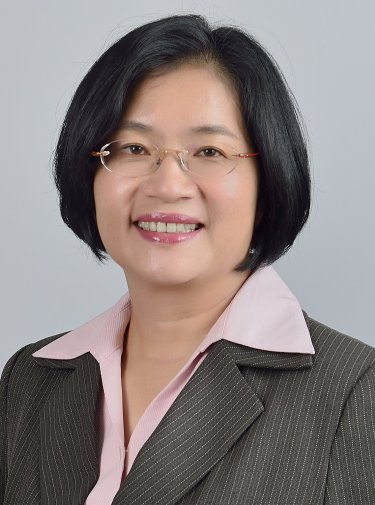
- Official portrait, 2018

11th Magistrate of Changhua
- Incumbent
- Assumed office 25 December 2018
- Deputy: Lin Tian-fu
- Preceded by: Wei Ming-ku

Member of the Legislative Yuan
- In office 1 February 2012 – 25 December 2018
- Preceded by: Chen Hsiu-ching
- Succeeded by: Ko Cheng-fang
- Constituency: Changhua 1

10th Mayor of Lukang
- In office 1 March 2006 – 31 January 2012
- Preceded by: Huang Cheng-lung
- Succeeded by: Chen Shu-chiao (acting); Huang Chen-yen

Changhua County Councillor
- In office 1994–2006

Personal details
- Born: 22 November 1968 (age 57) Xiushui, Changhua County, Taiwan
- Party: Kuomintang
- Education: Tunghai University (BA, MA); National Changhua University of Education (PhD)
- Website: www.lilmei.tw (in Chinese)

Wang Huei-mei (Chinese: 王惠美; pinyin: Wáng Huìměi; Wade–Giles: Wang Hui-mei; born 22 November 1968) is a Taiwanese politician. She is the incumbent Magistrate of Changhua County since 25 December 2018.

== Education ==
Wang graduated from Tunghai University with a bachelor's degree in political science and a master's degree in political science. She then earned a Ph.D. in finance, banking, and business management from the National Changhua University of Education in 2024. Her doctoral dissertation was titled, "Valuation of the Changhua City Railway Elevation Investment Project: Using a substantial option valuation method" (Chinese: 彰化市鐵路高架化投資計畫價值評估： 採實質選擇權評價方法).

== Early careers ==
Wang used to be a teacher for junior high schools and vocational high school, as well as a community college president. She is also an adjunct lecturer at Chienkuo Technology University and Dayeh University.

== Political career ==
Wang was a member of the 13th, 14th and 15th Changhua County Councils. She has also been mayor of Lukang Township.

=== Changhua County magistracy ===
2018 Kuomintang Changhua County magistrate primary results
Candidates	Place	TVBS	Apollo Survey & Research	UDN	Aggregated Result
Wang Huei-mei	Nominated	56.66%	59.78%	55.59%	57.34%
Wu Mingzhe	2nd	22.49%	20.99%	26.35%	23.28%
Yang Fu-di	3rd	20.85%	19.23%	18.06%	19.38%

2018 Changhua County mayoral results
No.	Candidate	Party	Votes	Percentage
1	Wei Ming-ku	Democratic Progressive Party	283,269	39.87%
2	Wang Huei-mei	Kuomintang	377,795	53.18%
3	Pai Ya-tsan	Independent	7,402	1.04%
4	Huang Wen-ling	Independent	34,690	4.88%
5	Hung Min-xiong (洪敏雄)	Independent	7,263	1.02%
Total voters			1,031,222	
Valid votes			710,419	
Invalid votes				
Voter turnout			68.89%	
