= Fang Su-min =

Taiwanese politician

Fang Su-min MLY
- 方素敏

Member of the Legislative Yuan
- In office 1 February 1984 – 31 January 1987
- Constituency: Taiwan 1st district (Taipei County, Keelung, Yilan)

Personal details
- Party: Independent
- Spouse: Lin Yi-hsiung
- Occupation: politician

Fang Su-min (Chinese: 方素敏) is a Taiwanese politician.

== Life and career ==
She is married to Lin Yi-hsiung. Fang visited her imprisoned husband in 1980 and contacted Amnesty International about their meeting, during which Lin disclosed that he had been tortured. After Fang's visit, her twin daughters and mother-in-law were stabbed to death. Fang escaped the stabbing entirely, as she was attending a public hearing held regarding the events of the Kaohsiung Incident, the cause of Lin Yi-hsiung's arrest. Fang and her surviving daughter moved to the United States after the attack. The attack occurred on February 28, 1980 (an anniversary of the 228 Incident) and was widely understood to have been a KMT-government-ordered assassination.

In October 1983, Fang returned to Taiwan and began campaigning for a seat on the Legislative Yuan. The campaign became known as the "holy war of the mother." The Taipei Times wrote in 2000 that Fang contested the election hoping to find out what happened to her family. The publication noted that her campaign was driven by "[s]upporters' tears, anger, and talks of revenge," though Fang said later that she personally "did not have vengeance in my mind." Fang received approximately 121,000 votes in the 1983 election cycle, and won the third most votes overall. During Fang's legislative term, on 15 August 1984, Lin Yi-hsiung was released. A funeral for her mother-in-law and daughters followed in January 1985. As a legislator, she advocated for the release of other prisoners, namely tangwai activist Pai Ya-tsan. After Fang stepped down from the Legislative Yuan, she and Lin established the Chilin Foundation in 1991.
