= Chen Chin-ting =

Taiwanese politician

Cheng Chin-ting MLY
- 陳進丁
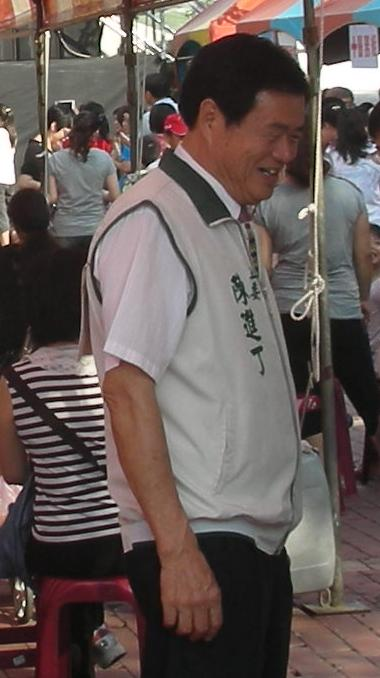

Member of the Legislative Yuan
- In office 1 February 1999 – 31 January 2008
- Constituency: Changhua County

Personal details
- Born: 26 September 1946 (age 79) Fuxing, Changhua, Taiwan
- Party: Democratic Progressive Party
- Other political affiliations: Kuomintang (until 2002); Non-Partisan Solidarity Union (2004–?)
- Education: National Chengchi University (BA); National Chung Hsing University (MPA); Pacific Western University (MBA)

Chen Chin-ting (Chinese: 陳進丁; pinyin: Chén Jìndīng; born 26 September 1946) is a Taiwanese politician who served in the Legislative Yuan from 1999 to 2008.

== Education ==
After high school, Chen graduated from National Chengchi University with a bachelor's degree in business administration. He then earned a Master of Public Administration (M.P.A.) from National Chung Hsing University and a Master of Business Administration (M.B.A.) from Pacific Western University in the United States.

== Political career ==
In his early political career, Chen served as an aid to Li Yuan-tsu. He was first elected to the Legislative Yuan in 1998 and reelected in 2001. Despite his Kuomintang membership, Chen was active in the Alliance for Independent Lawmakers. He was named a member of a new legislative coalition in 2001. However, group leader Lo Fu-chu postponed its formation in July. In June 2002, Chen defied the Kuomintang caucus by submitting his vote on a group of government appointees. For ignoring the Pan-Blue Coalition's attempt to boycott the proceedings, Chen was expelled from the KMT.

In the 2004 legislative elections, Chen ran under the Non-Partisan Solidarity Union, winning a third term. He represented the NPSU in the 2008 elections, but finished second to Chen Hsiu-ching. By 2011, Chen had joined the Democratic Progressive Party and registered for the 2012 legislative elections. He did not win a seat, but the next year he was considered a potential DPP candidate for the Changhua County magistracy, a post eventually won by fellow DPP member Wei Ming-ku. Chen was subsequently named the DPP director for Changhua County.

== Political stances ==
Chen believes the Republic of China and Taiwan to be equivalent entities.
