= 2019 Taiwanese legislative by-elections =

- 27 January 2019 and 16 March 2019

6 of 113 seats in the Legislative Yuan 57 seats needed for a majority
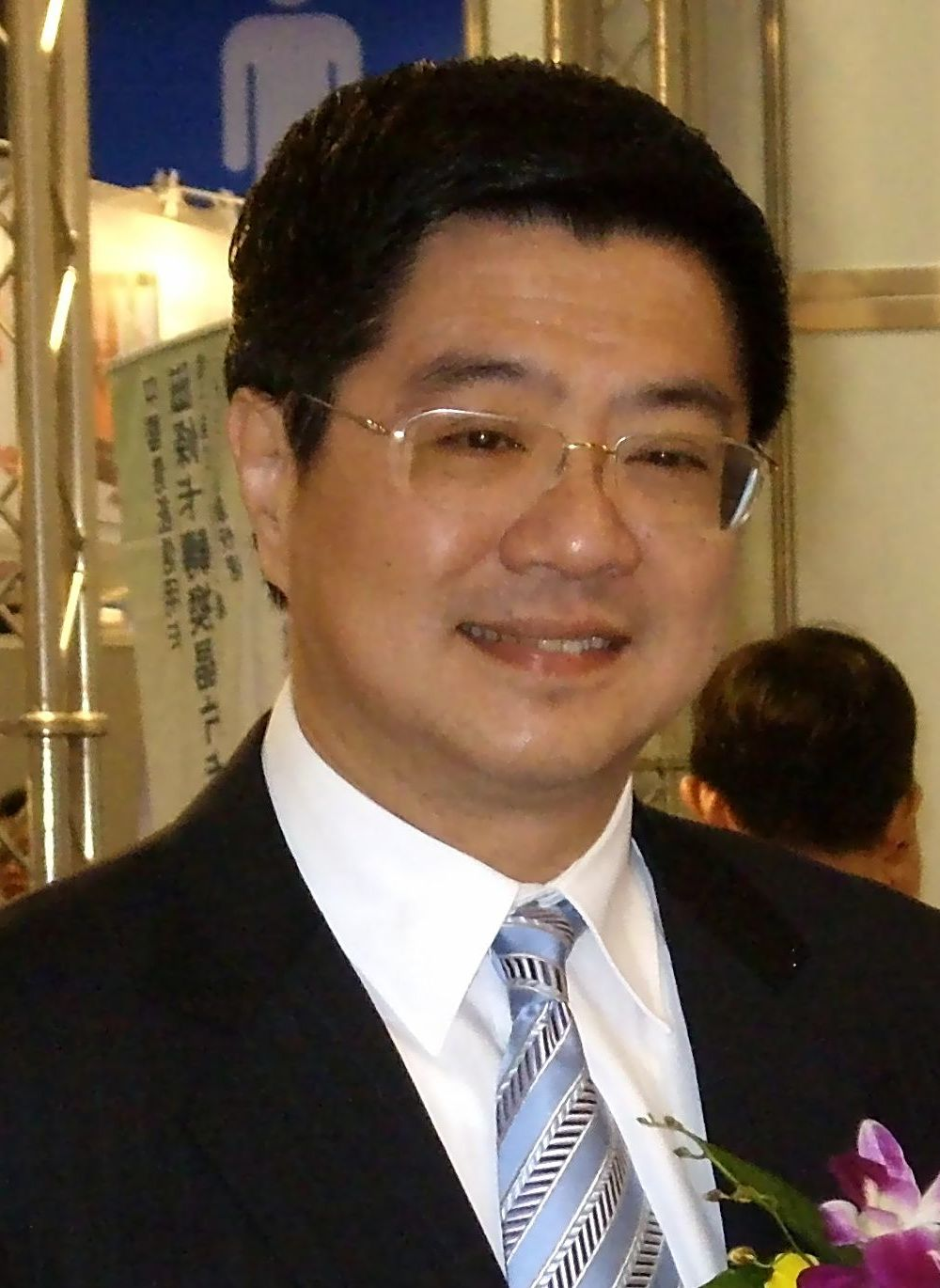

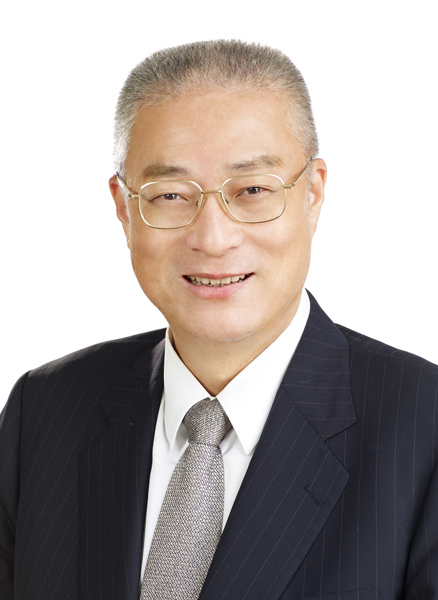
	Majority party	Minority party
Leader	Cho Jung-tai	Wu Den-yih
Party	DPP	KMT
Leader since	9 January 2019	20 August 2017
Last election	68 seats, 44.3% (Note: Average of constituency and party-list votes)	35 seats, 32.9%
Seats before	65	32
Seats won	3	2
Seats after	68	34

By-elections for the Ninth Legislative Yuan were held in 2019, two on 27 January and four on 16 March, at Taiwan to elect 6 of the 113 members of the Legislative Yuan for the remaining term until 2020.

== Background ==
The by-election was the result of resignations by Pasuya Yao, Democratic Progressive Party legislator for Taipei 2; Kuomintang legislator Lu Shiow-yen from Taichung 5; Wang Huei-mei, Kuomintang legislator for Changhua County 1; Huang Wei-cher, Democratic Progressive Party legislator for Tainan 2; and Yang Cheng-wu, Kuomintang legislator for Kinmen County.

All but Yao won election to local offices in the 2018 local election. Under the Article 73 of the Civil Servants Election And Recall Act, if any positions become vacant due to resignation or election to another office, and the vacated term is longer than one year, a by-election shall be completed within three months commencing from the date of resignation.

== Confirmation of by-election ==
On 30 November 2018, the Central Election Commission announced that by-elections for Taipei 2 and Taichung 5 were to be held on 26 January 2019. On 4 December 2018, the CEC moved the date to 27 January 2019, as the previously announced date coincided with the General Scholastic Ability Test. Registration of candidacies for these two seats were open from 10 to 14 December 2018.

By-elections for vacant seats in Changhua County 1, Tainan 2, Kimnen County and New Taipei 3 were scheduled for 16 March 2019.

== Candidates by main parties ==
=== Taipei City Constituency 2 ===
- Democratic Progressive Party called in Taipei councillor Ho Chih-wei to contest the seat
- Kuomintang called in Taipei councillor Chen Bing-fu to contest the seat.
- Independent candidate Chen Si-yu has announced to contest the seat.

=== Taichung City Constituency 5 ===
- Kuomintang had seven candidates indicate interest in contesting the by-election. The party nominated ex-legislator Shen Chih-hwei to contest the seat.
- Democratic Progressive Party has called in Taichung Transportation Bureau director Wang Yi-chuan to contest the seat.

=== Changhua County Constituency 1 ===
- Kuomintang has 3 candidates indicated interest in contesting the by-election. Polls were done, KMT has nominated current Yunlin-Chiayi-Tainan Regional Branch Workforce Development Agency director Ko Cheng-fang to contest the seat.
- Democratic Progressive Party has called in former Lukang Township mayor Huang Chen-yen to contest the seat.

=== Tainan City Constituency 2 ===
- Democratic Progressive Party has called in Kuo Kuo-wen to contest the seat.
- Kuomintang has called in current Tainan councillor Hsieh Lung-chieh
- Independent candidate Chen Hsiao-yu has announced to contest the seat after leaving the Democratic Progressive Party.

=== Kinmen County Constituency ===
- Kuomintang has called in former Kinmen County Council speaker Hung Li-ping
- Independent candidate Chen Yu-chen announced her intentions to contest the seat, and was stripped of her KMT membership.

=== New Taipei City Constituency 3 ===
- Democratic Progressive Party called in New Taipei City branch chairman Yu Tian to contest the seat
- Kuomintang called in KMT Vice Chairman of the Cultural Communication Committee Cheng Shih-wei to contest the seat.

== Opinion Polls ==
=== Taipei City Constituency 2 ===
Poll Organization	Date of completion	Ho Chih-wei	Chen Bing-fu	Chen Si-yu	Wang Yi-kai	Undecided
TVBS	December 21, 2018	32%	23%	10%	4%	31%
ETtoday	December 27, 2018	24.5%	32.0%	15.5%	-	28%
Formosa	January 6, 2019	28.3%	18.8%	10.3%	2.4%	11%

=== Taichung City Constituency 5 ===
Poll Organization	Date of completion	Shen Chih-hwei	Wang Yi-chuan	Chiu Yu-shan	Undecided
ETtoday	December 28, 2018	44.3%	19.2%	7.3%	22.8%

=== Tainan City Constituency 2 ===
Poll Organization	Date of completion	Hsieh Lung-jie	Kuo Kuo-wen	Chen Hsiao-yu	Undecided
China Times	25 February 2019	34.9%	24.3%	11.9%	28.9%
TVBS	4 March 2019	38%	26%	13%	23%
Formosa	5 March 2019	29.1%	22.1%	8.8%	40.1%

=== New Taipei City Constituency 3 ===
Poll Organization	Date of completion	Cheng Shih-wei	Yu Tian	Su Ching-yen	Undecided
DPP	30 January 2019	23.1%	41.0%	4.3%	31.6%
DPP	14 February 2019	23.4%	41.0%	4.2%	31.4%
China Times	25 February 2019	39.3%	33.2%	3.0%	24.5%
TVBS	4 March 2019	40%	36%	3%	21%

== Results ==
=== Taipei 2 ===
Voted on 27 January 2019.

Candidate	Party	Votes	%
Ho Chih-wei	Democratic Progressive Party	38,591	47.76
Chen Bing-fu	Kuomintang	31,532	39.03
Chen Si-yu	Independent	9,689	11.99
Wang Yi-kai	Independent	897	1.11
Chen Yuan-chi	National Non-Party Union	89	0.11
Total		80,798	100.00
Valid votes		80,798	99.62
Invalid/blank votes		309	0.38
Total votes		81,107	100.00
Registered voters/turnout		266,907	30.39

=== Taichung 5 ===
Voted on 27 January 2019.

Candidate	Party	Votes	%
Shen Chih-hwei	Kuomintang	49,230	57.78
Wang Yi-chuan	Democratic Progressive Party	32,903	38.62
Chiu Yu-shan	Independent	2,910	3.42
Lin Chung-sheng	United Party	157	0.18
Total		85,200	100.00
Valid votes		85,200	99.51
Invalid/blank votes		421	0.49
Total votes		85,621	100.00
Registered voters/turnout		337,848	25.34

=== New Taipei 3 ===
Voted on 16 March 2019.

Candidate	Party	Votes	%
Yu Tian	Democratic Progressive Party	56,888	52.04
Cheng Shih-wei	Kuomintang	51,127	46.77
Su Ching-yen	Independent	1,303	1.19
Total		109,318	100.00
Valid votes		109,318	99.44
Invalid/blank votes		621	0.56
Total votes		109,939	100.00
Registered voters/turnout		261,154	42.10

=== Changhua 1 ===
Voted on 16 March 2019.

Candidate	Party	Votes	%
Ko Cheng-fang	Kuomintang	47,835	52.11
Huang Chen-yen	Democratic Progressive Party	41,946	45.69
Chi Ching-tang	Independent	2,022	2.20
Total		91,803	100.00
Valid votes		91,803	99.34
Invalid/blank votes		608	0.66
Total votes		92,411	100.00
Registered voters/turnout		252,529	36.59

=== Tainan 2 ===
Voted on 16 March 2019.

Candidate	Party	Votes	%
Kuo Kuo-wen	Democratic Progressive Party	62,858	47.05
Hsieh Lung-jie	Kuomintang	59,194	44.31
Chen Hsiao-yu	Independent	10,424	7.80
Yang Hsiao-ju	Independent	492	0.37
Wu Ping-hui	Independent	350	0.26
Hsu Kuo-tong	Independent	269	0.20
Total		133,587	100.00
Valid votes		133,587	99.49
Invalid/blank votes		688	0.51
Total votes		134,275	100.00
Registered voters/turnout		301,571	44.53

=== Kinmen ===
Voted on 16 March 2019.

Candidate	Party	Votes	%
Chen Yu-chen	Independent	7,117	28.69
Chen Tsang-chiang	Independent	6,020	24.27
Hung Li-ping	Kuomintang	5,681	22.90
Tsai Hsi-hu	Independent	5,175	20.86
Lu Kuan-yu	Independent	570	2.30
Hung Chih-heng	Kinmen Sorghum Party	240	0.97
Total		24,803	100.00
Valid votes		24,803	99.34
Invalid/blank votes		165	0.66
Total votes		24,968	100.00
Registered voters/turnout		117,730	21.21
