= Chen Hsiu-ching =

Taiwanese politician

Chen Hsiu-ching MLY
- 陳秀卿

Member of the Legislative Yuan
- In office 1 February 2005 – 22 April 2011
- Succeeded by: Wang Huei-mei
- Constituency: Changhua County→Changhua 1

Personal details
- Born: 25 October 1950 Changhua County, Taiwan
- Died: 22 April 2011 (aged 60) Lukang, Changhua, Taiwan
- Party: Kuomintang

Chen Hsiu-ching (Chinese: 陳秀卿; pinyin: Chén Xiùqīng; 25 October 1950 – 22 April 2011) was a Taiwanese politician.

== Education and career ==
She earned an Executive Master of Business Administration degree from Changhua Normal University and was first elected to the Legislative Yuan in 2004. She won reelection against Chen Chin-ting of the Non-Partisan Solidarity Union in 2008, winning 44.96% of the vote. The Congress Watch Foundation rated Chen Hsiu-ching one of the worst legislators in July 2008. In 2009, she opposed an amendment to the Nationality Act proposed by Wu Yu-sheng that would have barred people holding permanent residency in another country from running for public office in Taiwan. Chen died in office at the age of 60 on 22 April 2011, of adenocarcinoma of the lung.

Outside of politics, Chen also served as spokesperson for the Kuang Feng Farmers' Association, and frequently played the role of Mazu on television.
