= List of county magistrates of Changhua =

The Changhua County Magistrate is the chief executive of the Changhua County government in Taiwan. Initially magistrates were appointed by the Taiwan Provincial Government, but from 1951 the role has been directly elected by the population of Changhua County. The current magistrate is Wang Huei-mei of Kuomintang since 25 December 2018.

== Appointed magistrates ==
Term	Name	Political party	Term of office		Notes
1	Chen Hsi-ching	Kuomintang	21 December 1950	7 February 1951	
acting	Chiang Chi-wu	Kuomintang	7 February 1951	1 June 1951	

== Directly elected magistrates ==
In the multi-party era (1987 onwards) the post has been held five times by the Kuomintang and thrice by the Democratic Progressive Party. Under current rules magistrates serve four-year terms, and can stand for re-election once.

Kuomintang Independent Democratic Progressive Party

№	Portrait	Name (Birth–Death)	Term of Office		Term	Political Party
1		Chen Hsi-ching 陳錫卿; Chén Xíqīng (1907-1985)	1 June 1951	2 June 1954	1	Kuomintang
1		Chen Hsi-ching 陳錫卿; Chén Xíqīng (1907-1985)	2 June 1954	2 June 1957	2	Kuomintang
1		Chen Hsi-ching 陳錫卿; Chén Xíqīng (1907-1985)	2 June 1957	2 June 1960	3	Kuomintang
2		Lu Shih-ming 呂世明; Lǚ Shìmíng (1901-1992)	2 June 1960	2 June 1964	4	Kuomintang
2		Lu Shih-ming 呂世明; Lǚ Shìmíng (1901-1992)	2 June 1964	2 June 1968	5	Kuomintang
3		Chen Shih-ying 陳時英; Chén Shíyīng (1926-1995)	2 June 1968	7 June 1971	6	Kuomintang
—		Li Feng-chih 李豐之; Lǐ Fēngzhī	7 June 1971	1 February 1973	6	Kuomintang
4		Wu Jung-hsing 吳榮興; Wú Róngxīng (1925-2014)	1 February 1973	20 December 1977	7	Kuomintang
4		Wu Jung-hsing 吳榮興; Wú Róngxīng (1925-2014)	20 December 1977	20 December 1981	8	Kuomintang
5		George Huang 黃石城; Huáng Shíchéng (1935-2022)	20 December 1981	30 May 1985	9	Independent
5		George Huang 黃石城; Huáng Shíchéng (1935-2022)	20 December 1985	20 December 1989	10	Independent
6		Chou Ching-yu 周清玉; Zhōu Qīngyǜ (1944-)	20 December 1989	20 December 1993	11	Democratic Progressive Party
7		Juan Kang-meng 阮剛猛; Ruǎn Gāngměng (1951-)	20 December 1993	20 December 1997	12	Kuomintang
7		Juan Kang-meng 阮剛猛; Ruǎn Gāngměng (1951-)	20 December 1997	20 December 2001	13	Kuomintang
8		Wong Chin-chu 翁金珠; Wēng Jīnzhū (1947-)	20 December 2001	20 December 2005	14	Democratic Progressive Party
9		Cho Po-yuan 卓伯源; Zhuō Bóyuán (1965-)	20 December 2005	20 December 2009	15	Kuomintang
9		Cho Po-yuan 卓伯源; Zhuō Bóyuán (1965-)	20 December 2009	25 December 2014	16	Kuomintang
10		Wei Ming-ku 魏明谷; Wèi Mínggǔ (1963-)	25 December 2014	25 December 2018	17	Democratic Progressive Party
11		Wang Huei-mei 王惠美; Wáng Huìměi (1968-)	25 December 2018	25 December 2022	18	Kuomintang
11		Wang Huei-mei 王惠美; Wáng Huìměi (1968-)	25 December 2022	Incumbent	19	Kuomintang
