= Chen Hsiu-pao =

Taiwanese politician

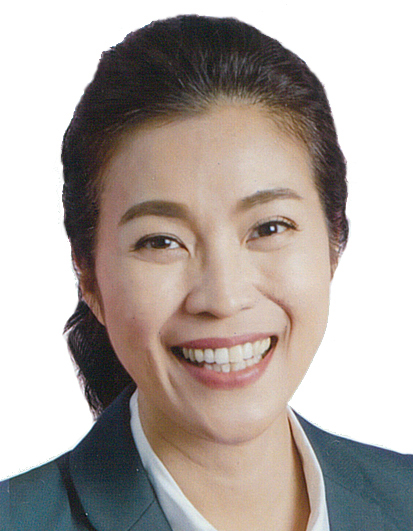
Chen in 2019

Chen Hsiu-pao (Chinese: 陳秀寶; 11 October 1972) is a Taiwanese politician.

== Education ==
Chen was born on 11 October 1972. She attended elementary and middle school in Fuxing, Changhua, then graduated from Ching Cheng High School and Chienkuo Technology University, in Changhua City.

== Political career ==
Chen began her political career as a legislative assistant to her father, Chen Chin-ting. She was a member of the Changhua County Council from 2010 to 2020. Chen vacated her county council seat in 2020, after winning election to the 10th Legislative Yuan.
