= Huang Hsiu-fang =

Taiwanese politician (born 1971)

Huang Hsiu-fang MLY
- 黃秀芳
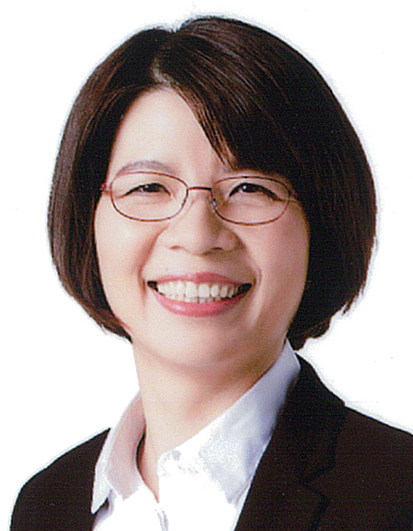
- Huang in November 2015

Member of the Legislative Yuan
- Incumbent
- Assumed office 1 February 2016
- Preceded by: Lin Tsang-min
- Constituency: Changhua 2

Personal details
- Born: 10 November 1971 (age 54) Changhua County, Taiwan
- Party: Democratic Progressive Party
- Education: Providence University (BA); Tunghai University (MA)

Huang Hsiu-fang (Chinese: 黃秀芳; pinyin: Huáng Xiùfāng; born 10 November 1971) is a Taiwanese politician.

Before entering politics, Huang graduated from Providence University with a bachelor's degree in foreign languages and literature, then earned a master's degree in human resource management from Tunghai University. She was named a Democratic Progressive Party candidate for Changhua County in the 2012 legislative elections, but lost to Lin Tsang-min. She was elected to the Legislative Yuan in 2016. In June 2022, Huang received the DPP nomination for the Changhua County magistracy.
