= Dayeh University =

University in Dacun Township, Taiwan

- 大葉大學
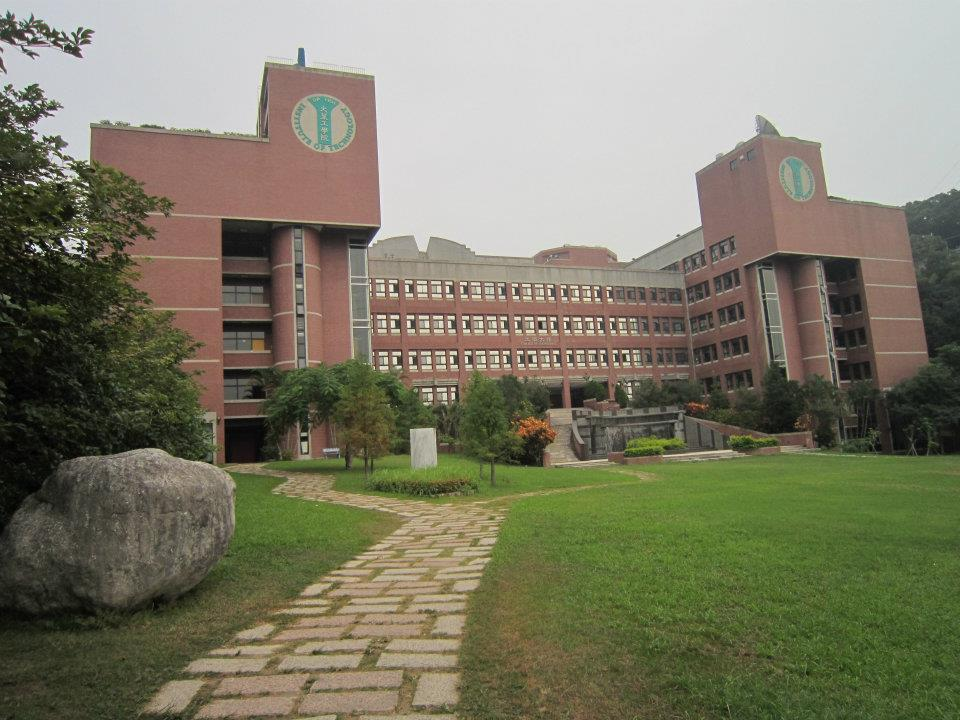
- Motto: 手腦並用、敬業樂羣(Pe̍h-ōe-jī: Chhiú-náu pēng-iōng, Kèng-gia̍p Lo̍k-kûn)
- Motto in English: Using the hands and mind together; dedicated and gregarious
- Type: Private university
- Established: 1990
- President: Liang Cho-chung
- Provost: Dr. Meiling Chen
- Academic staff: 583
- Administrative staff: 223
- Students: 11,211 (2013, Oct.)
- Undergraduates: 9,202
- Postgraduates: 2,009
- Location: Dacun, Changhua County, Taiwan; 24°0′0″N 120°35′46″E
- Campus: Dacun
- Website: www.dyu.edu.tw

Dayeh University
- Traditional Chinese: 大葉大學
Transcriptions
Standard Mandarin
- Hanyu Pinyin: Dàyè Dàxué
Southern Min
- Hokkien POJ: Tāi-ia̍p Tāi-ha̍k

Dayeh University (DYU; Chinese: 大葉大學; Pe̍h-ōe-jī: Tāi-ia̍p Tāi-ha̍k) is a private university in Dacun Township, Changhua County, Taiwan, and accredited by ACCSB.

== History ==
The school was established in 1990 as Dayeh Institute of Technology by Song Gen Yeh who wanted to establish the first German-style polytechnic in Taiwan.

In August 1997, Dayeh's status as a university was approved by the Ministry of Education and it was renamed Dayeh University.

In 2007, Dayeh University won the National Solar Model Car Race. This event was organized by the Ministry of Education and attracted 41 teams from 21 local universities and colleges.

This university is the home to over 11,211 students, who study in 6 different disciplines offered by the six different colleges from the university. These colleges are:

- College of Engineering
- College of Design and Arts
- College of Management
- College of Foreign Languages
- College of Biotechnology and Bio-resources
- College of Tourism and Hospitality

The College of Nursing and Health Science was fully established in 2014. DYU has been awarded with Teaching Excellence Project from Taiwan Ministry of Education in the last few years indicating overall high teaching quality, excellent management and great potential of DYU.

Dayeh has been the host to many important events, including the 29th University and College Games, the 1st University and College College Club Expo, University President Conference, Hundred Industry Partnership-Strategy Alliances Fair, Ceremony for Industry-Academic Partnership Establishment, just to name a few.

In addition, DYU has also been awarded with Teaching Excellence Project from Ministry of Education in consecutive years, which indicates the overall teaching standard, management and potential of DYU.

DYU has performed well in academic research in recent years. According to the statistics of frequency on ESI papers in Taiwan, papers from the College of Engineering are quoted as many times as top 1% of the world. WOS statistics on papers also indicate the research potential in the areas of Mechanics, Agriculture, Materials, Biology and Immunology at DYU. The ranking of DYU has been improved to one of the world top 6% universities according to Webometrics from Span in January 2011. Exhibition of Inventions in Germany, Moscow Archimedes International Exhibition of Inventions in Russia, International Exhibition of Inventions in Italy, International Competition of Micro Institutions in Japan, and Seoul Female Film Festival in Korea. Recently at the Taipei Invention competition, students from various departments came together to represent Dayeh University. Students and Professors represented the university in the booths as shown below: BSc. Biotechnology Students, BSc. Electrical Engineering Students, Environmental Engineering Students of H801, Professor Lee: Mr. Hung (PhD candidate), Mr. Liao (Phd candidate), Mr. Elon Cadogan (PhD candidate), Mr. Huang (MSc.), Mr. Yang MSc., Founder of DaYeh University, Vice President of DaYeh University. Dean, Office of Research & Development Distinguished Professor Chen, Assistant to the Dean.

== Notable alumni ==
- Lego Lee, actor
- Wei Ming-ku, Magistrate of Changhua County
- Jasper Liu, actor, model and singer
- Wei Ming-ku, politician

== See also ==
- List of universities in Taiwan
