= Wei Ming-ku =

Taiwanese politician

- 魏明谷
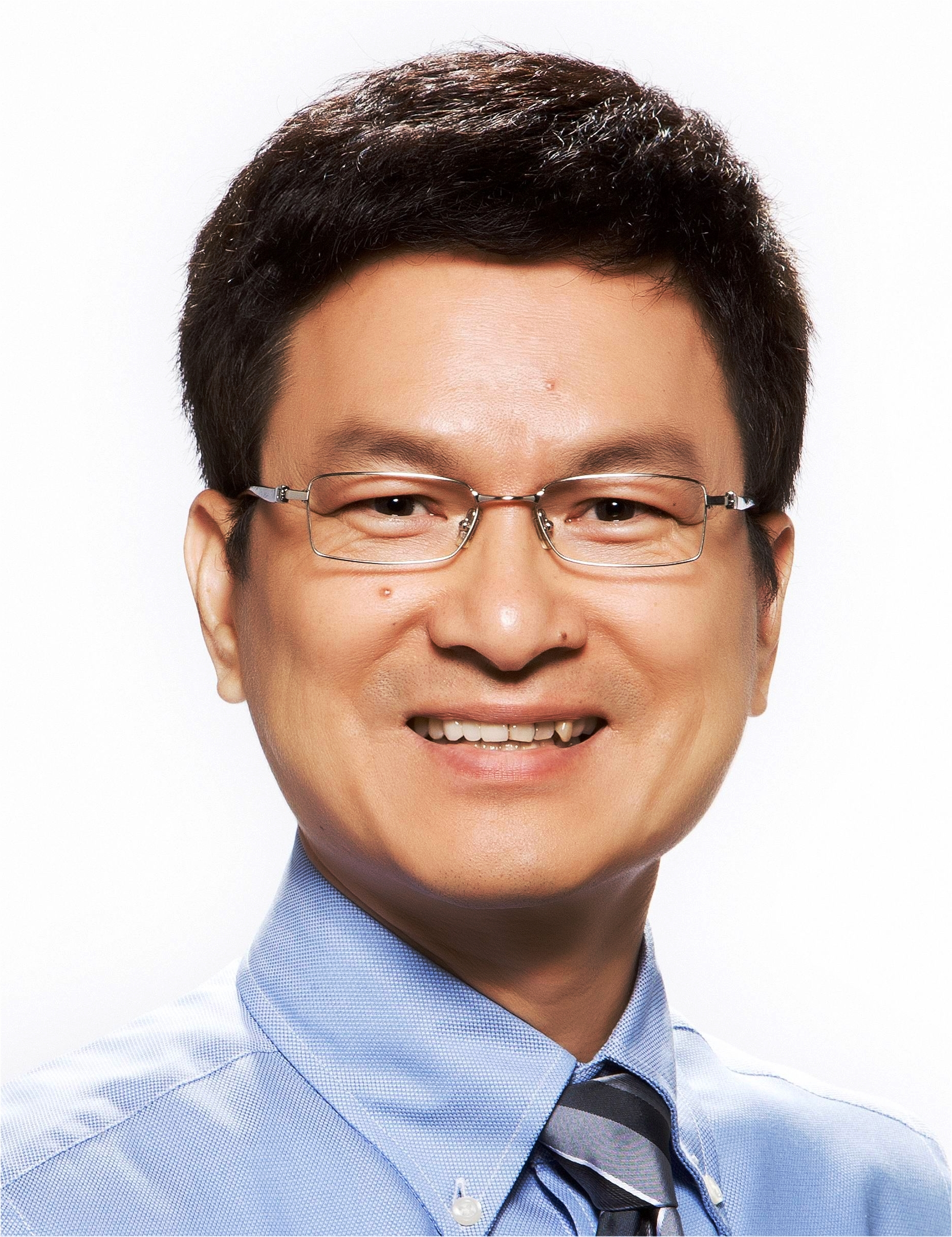
- Official portrait, 2014

National Policy Advisor to the President
- Incumbent
- Assumed office 9 February 2021
- President: Tsai Ing-wen

10th Magistrate of Changhua County
- In office 25 December 2014 – 25 December 2018
- Deputy: See list: Lin Ming-yu Chen Hsan-bao
- Preceded by: Cho Po-yuan
- Succeeded by: Wang Huei-mei

Member of the Legislative Yuan
- In office 1 February 2012 – 25 December 2014
- Preceded by: Hsiao Ching-tien
- Succeeded by: Chen Su-yueh
- Constituency: Changhua 4
- In office 1 February 2002 – 31 January 2008
- Constituency: Changhua County

Personal details
- Born: 18 March 1963 (age 63) Puxin, Changhua County, Taiwan
- Party: Democratic Progressive Party
- Education: National Taichung University of Science and Technology (BS); Dayeh University (MBA)

Wei Ming-ku (Chinese: 魏明谷; pinyin: Wèi Mínggǔ; born 18 March 1963) is a Taiwanese politician. He served in the Legislative Yuan from 2002 to 2008 and again from 2012 until 2014, when he was elected Magistrate of Changhua County.

== Education ==
Wei received his bachelor's degree in business from National Taichung University of Science and Technology and master's degree in business management from Dayeh University.

== Magistrate of Changhua County ==
=== 2014 Changhua County magistrate election ===
Wei won the 2014 Changhua County magistrate election held on 29 November 2014.

2014 Changhua County Magistrate Election Result
No.	Candidate	Party	Votes	Percentage
1	Lisa Huang	Independent	37,593	5.23%
2	Hung Min-hsiung (洪敏雄)	Independent	10,674	1.48%
3	Wei Ming-ku	DPP	386,405	53.71%
4	Lin Tsang-min (林滄敏)	KMT	284,738	39.58%

=== 2016 Japan visit ===
In August–September 2016, Wei led a business delegation to Japan to promote trade and investment in Changhua County. He also studied the development of the Abeno-ku area.

=== 2018 Changhua County magistrate election ===
2018 Democratic Progressive Party Changhua County magistrate primary results
Candidates	Place	Result
Wei Ming-ku	Called In	Walkover

2018 Changhua County magistrate election results
No.	Candidate	Party	Votes	Percentage
1	Wei Ming-ku	Democratic Progressive Party	283,269	39.87%
2	Wang Huei-mei	Kuomintang	377,795	53.18%
3	Pai Ya-tsan	Independent	7,402	1.04%
4	Huang Wen-ling	Independent	34,690	4.88%
5	Hung Min-xiong (洪敏雄)	Independent	7,263	1.02%
Total voters			1,031,222	
Valid votes			710,419	
Invalid votes				
Voter turnout			68.89%	
