= Cho Po-yuan =

Taiwanese politician

- 卓伯源
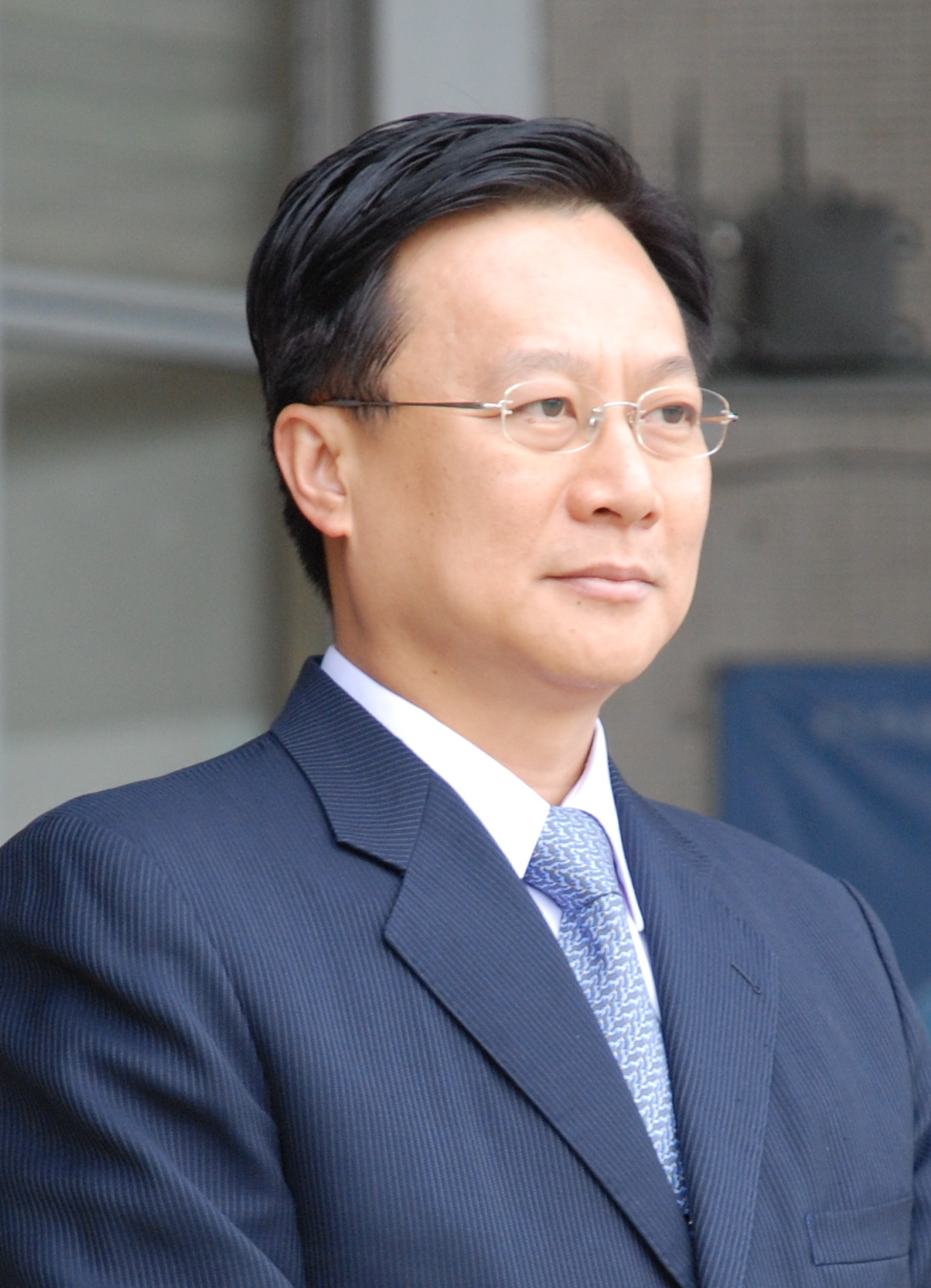
- Cho in 2008

9th Magistrate of Changhua
- In office 20 December 2005 – 25 December 2014
- Preceded by: Wong Chin-chu
- Succeeded by: Wei Ming-ku

Member of the Legislative Yuan
- In office 1 February 2002 – 19 December 2005
- Constituency: Changhua at-large

Personal details
- Born: 27 March 1965 (age 60) Tianzhong, Changhua County, Taiwan
- Political party: Kuomintang
- Spouse: Lin Jung-jung (林蓉蓉)
- Education: National Taiwan University (LLB); National Taiwan Ocean University (LLM)

Cho Po-yuan (Chinese: 卓伯源; pinyin: Zhuō Bóyuán; born 27 March 1965) is a Taiwanese politician. He was the Magistrate of Changhua County from 2005 to 2014.

== Early life and education ==
Cho was born on March 27, 1965, in Changhua. He attended law school at National Taiwan University, where he graduated with a Bachelor of Laws (LL.B.) degree, then earned a Master of Laws (LL.M.) from National Taiwan Ocean University.

== Changhua County Magistrate ==
=== Changhua County Magistrate election ===
Cho was elected as the Magistrate of Changhua County after winning the 2005 Taiwan (ROC) local election under Kuomintang on 3 December 2005 and assumed office on 20 December 2005. He was then reelected for the second term after winning the 2009 Taiwan (ROC) local election on 5 December 2009 and took office on 20 December 2009.

=== Allegation of graft ===
Cho is currently under investigation for allegations of graft; his brother has been detained by police.

== Later political career ==
Cho finished fourth of four candidates in the 2021 Kuomintang chairmanship election. He contested the 2025 Kuomintang chairmanship election as well, finishing fifth of six candidates.

Government offices
Preceded by Wong Chin-chu	Changhua County Magistrate; 2005–2014	Succeeded by Wei Ming-ku
