= 2008 Taiwanese legislative election =

- 12 January 2008

All 113 seats in the Legislative Yuan 57 seats needed for a majority
- Registered: 17,179,656 (Note: District and aboriginal electorate; party-list electorate size was 17,288,551)
- Turnout: 58.50% (▼0.85pp) (Note: District and aboriginal electorate; party-list voter turnout was 58.28%)
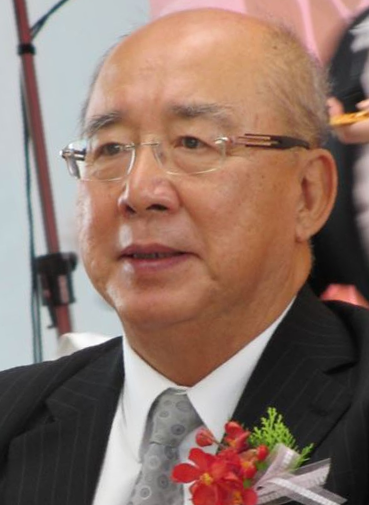

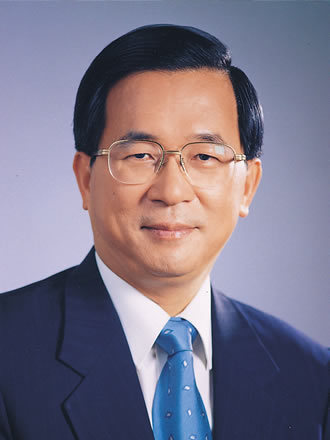
	Majority party	Minority party
Leader	Wu Po-hsiung	Chen Shui-bian
Party	KMT	DPP
Alliance	Pan-Blue	Pan-Green
Last election	79 seats	89 seats
Seats won	81	27
Seat change	▲2	▼62
Constituency vote	5,291,512; 53.50%	3,775,352; 38.17%
Party vote	5,010,801; 51.23%	3,610,106; 36.91%
- Vote share by constituencies

- Election cartogram

Legislative elections were held in Taiwan on 12 January 2008 to elect the members of the Legislative Yuan. It was the first Legislative Yuan election after the constitutional amendments of 2005, which extended term length from three to four years, reduced seat count from 225 to 113, and introduced the current electoral system.

The results gave the Kuomintang (KMT) and the Pan-Blue Coalition a supermajority (86 of the 113 seats) in the legislature, handing a heavy defeat to then-President Chen Shui-bian's Democratic Progressive Party, which won the remaining 27 seats only. The junior partner in the Pan-Green Coalition, the Taiwan Solidarity Union, won no seats.

Two transitional justice referendums, both of which failed to pass due to low turnout, were held at the same time.

== Legislature reform ==
For the first time in the history of Taiwan, most members of the Legislative Yuan were to be elected from single-member districts: 73 of the 113 members were chosen in such districts by the plurality voting system (first-past-the-post). Parallel to the single member constituencies (not compensating for disproportionality in single-member districts), 34 seats were elected in one national district by party-list proportional representation. For these seats, only political parties whose votes exceed a five percent threshold were eligible for the allocation. Six further seats were reserved for Taiwanese aborigines. Therefore, each elector had two ballots under parallel voting.

The aboriginal members were elected by single non-transferable vote in two 3-member constituencies for lowland aborigines and highland aborigines respectively. This did not fulfill the promise in the treaty-like document A New Partnership Between the Indigenous Peoples and the Government of Taiwan, where each of the 13 recognized indigenous peoples was to get at least one seat, and the distinction between highland and lowland abolished.

The breakdown by administrative unit was:

Jurisdiction	Seats	Jurisdiction	Seats	Jurisdiction	Seats
Taipei City	8	Taichung City	3	Kaohsiung County	4
Kaohsiung City	5	Changhua County	4	Pingtung County	3
Taipei County	12	Yunlin County	2	Yilan County	1
Keelung City	1	Nantou County	2	Hualien County	1
Taoyuan County	6	Chiayi County	2	Taitung County	1
Hsinchu City	1	Chiayi City	1	Penghu County	1
Hsinchu County	1	Tainan County	3	Kinmen County	1
Miaoli County	2	Tainan City	2	Lienchiang County	1
Taichung County	5				

The delimitation of the single-member constituencies within the cities and counties was a major political issue, with bargaining between the government and the legislature. Of the 15 cities and counties to be partitioned (the ten others have only one seat), only seven of the districting schemes proposed by the CEC were approved in a normal way. The eight other schemes were decided by drawing lots: "Taipei and Taichung cities and Miaoli and Changhua counties will adopt the version suggested by the CEC, while Kaohsiung city will follow the consensus of the legislature. Taipei county will follow the proposal offered by the opposition Taiwan Solidarity Union, Taoyuan county will adopt the ruling Democratic Progressive Party's scheme, and Pingtung county will use the scheme agreed upon by the Non-partisan Solidarity Union, People First Party, Kuomintang and Taiwan Solidarity Union."

== Impact of the electoral system ==
The elections were the first held under a new electoral system which had been approved by both major parties in constitutional amendments adopted in 2005, but which one political scientist has argued favored the KMT. The rules are set up so that every county has at least one seat, which gave a higher representation for smaller counties in which the KMT traditionally has done well. Northern counties tend to be marginally in favor of KMT, whereas southern counties tend to be strongly for DPP, and the single member system limits this advantage. The partially led to the result that the legislative count was highly in favor of the KMT while the difference in the number of votes cast for the KMT and DPP were less dramatic.

It was considered possible that the 2008 Taiwanese presidential election would be held on the same day as this election, but this was eventually not the case, with the presidential happening 10 weeks later, in March. Two referendums were held on the same date.

== Results ==
Party	Party-list			Constituency/Aboriginal			Total seats
Party	Votes	%	Seats	Votes	%	Seats	Total seats
Kuomintang (Note: In a pre-election agreement, the Kuomintang and the People First Party agreed to register most PFP constituency candidates as KMT candidates, and nominate a common KMT party list, in order to prevent splitting of the Pan-Blue vote. The PFP won one aboriginal seat it contested under its own name, five constituency seats contested under the KMT banner, and three seats within the KMT party list.) (Note: Under New Party direction, all New Party legislators in the outgoing legislature had joined the KMT, and New Party members ran as KMT candidates with New Party endorsement in this election. The New Party ran only party list candidates in this election but failed to pass the 5% threshold.)	5,010,801	51.23	20	5,291,512	53.50	61	81
Democratic Progressive Party	3,610,106	36.91	14	3,775,352	38.17	13	27
New Party	386,660	3.95	0				0
Taiwan Solidarity Union	344,887	3.53	0	93,840	0.95	0	0
Home Party	77,870	0.80	0	6,355	0.06	0	0
Non-Partisan Solidarity Union	68,527	0.70	0	239,317	2.42	3	3
Green Party Taiwan	58,473	0.60	0	14,767	0.15	0	0
Taiwan Farmers' Party	57,144	0.58	0	8,681	0.09	0	0
Civil Party	48,192	0.49	0	6,562	0.07	0	0
Third Society Party	45,594	0.47	0	10,057	0.10	0	0
Hakka Party	42,004	0.43	0	8,860	0.09	0	0
Taiwan Constitution Association	30,315	0.31	0	3,926	0.04	0	0
People First Party				28,254	0.29	1	1
Democratic Liberal Party				5,094	0.05	0	0
Great Mercy and Charity Party				3,783	0.04	0	0
Hongyun Loyalty Party				581	0.01	0	0
World Peace Party				489	0.00	0	0
Independents (Note: Chen Fu-hai of Kinmen, the lone independent elected in this election, is a former KMT member and endorsed the KMT presidential campaign. Hence the strength of the Pan-Blue coalition is taken as 86.)				393,346	3.98	1	1
Total	9,780,573	100.00	34	9,890,776	100.00	79	113
Valid votes	9,780,573	97.07		9,890,776	98.41		
Invalid/blank votes	295,666	2.93		159,843	1.59		
Total votes	10,076,239	100.00		10,050,619	100.00		
Registered voters/turnout	17,288,551	58.28		17,179,656	58.50		
Source: Election Study Center, CEC

=== Legislators elected through constituency and aborigine ballots ===
Kuomintang
Democratic Progressive Party
Non-Partisan Solidarity Union
Independent

Constituency	Elected candidate(s)	Popular vote
Taipei City Constituency 1	Ting Shou-chung	59.81%
Taipei City Constituency 2	Justin Chou	52.39%
Taipei City Constituency 3	John Chiang	60.25%
Taipei City Constituency 4	Alex Tsai	62.25%
Taipei City Constituency 5	Lin Yu-fang	58.24%
Taipei City Constituency 6	Diane Lee	66.80%
Taipei City Constituency 7	Alex Fai	65.79%
Taipei City Constituency 8	Lai Shyh-bao	71.81%
Kaohsiung City Constituency 1	Huang Chao-shun	58.29%
Kaohsiung City Constituency 2	Kuan Bi-ling	48.84%
Kaohsiung City Constituency 3	Hou Tsai-feng	49.13%
Kaohsiung City Constituency 4	Lee Fu-hsing	51.32%
Kaohsiung City Constituency 5	Kuo Wen-chen	46.01%
Taipei County Constituency 1	Wu Yu-sheng	58.38%
Taipei County Constituency 2	Lin Shu-fen	43.17%
Taipei County Constituency 3	Yu Tian	49.51%
Taipei County Constituency 4	Lee Hung-chun	51.73%
Taipei County Constituency 5	Huang Chih-hsiung	52.32%
Taipei County Constituency 6	Lin Hung-chih	56.93%
Taipei County Constituency 7	Wu Chin-chih	55.82%
Taipei County Constituency 8	Chang Ching-chung	59.55%
Taipei County Constituency 9	Lin Te-fu	69.61%
Taipei County Constituency 10	Lu Chia-chen	60.10%
Taipei County Constituency 11	Lo Ming-tsai	69.69%
Taipei County Constituency 12	Lee Ching-hua	51.96%
Keelung City	Hsieh Kuo-liang	67.79%
Yilan County	Lin Chien-jung	53.12%
Taoyuan County Constituency 1	Chen Ken-te	61.76%
Taoyuan County Constituency 2	Liao Cheng-ching	54.57%
Taoyuan County Constituency 3	John Wu	63.22%
Taoyuan County Constituency 4	Yang Li-huan	62.42%
Taoyuan County Constituency 5	Chu Fong-chi	63.76%
Taoyuan County Constituency 6	Sun Ta-chien	65.02%
Hsinchu County	Chiu Ching-chun	66.52%
Hsinchu City	Lu Hsueh-chang	60.61%
Miaoli County Constituency 1	Lee Yi-ting	58.01%
Miaoli County Constituency 2	Hsu Yao-chang	45.62%
Taichung County Constituency 1	Liu Chuan-chung	53.59%
Taichung County Constituency 2	Yen Ching-piao	59.94%
Taichung County Constituency 3	Chiang Lien-fu	54.95%
Taichung County Constituency 4	Shyu Jong-shyong	64.00%
Taichung County Constituency 5	Yang Chiung-ying	57.68%
Taichung City Constituency 1	Tsai Chin-lung	61.29%
Taichung City Constituency 2	Lu Shiow-yen	57.08%
Taichung City Constituency 3	Daniel Huang	54.91%
Changhua County Constituency 1	Chen Hsiu-ching	44.96%
Changhua County Constituency 2	Lin Tsang-min	60.02%
Changhua County Constituency 3	Cheng Ru-fen	45.33%
Changhua County Constituency 4	Hsiao Ching-tien	41.26%
Nantou County Constituency 1	Wu Den-yih	67.12%
Nantou County Constituency 2	Lin Ming-chen	57.93%
Yunlin County Constituency 1	Chiang Chia-chun	56.24%
Yunlin County Constituency 2	Chang Sho-wen	49.11%
Chiayi County Constituency 1	Wong Chung-chun	57.47%
Chiayi County Constituency 2	Helen Chang	57.05%
Chiayi City	Chiang Yi-hsiung	46.70%
Tainan County Constituency 1	Yeh Yi-jin	54.57%
Tainan County Constituency 2	Huang Wei-cher	59.16%
Tainan County Constituency 3	Lee Chun-yee	52.66%
Tainan City Constituency 1	Chen Ting-fei	50.27%
Tainan City Constituency 2	William Lai	51.64%
Kaohsiung County Constituency 1	Chung Shao-ho	53.55%
Kaohsiung County Constituency 2	Lin Yi-shih	55.27%
Kaohsiung County Constituency 3	Chen Chi-yu	45.13%
Kaohsiung County Constituency 4	Chiang Ling-chun	50.22%
Pingtung County Constituency 1	Su Chen-ching	46.90%
Pingtung County Constituency 2	Wang Chin-shih	56.82%
Pingtung County Constituency 3	Pan Men-an	51.30%
Hualien County	Fu Kun-chi	66.39%
Taitung County	Justin Huang	61.09%
Penghu County	Lin Pin-kuan	50.71%
Kinmen County	Chen Fu-hai	37.31%
Lienchiang County	Tsao Erh-chung	49.72%
Lowland Aborigine	Liao Kuo-tung (Kuomintang); Yang Jen-fu (Kuomintang); Lin Cheng-er (林正二) ( People First Party)	
Highland Aborigine	Chien Tung-ming (Kuomintang); Kung Wen-chi (孔文吉) (Kuomintang); Kao Chin Su-mei (Non-Partisan Solidarity Union )	

- Notes:
1. Candidates marked are People First Party candidates running under the KMT party banner.
2. Candidates marked are New Party candidates who joined the Kuomintang with New Party endorsement.
3. Most names on the list follow the Tongyong Pinyin romanization used in the Central Election Committee website and may not accurately reflect the candidates' preferred romanization of their name.

=== Legislators elected through proportional representation and overseas Chinese ballots ===
No.	Party	Elected/Candidates	Candidate List
1	Civil Party	0/4	1. Lei Chiao-yun; 2. Chien Han-ching; 3. Chen Hua Zu; 4. Kong Jen-yi
2	Taiwan Constitution Association	0/3	1. Wu Ying-hsiang; 2. Huang Sin Jhu; 3. Huang Chien-ming
3	Taiwan Solidarity Union	0/15	1. Chen Yung-hsing; 2. Chen Yu-feng; 3. Lai Shin-yuan; 4. Shih Chao-hsien; 5. Chien Lin Hui-chun; 6. Chiang Wei-chun; 7. Huang Kun-huei; 8. Lo Chih-ming; 9. Lee Yi-chieh; 10. Fan Sheng-bao; 11. Chang Chin-sheng; 12. Fu Hsin-yi; 13. Huang Chao-chan; 14. Yeh Chin-ling; 15. Annie Lee
4	Third Society Party	0/5	1. Lu Hsiu-chu; 2. Yang Wei-chung; 3. Lin Chih-chen; 4. Yang Ching-hua; 5. Lin Chih-cheng
5	Democratic Progressive Party	14/33	1. Chen Chieh-ju; 2. Tsai Huang-liang; 3. Twu Shiing-jer; 4. Chiu Yi-ying; 5. Ker Chien-ming; 6. Huang Sue-ying; 7. Wang Sing-nan; 8. Hsueh Ling; 9. Gao Jyh-peng; 10. Chen Ying; 11. Yu Jane-daw; 12. Wong Chin-chu; 13. Chai Trong-rong; 14. Tien Chiu-chin; 15. Hung Chi-chang; 16. Chang Fu-mei; 17. Michael You; 18. Hsu Jung-shu; 19. Yu Shyi-kun; 20. Yang Fang-wan; 21. Chou Ching-yu; 22. Chen Mao-nan; 23. Wu Ming-ming; 24. Chang Shiow-jen; 25. Fan Sun-lu; 26. Wang To-far; 27. Chang Ching-hui; 28. Chou Kuang-chou; 29. Liu Mei-te; 30. Shih Yi-fang; 31. Li Yi Jing You Ma; 32. Liang Chen-hsiang; 33. Chen Hui-ling
6	New Party	0/10	1. Chou Yang-shan; 2. Joanna Lei; 3. Kao Chia-chun; 4. Lin Mei-lun; 5. Hsu Tsung-mao; 6. Kuo Chia-fen; 7. Ke Chien-pu; 8. Sun Chi-chen; 9. Lee Sheng-feng; 10. Yok Mu-ming
7	Green Party Taiwan	0/4	1. Mary Chen; 2. Chang Hui-shan; 3. Chang Hung-lin; 4. Wang Fang-ping
8	Taiwan Farmers' Party	0/8	1. Chien Hsiao-feng; 2. Ke Chun-hsiung; 3. Ma Kuo-ching; 4. Chen Hsin-hung; 5. Fan Chiang Hsiu-chen; 6. Chen Chung-kuang; 7. Hung Mei-chen; 8. Chang Wen-cheng
9	Non-Partisan Solidarity Union	0/2	1. Christina Liu; 2. Chen Chieh-ju
10	Kuomintang	20/34	1. Wang Jin-pyng; 2. Hung Hsiu-chu; 3. Tseng Yung-chuan; 4. Tina Pan; 5. Chiu Yi; 6. Cheng Chin-ling; 7. Chen Chieh; 8. Lee Jih-chu; 9. Chang Hsien-yao; 10. Nancy Chao; 11. Lee Chia-chin; 12. Liao Wan-ju; 13. Chi Kuo-tung; 14. Lo Shu-lei; 15. Mark Li; 16. Kuo Su-chun; 17. Liu Shen-liang; 18. Cheng Li-wen; 19. Shuai Hua-min; 20. Hsu Shao-ping; 21. Hsu Shu-po; 22. Chen Shu-hui; 23. Lee Chuan-chiao; 24. Hsu Yu-chen; 25. Huang Liang-hua; 26. Yang Yu-chen; 27. Lin Cheng-feng; 28. Hua Chen; 29. Yao Chiang-lin; 30. Chiu Mei-jui; 31. Chiang Chi-wun; 32. Lu Chun-lin; 33. Chiu Jun-jung; 34. Hsieh Kun-hung
11	Home Party	0/7	1. Yang Yu-hsin; 2. Yao Li-ming; 3. Chen Yao-chang; 4. Hu Te-fu; 5. Huang Hui-chun; 6. Tsung Ying-yi; 7. Wei Yao-chien
12	Hakka Party	0/3	1. Sung Chu-yu; 2. Chung Deng-ting; 3. Peng Yun-huang

- Notes:
1. Candidates marked with a ^ are overseas Chinese candidates.
2. Elected candidates are marked with a next to their name.
3. Candidates with are People First Party candidates running on a joint ticket with the Kuomintang。
4. Green Party Taiwan candidate Wang Fang Ping is endorsed by the coalition Raging Citizens Act Now!。
5. Most names on the list follow the Tongyong Pinyin romanization used in the Central Election Committee website and may not accurately reflect the candidates' preferred romanization of their name.

=== Legislators elected through subsequent by-elections ===
Date	Constituency	Outgoing member	Incoming member
14 March 2009	Miaoli 1	Lee Yi-ting	Kang Shih-ju
28 March 2009	Taipei City 6	Diane Lee	Chiang Nai-shin
26 September 2009	Yunlin 2	Chang Sho-wen	Liu Chien-kuo
5 December 2009	Nantou 1	Wu Den-yih	Ma Wen-chun
9 January 2010	Taichung County 3	Chiang Lien-fu (江連福)	Tony Jian
9 January 2010	Taitung	Justin Huang	Lie Kuen-cheng (賴坤成)
9 January 2010	Taoyuan 2	Liao Cheng-ching (廖正井)	Kuo June-tsung (郭榮宗)
27 February 2010	Chiayi County 2	Helen Chang	Chen Ming-wen
27 February 2010	Taoyuan 3	John Wu	Huang Jen-shu (黃仁杼)
27 February 2010	Hsinchu County	Chiu Ching-chun	Perng Shaw-jiin
27 February 2010	Hualien	Fu Kun-chi	王廷升
5 March 2011	Kaohsiung 4 (Kaohsiung County 3 in 2008)	Chen Chi-yu	Lin Tai-hua (林岱樺)
5 March 2011	Tainan 4 (Tainan City 2 in 2008)	William Lai	Hsu Tain-tsair

== Impact ==
With this election the KMT and the Pan-Blue Coalition have more than the two-thirds majority needed to propose a recall election of the President and if NPSU votes are counted with the pan-Blue coalition, more than the three-quarters majority needed to propose constitutional amendments.

== Reaction from People's Republic of China ==
The government of People's Republic of China, which claims sovereignty over Taiwan, remained largely silent on the election result. State media carried brief updates of results and passed no comment on either the referendum or the Kuomintang victory.

The government of China appointed 13 representatives for Taiwan to its own National People's Congress on the same day. These delegates are mostly descendants of Taiwanese who emigrated to the Mainland, or Communist supporters who fled Taiwan. Their positions are ceremonial as the PRC do not exercise effective jurisdiction over Taiwan.

== See also ==
- Seventh Legislative Yuan
