= Chen Chieh-ju =

Chen Chieh-ju may refer to:

- Chen Chieh-ju (born 1937), Taiwanese politician, served on the Legislative Yuan from 1993 to 2002, member of the Kuomintang and later the Non-Partisan Solidarity Union
- Chen Chieh-ju (born 1944), Taiwanese politician, served on the Legislative Yuan from 2008 to 2016, member of the Democratic Progressive Party
- Chen Jieru (1906–1971), second wife of Chiang Kai-shek
