= Tu Wen-ching =

Taiwanese politician

- 杜文卿

Member of the Legislative Yuan
- In office 1 February 1999 – 31 January 2008
- Succeeded by: Lee Yi-ting
- Constituency: Miaoli County

Personal details
- Born: 30 October 1954 (age 71) Yuanli, Miaoli County, Taiwan
- Party: Democratic Progressive Party

Tu Wen-ching (Chinese: 杜文卿; pinyin: Dù Wénqīng; born 30 October 1954) is a Taiwanese politician.

== Political career ==
Tu is a member of the Democratic Progressive Party, and has served on the party's Central Review Committee and Central Evaluation Committee.

He was elected to the Legislative Yuan for the first time in 1998, and reelected twice in 2001 and 2004. In 2002, he and other DPP legislators accused Vincent Siew of fraud. In 2005, Tu called for the resignation of Economics Minister Ho Mei-yueh, whom he accused of not working enough to solve the flooding that had plagued Miaoli County. The next year, Tu gained media attention for berating a customs official who confiscated twenty cartons of cigarettes from him after Tu had returned from an overseas trip. Later that year, he was involved in a verbal altercation during Double Ten Day celebrations. In 2007, the Kuomintang accused Tu of improperly profiting off land he had rented from the Taiwan Railways Administration to use as his campaign office. In 2008, the KMT called for an investigation targeting Tu and eleven other politicians, including Liu Shen-liang, Wang Tuoh, and Lo Fu-chu for accepting donations from Wang You-theng. Tu was listed as a controversial candidate by the Taiwan Competitiveness Forum prior to his 2008 campaign, and lost his seat in the legislature in that election cycle to Lee Yi-ting. He was elected the director of the Democratic Progressive Party's Miaoli County branch in May 2008. He put his name forward for the 14 March 2009 by-election called after the annulment of Lee Yi-ting's electoral victory, and lost to Kang Shih-ju. Tu ran as an independent in the local elections of 2009, and became the mayor of Yuanli, Miaoli. During his mayoralty, the township discussed the construction of wind turbines in the area, and dealt with an instance of graffiti. He made another legislative run for Miaoli County Constituency 1 in 2016, and lost to Chen Chao-ming.
