= Adimmune Corporation =

Taiwanese pharmaceutical company

- Native name: 國光生物科技股份有限公司
- Type: Public
- Traded as: TWSE: 004142
- Industry: Pharmaceuticals
- Founded: 1965; 61 years ago
- Headquarters: Tanzi District, Taichung, Taiwan
- Products: vaccines
- Website: www.adimmune.com.tw

Adimmune Corporation (Chinese: 國光生物科技股份有限公司; TWSE: 004142) is a Taiwanese pharmaceutical company engaged in the research, development, manufacturing, and sales of medicines and vaccines for both humans and animals. Its products are supplied to both local and international markets.

Founded in 1965 and headquartered in Tanzi District, Taichung, it has a market cap of US$230 million, 564 employees and annual sales of $106 million as of 2026.

Adimmune continues to seek expansion its role in the regional pharmaceutical and vaccine industry through international collaborations.

In January 2021, Adimmune Corporation announced a partnership with Sam Chun Dang Pharm to jointly develop an injectable medication used to treat macular disease.

In July 2021, the company announced that its first overseas manufacturing site will be situated in the Special Economic Zone in East Java, Indonesia, aiming to launch clinical trials for its COVID-19 vaccine in Indonesia early 2022.

In August 2021, Adimmune Corporation signed a memorandum of understanding with Becton, Dickinson and Company to strengthen its international pharmaceutical collaboration.
