= Sue Huang =

Sue Huang may refer to:

- Huang Sue-ying, Taiwanese activist and politician
- Sue Huang (scientist), New Zealand virologist
