= Miaoli County Constituency 1 =

Constituency of the Legislative Yuan of Taiwan

- Single-member constituency for the Legislative Yuan
- District(s): Houlong, Sanyi, Tongluo, Tongxiao, Yuanli, Zaoqiao, Zhunan
- Electorate: 205,858 (2024 election)

Current constituency
- Created: 2008
- Party: IND
- Member: Chen Chao-ming

Miaoli County Constituency 1 (Chinese: 苗栗縣第一選舉區; pinyin: Miáolì Xiàn Dì-yī Xuǎnjǔ Qū) is one of the 73 regional constituencies represented in the Legislative Yuan, the national legislature of Taiwan. It was created in 2008 following a series of constitutional reforms, and elects one legislator, through first-past-the-post voting, to the Legislative Yuan. It has been represented by Chen Chao-ming as an Independent since 2021, who stood as a Kuomintang legislator between 2012 and 2021.

== Legislators ==
Election	Legislator	Party
2008	Lee Yi-ting	Kuomintang
2009 - 2012	Kang Shih-ju	Independent
2012	Vacant (Note: Incumbent resigned to run for Zhunan Mayor on 19 January 2012, and as the seat was vacated less than a year before the next scheduled election, no by-election took place)	
2012 - 2021	Chen Chao-ming	Kuomintang
2021	Chen Chao-ming	Independent

== Election results ==

=== 2008 ===
2008 Taiwanese legislative election: Miaoli 1
Candidate	Party	Votes	%
Lee Yi-ting	Kuomintang	64,817	58.02
Tu Wen-ching	Democratic Progressive Party	46,905	41.98
Total		111,722	100.00
Valid votes		111,722	97.63
Invalid/blank votes		2,712	2.37
Total votes		114,434	100.00
Registered voters/turnout		195,381	58.57
Majority		17,912	16.04
Kuomintang win (new seat)			

=== 2009 by-election ===
Called due to the 2008 election being annulled by the High Court due to incumbent legislator Lee Yi-ting being accused of vote-buying. Lee's wife, Chen Yuan-ling, ran in the election.

2009 Legislative Yuan by-election: Miaoli 1
Candidate	Party	Votes	%	+/–
Kang Shih-ju	Independent (Note: Gave up his Kuomintang membership to run)	41,696	50.98	NEW
Chen Yuan-ling	Kuomintang	40,096	49.02	▼9.00
Total		81,792	100.00	–
Valid votes		81,792	98.63	
Invalid/blank votes		1,140	1.37	
Total votes		82,932	100.00	
Registered voters/turnout		196,932	42.11	
Majority		1,600	1.96	
Independent gain from Kuomintang				

=== 2012 ===
2012 Taiwanese legislative election: Miaoli 1
Candidate	Party	Votes	%	+/–
Chen Chao-ming	Kuomintang	82,902	56.82	▲7.80
Tu Wen-ching	Democratic Progressive Party	56,179	38.50	NEW
Huang Yu-yen	Independent	4,730	3.24	NEW
Li Chao-hsiung	Taiwanism Party	2,095	1.44	NEW
Total		145,906	100.00	–
Valid votes		145,906	96.98	
Invalid/blank votes		4,542	3.02	
Total votes		150,448	100.00	
Registered voters/turnout		202,011	74.48	
Majority		26,723	18.32	
Kuomintang gain from Independent				

=== 2016 ===
* denotes the incumbent legislator

2016 Taiwanese legislative election: Miaoli 1
Candidate	Party	Votes	%	+/–
Chen Chao-ming*	Kuomintang	56,373	42.26	▼14.56
Tu Wen-ching	Democratic Progressive Party	47,837	35.86	▼2.64
Kang Shih-ju	Minkuotang	23,134	17.34	NEW
Huang Yu-yen	Independent	3,074	2.30	▼0.94
Lin I-fang	Free Taiwan Party	2,976	2.23	NEW
Total		133,394	100.00	–
Valid votes		133,394	97.93	
Invalid/blank votes		2,821	2.07	
Total votes		136,215	100.00	
Registered voters/turnout		207,220	65.73	
Majority		8,536	6.4	
Kuomintang hold				

=== 2020 ===
* denotes the incumbent legislator

2020 Taiwanese legislative election: Miaoli 1
Candidate	Party	Votes	%	+/–
Chen Chao-ming*	Kuomintang	73,154	49.07	▲6.81
Lo Kuei-hsing	Democratic Progressive Party	56,622	37.98	▲2.12
Chu Che-cheng	Taiwan People's Party	16,566	11.11	NEW
Tseng Kuo-liang	Independent	1,050	0.70	NEW
Chu Ying-hao	Independent	1,046	0.70	NEW
Chung Lin-chih-lun	Sovereign State for Formosa & Pescadores Party	632	0.42	NEW
Total		149,070	100.00	–
Valid votes		149,070	98.11	
Invalid/blank votes		2,864	1.89	
Total votes		151,934	100.00	
Registered voters/turnout		206,005	73.75	
Majority		16,532	11.09	
Kuomintang hold				

=== 2024 ===
* denotes the incumbent legislator

2024 Taiwanese legislative election: Miaoli 1
Candidate	Party	Votes	%	+/–
Chen Chao-ming*	Independent (Note: Suspended by the Kuomintang)	79,521	56.85	▲7.78
Kang Shih-ming	Democratic Progressive Party	60,358	43.15	▲5.17
Total		139,879	100.00	–
Valid votes		139,879	94.87	
Invalid/blank votes		7,569	5.13	
Total votes		147,448	100.00	
Registered voters/turnout		205,858	71.63	
Majority		19,163	13.7	
Independent gain from Kuomintang				
