= Yunlin County Constituency 2 =

Constituency of the Legislative Yuan of Taiwan

- Single-member constituency for the Legislative Yuan
- District(s): Lunbei, Erlun, Xiluo, Cihtong, Linnei, Dapi, Dounan, Gukeng, Douliu City
- Electorate: 281,988 (2024 election)

Current constituency
- Created: 2008
- Party: DPP
- Member: Liu Chien-kuo

Yunlin County Constituency 1 (Chinese: 雲林縣第二選舉區; pinyin: Yúnlín Xiàn Dì-èr Xuǎnjǔ Qū) is one of the 73 regional constituencies represented in the Legislative Yuan, the national legislature of Taiwan. It was created in 2008 following a series of constitutional reforms, and elects one legislator, through first-past-the-post voting, to the Legislative Yuan. It has been represented by Liu Chien-kuo of the Democratic Progressive Party since 2009.

== Legislators ==
Election	Legislator	Party
2008 - 2009	Chang Sho-wen	Kuomintang
2009	Liu Chien-kuo	Democratic Progressive Party

== Election results ==

=== 2008 ===
2008 Taiwanese legislative election: Yunlin County 2
Candidate	Party	Votes	%
Chang Sho-wen	Kuomintang	79,138	49.11
Liu Chien-kuo	Democratic Progressive Party	61,703	38.29
Yin Ling-ying	Independent	17,282	10.73
Liao Kuei-ju	Third Society Party	2,055	1.28
Huang Kuo-hua	Taiwan Constitution Association	499	0.31
Chang Kun-huang	Great Compassionate Salvation Party	454	0.28
Total		161,131	100.00
Valid votes		161,131	98.07
Invalid/blank votes		3,178	1.93
Total votes		164,309	100.00
Registered voters/turnout		277,668	59.17
Majority		17,435	10.82
Kuomintang win (new seat)			

=== 2009 by-election ===
Called due to the 2008 election being annulled by the High Court due to incumbent legislator Chang Sho-wen being accused of vote-buying.

2009 Legislative Yuan by-election: Yunlin County 2
Candidate	Party	Votes	%	+/–
Liu Chien-kuo	Democratic Progressive Party	74,272	58.81	▲20.52
Chang Ken-hui	Kuomintang	29,278	23.18	▼25.93
Chang Hui-yuan	Independent	22,747	18.01	NEW
Total		126,297	100.00	–
Valid votes		126,297	99.07	
Invalid/blank votes		1,186	0.93	
Total votes		127,483	100.00	
Registered voters/turnout		279,854	45.55	
Majority		44,994	35.63	
Democratic Progressive Party gain from Kuomintang				

=== 2012 ===
* denotes the incumbent legislator

2012 Taiwanese legislative election: Yunlin County 2
Candidate	Party	Votes	%	+/–
Liu Chien-kuo*	Democratic Progressive Party	121,368	60.98	▲2.17
Hsu Shu-po	Kuomintang	73,832	37.10	▲13.92
Wang Mei-hsin	The People Union Party	3,817	1.92	NEW
Total		199,017	100.00	–
Valid votes		199,017	98.38	
Invalid/blank votes		3,281	1.62	
Total votes		202,298	100.00	
Registered voters/turnout		281,295	71.92	
Majority		47,536	23.88	
Democratic Progressive Party hold				

=== 2016 ===
* denotes the incumbent legislator

2016 Taiwanese legislative election: Yunlin County 2
Candidate	Party	Votes	%	+/–
Liu Chien-kuo*	Democratic Progressive Party	121,114	68.17	▲7.19
Wu Wei-chih	Kuomintang	46,494	26.17	▼10.93
Wang Wei-ting	New Power Party	7,241	4.08	NEW
Chang Chia-wei	Trees Party	2,814	1.58	NEW
Total		177,663	100.00	–
Valid votes		177,663	98.17	
Invalid/blank votes		3,309	1.83	
Total votes		180,972	100.00	
Registered voters/turnout		283,296	63.88	
Majority		74,620	42	
Democratic Progressive Party hold				

=== 2020 ===
* denotes the incumbent legislator

2020 Taiwanese legislative election: Yunlin County 2
Candidate	Party	Votes	%	+/–
Liu Chien-kuo*	Democratic Progressive Party	119,468	57.30	▼10.87
Hsieh Shu-ya	Kuomintang	82,150	39.40	▲13.23
Peng Hsin-ming	Independent	6,070	2.91	NEW
Chang Yung-chin	Formosa Alliance	805	0.39	NEW
Total		208,493	100.00	–
Valid votes		208,493	98.67	
Invalid/blank votes		2,814	1.33	
Total votes		211,307	100.00	
Registered voters/turnout		283,554	74.52	
Majority		37,318	17.9	
Democratic Progressive Party hold				

=== 2024 ===
* denotes the incumbent legislator

2024 Taiwanese legislative election: Yunlin County 2
Candidate	Party	Votes	%	+/–
Liu Chien-kuo*	Democratic Progressive Party	115,376	59.48	▲2.18
Chiu Liang-yueh	Kuomintang	78,596	40.52	▲1.12
Total		193,972	100.00	–
Valid votes		193,972	97.00	
Invalid/blank votes		5,996	3.00	
Total votes		199,968	100.00	
Registered voters/turnout		281,988	70.91	
Majority		36,780	18.96	
Democratic Progressive Party hold				
