= International reactions to the Fukushima nuclear accident =

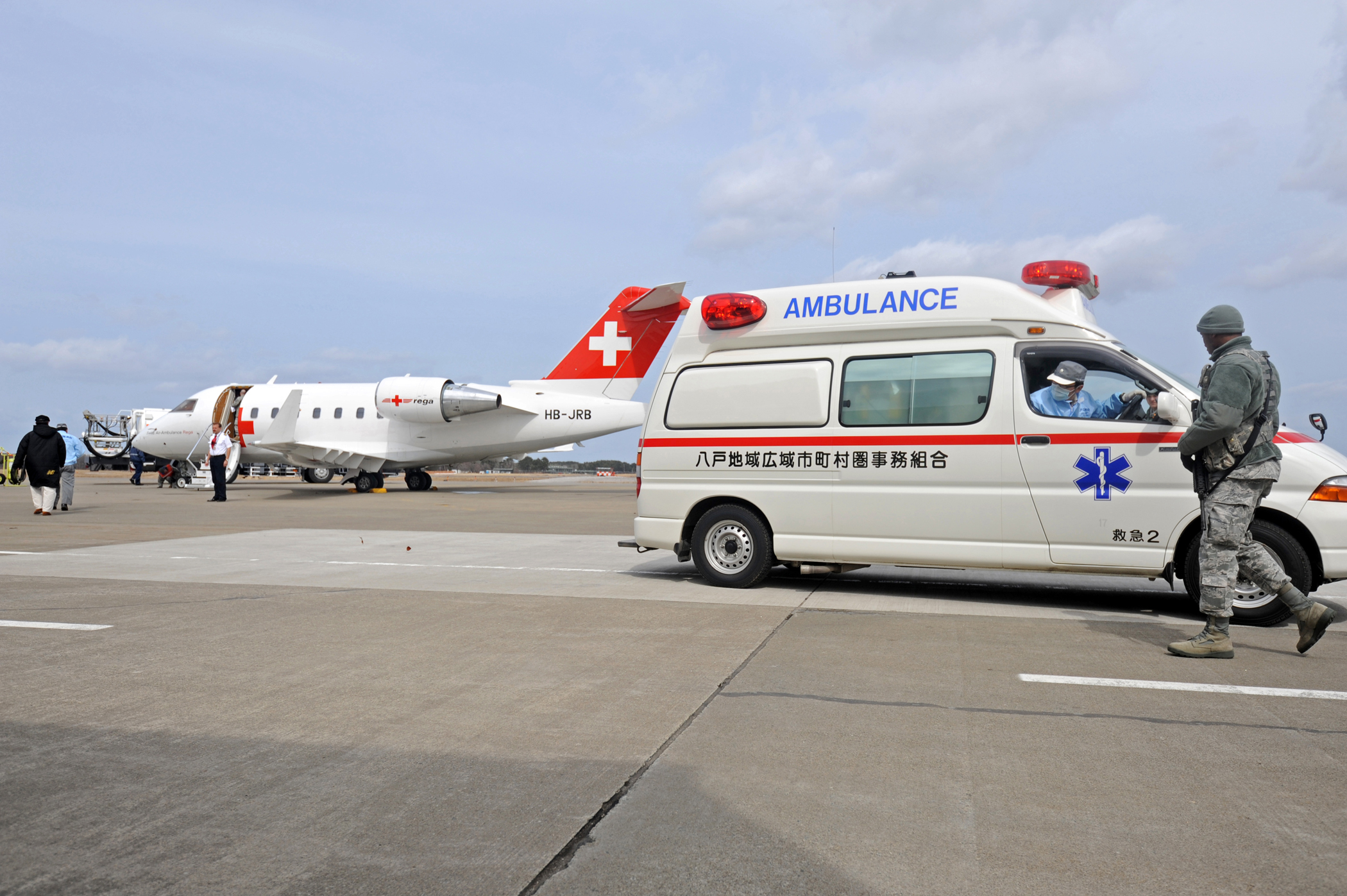
Evacuation flight departs Misawa.

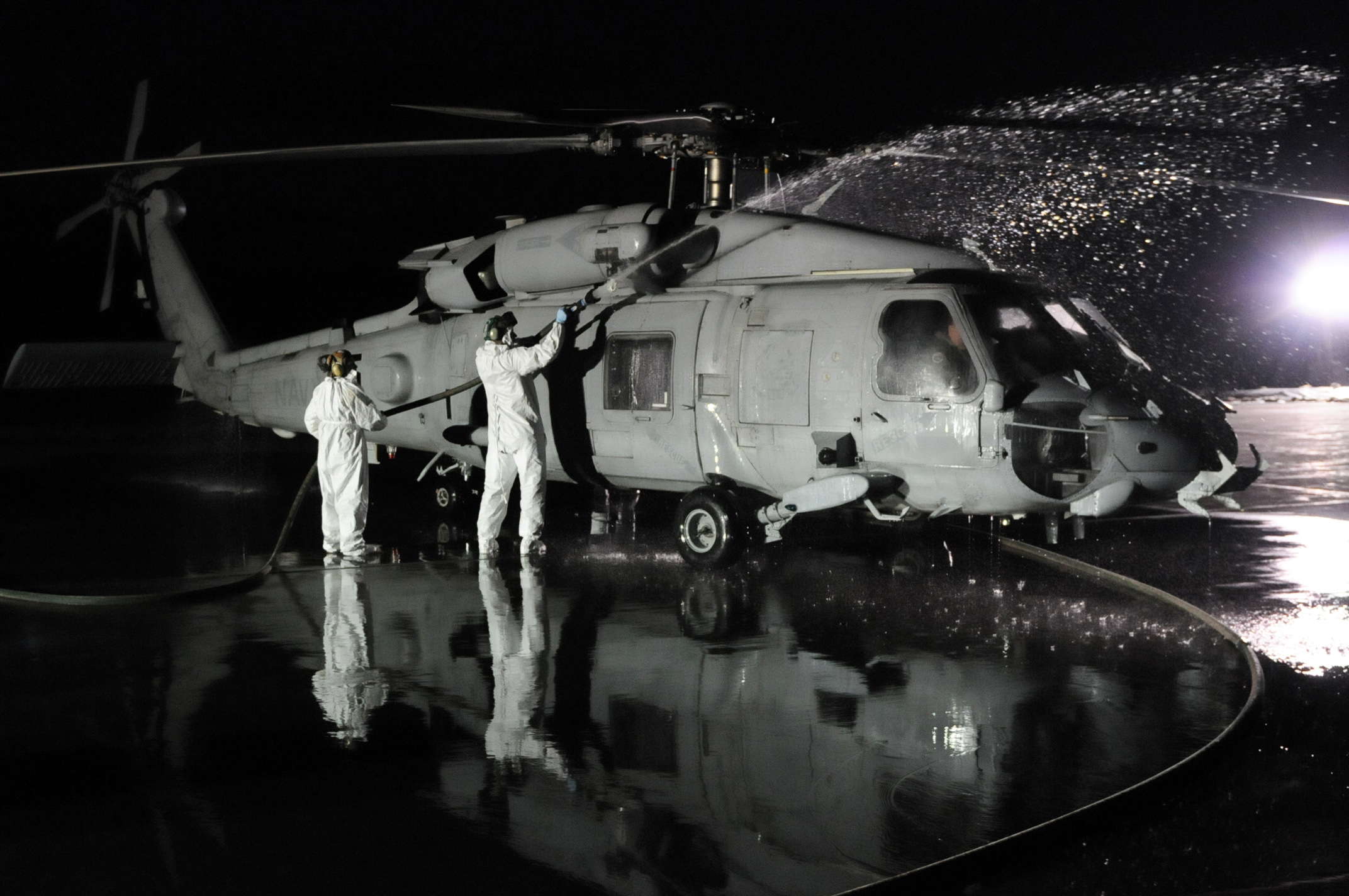
U.S. Navy humanitarian flight undergoes radioactive decontamination

The international reaction to the 2011 Fukushima Daiichi nuclear disaster has been diverse and widespread. Many inter-governmental agencies responded to the Japanese Fukushima Daiichi nuclear disaster, often on an ad hoc basis. Responders included International Atomic Energy Agency, World Meteorological Organization and the Preparatory Commission for the Comprehensive Nuclear Test Ban Treaty Organization, which has radiation detection equipment deployed around the world.

In September 2011, IAEA Director General Yukiya Amano said the Japanese nuclear disaster "caused deep public anxiety throughout the world and damaged confidence in nuclear power". Many countries have advised their nationals to leave Tokyo, citing the risk associated with the nuclear plants' ongoing accident. Nonetheless, estimates of radioactivity leakage into the Pacific Ocean remain modest with National Geographic reporting the leakage of approximately 0.3 Tbq per month of both ^{137}Cs and ^{134}Cs. 0.3 TBq is equal to ^{1}/_{40}^{th} of the natural radiation in one km^{3} of seawater and ^{1}/_{50000000000}^{th} of the total natural radioactivity in the oceans. Following the Fukushima I accidents, The Economist reported that the International Energy Agency halved its estimate of additional nuclear generating capacity to be built by 2035.

Germany accelerated plans to close all of its old nuclear power reactors and to phase the rest out entirely by 2022. The policy is controversial leading to electricity twice the price of that in neighbouring France. Der Spiegel reported that German Economy and Energy Minister Sigmar Gabriel admitted that "exiting nuclear and coal-fired power generation at the same time would not be possible". In Italy there was a national referendum, in which 94 percent voted against the governments plan to build new nuclear power plants.

Elsewhere in the world, nuclear power continues to be discussed in Malaysia, and plans are well-advanced in the United Arab Emirates, Jordan, and Bangladesh. China briefly paused its nuclear development program, but has since restarted it. China plans to triple its nuclear capacity to at least 58 GWe by 2020, then some 150 GWe by 2030, and much more by 2050.

== Nuclear industry ==
According to Areva's Southeast Asia and Oceania director, Selena Ng, Japan's Fukushima nuclear disaster is "a huge wake-up call for a nuclear industry that hasn't always been sufficiently transparent about safety issues". She said "There was a sort of complacency before Fukushima and I don't think we can afford to have that complacency now".

In September 2011, German engineering giant Siemens announced it will withdraw entirely from the nuclear industry, as a response to the Fukushima nuclear disaster in Japan, and said that it would no longer build nuclear power plants anywhere in the world. The company's chairman, Peter Löscher, said that "Siemens was ending plans to cooperate with Rosatom, the Russian state-controlled nuclear power company, in the construction of dozens of nuclear plants throughout Russia over the coming two decades". Siemens is to boost its work in the renewable energy sector.

== Regulatory agencies ==
Many inter-governmental agencies are responding, often on an ad hoc basis. Responders include International Atomic Energy Agency, World Meteorological Organization and the Preparatory Commission for the Comprehensive Nuclear Test Ban Treaty Organization, which has radiation detection equipment deployed around the world.

Some scientists say that the 2011 Japanese nuclear accidents have revealed that the nuclear industry lacks sufficient oversight, leading to renewed calls to redefine the mandate of the IAEA so that it can better police nuclear power plants worldwide. There are several problems with the IAEA says Najmedin Meshkati of University of Southern California:

It recommends safety standards, but member states are not required to comply; it promotes nuclear energy, but it also monitors nuclear use; it is the sole global organization overseeing the nuclear energy industry, yet it is also weighed down by checking compliance with the Nuclear Non-Proliferation Treaty (NPT).

The journal Nature has reported that the IAEA response to the Fukushima nuclear crisis in Japan was "sluggish and sometimes confusing", drawing calls for the agency to "take a more proactive role in nuclear safety". But nuclear experts say that the agency's complicated mandate and the constraints imposed by its member states mean that reforms will not happen quickly or easily, although its INES "emergency scale is very likely to be revisited" given the confusing way in which it was used in Japan.

Russian nuclear opponent Iouli Andreev was critical of the response to Fukushima, and says that the IAEA did not learn from the 1986 Chernobyl disaster. He has accused the IAEA and corporations of "wilfully ignoring lessons from the world's worst nuclear accident 25 years ago to protect the industry's expansion". The IAEA's role "as an advocate for nuclear power has made it a target for protests".

One of the IAEA statutory functions is to establish safety standards to protect the health, life and property in the use of nuclear power. When reports of the damaged nuclear power plants at Fukushima emerged, many countries looked immediately to the IAEA for more information. But its initial reports provided scant and at times contradictory information from Japanese sources and it took a week for the IAEA to dispatch a team to Japan to gather more facts on the ground. While the IAEA has stated that it was hampered by lack of official information from Japan, this "has nonetheless prompted analysts to question the efficacy of the Agency". Olli Heinonen has said that "Fukushima should be a wake-up call to re-evaluate and strengthen the role of the IAEA in boosting nuclear safety, including its response mechanism".

On 28 March 2011, at a special briefing on the Fukushima nuclear accidents held for IAEA Member States, IAEA Director General Yukiya Amano announced that a high-level IAEA Conference on Nuclear Safety should take place in Vienna.

According to the International Atomic Energy Agency, Japan "underestimated the danger of tsunamis and failed to prepare adequate backup systems at the Fukushima Daiichi nuclear plant". This repeated a widely held criticism in Japan that "collusive ties between regulators and industry led to weak oversight and a failure to ensure adequate safety levels at the plant". The IAEA also said that the Fukushima disaster exposed the lack of adequate backup systems at the plant. Once power was completely lost, critical functions like the cooling system shut down. Three of the reactors "quickly overheated, causing meltdowns that eventually led to explosions, which hurled large amounts of radioactive material into the air".

On 30 March, Denis Flory, IAEA deputy director general and head of the agency's nuclear safety and security department, said readings from soil samples collected in Iitate indicate that one of the IAEA operational criteria for evacuation is exceeded there. On 31 March, In response to the IAEA, Japan's Chief Cabinet Secretary Yukio Edano said Thursday the government may implement measures, if necessary, such as urging people living in the area to evacuate, if it is found that the contaminated soil will have a long-term effect on human health. Hidehiko Nishiyama, a spokesman for the Nuclear and Industrial Safety Agency, told a press conference in the afternoon that the agency's rough estimates have shown there is no need for people in Iitate to evacuate immediately under criteria set by the Nuclear Safety Commission of Japan. The Japanese government declined recommendation of IAEA.

In April 2011, representatives from dozens of countries met in Austria to scrutinize safety at each other's power plants with the aim of avoiding accidents such as the Japanese nuclear crisis. The meeting was hosted by the International Atomic Energy Agency and focused on the Convention on Nuclear Safety that came into being in the wake of the Three Mile Island accident and Chernobyl disaster.

On 12 April 2011, the IAEA reported that the nuclear accident at Fukushima I is now rated as a Level 7 "major accident" on the INES scale. Level 7 is the most serious level on INES and is used to describe an event consisting of "a major release of radioactive material with widespread health and environmental effects requiring implementation of planned and extended countermeasures." Over the previous month, some scientists in the United States and the head of France's Nuclear Safety Authority argued that the accident was, at that time, already worse than the 1979 Three Mile Island accident in Pennsylvania, which was rated a 5.

Following the Fukushima I accidents, the International Energy Agency halved its estimate of additional nuclear generating capacity to be built by 2035.

In September 2011, IAEA Director General Yukiya Amano said the Japanese nuclear disaster "caused deep public anxiety throughout the world and damaged confidence in nuclear power".

== Non-government organizations ==
Linda Gunter of Beyond Nuclear spoke to the World Socialist Web Site on 19 March 2011. Gunter stated that the disaster could not be called an accident because it was the outcome of a "gamble [that] has been going on since the dawn of the nuclear age". She also voiced concern over Fukushima-style reactors operating in the United States. Beyond Nuclear began a campaign to shut these reactors down on 13 April 2011.

The World Future Council issued a "Statement on the Japanese Nuclear Disaster" on 29 March 2011, supported by many Right Livelihood Award Laureates. It said that the disaster in Japan has demonstrated the limits of human capability to keep dangerous technologies free from accidents with catastrophic results:

The conclusion we draw from the nuclear power plant accident in Japan is that the human community, acting for itself and as trustees for future generations, must exercise a far higher level of care globally in dealing with technologies capable of causing mass annihilation, and should phase out, abolish and replace such technologies with alternatives that do not threaten present and future generations. This applies to nuclear weapons as well as to nuclear power reactors.

Citing the Fukushima Daiichi nuclear disaster, environmental activists at a U.N. meeting in April 2011 "urged bolder steps to tap renewable energy so the world doesn't have to choose between the dangers of nuclear power and the ravages of climate change".

Some shipping lines restricted their ships from calling on the Tokyo Bay ports of Tokyo and Yokohama over radiation concerns. Vessels risk facing extra delays for checks at subsequent destinations if they pick up even trace contamination.

=== Greenpeace ===
Greenpeace sent radiology experts to the villages of Iitate and Tsushima in the Fukushima Prefecture. They found levels up to 100 μSv/h in the village of Iitate, and based on that, recommended that the government widen the 20 km no-go zone, which Iitate lies outside of, to at least 30 km. An official of the NSA said that high radioactivity levels detected by the NGO could not be considered reliable, although some members of Greenpeace stressed that their numbers corresponded in other areas. The New York Times called the reporting by Greenpeace (with a well-known anti-nuclear position) a "guarded endorsement to the radiation data published by the Japanese government", due to the general correspondence between the numbers. Members of Greenpeace stressed that there has been distrust of the official data, and that their contention was not the radiation levels, but the action that was taken.

== Financial markets ==
As a result of the accidents, stock prices of many energy companies reliant on nuclear sources and listed on stock exchanges have dropped, while renewable energy companies have increased dramatically in value. In Germany, demand for renewable energy has increased among private consumers.

Funds that invested in companies tied to renewable energy, clean technology, the oil industry and other natural resources rose 13.7% in the first three months of 2011, "benefiting from turmoil in the oil-rich Middle East and the anti-nuclear sentiment after the accident in Japan".

== Actions and recommendations related to the Fukushima disaster ==
=== Evacuation from Tokyo and Japan ===
On 14 March, France became the first country to advise its nationals to leave Tokyo, citing a probable large aftershock in the Kanto area and the risk associated with the nuclear plants' ongoing accidents.

Embassies of other countries, including UK, Germany, Switzerland, Austria, Italy, Australia, New Zealand, Finland, Kenya, Israel repeated similar advice in the following days.

German, Austrian, Finnish and Bulgarian embassies were temporarily relocated in southern parts of Japan. Russian authorities were reported on 15 March to be ready to evacuate the Kuril Islands and Sakhalin, if needed. On 12 April, the Philippines government announced that they would pay for the repatriation of any Filipinos living in the evacuation zone.

On 16 March, Voice of America reported that the US Embassy in Tokyo had advised Americans to evacuate to at least 80 km from the plant, or to stay indoors. US officials have concluded that the Japanese warnings have been insufficient, and that, deliberately or not, they have understated the potential threat of what is taking place inside the nuclear facility, according to The New York Times. Gregory Jaczko, the chairman of the US Nuclear Regulatory Commission (NRC), earlier said he believed that all the water in the spent fuel pool at Unit 4 had boiled dry, leaving fuel rods stored there exposed. "We believe that radiation levels are extremely high, which could possibly impact the ability to take corrective measures," he told a Congressional committee. United States government officials moved to allay fears of nuclear fallout, stating that people do not need to take or stockpile potassium iodide pills, after a spike in calls from the West Coast to health hotlines, and runs at pharmacies with people buying the iodine tablets on the Pacific Coast.

=== Potassium Iodide ===
A number of embassies in Tokyo, including Australia, France, Sweden, Switzerland, United Kingdom and United States issued potassium iodide tablets as a precautionary measure to their citizens and immediate family members. On 20 March, Swedish citizens in Tokyo were recommended to begin taking potassium iodide as a precautionary measure. This recommendation was lifted on 29 March.

Due to a run on potassium iodide tablets in pharmacies in Western Canada, Canadian Prime Minister Stephen Harper, issued statements on 15 March of reassurance that Canada was not at risk from the fallout, and that taking the iodine tablets was unnecessary. British Columbia's health officer Dr. Perry Kendall, urged residents not to stockpile the tablets.

On 17 March, the United States newsmagazine Time reported on the Southern Californian residents reaction to the risk from the fallout, and the run on iodine tablets. On 18 March, France was reported to be shipping iodide tablets to French Polynesia as a preventative measure, in light of the fallout cloud drifting across the Pacific.

=== Requests and offers for help ===
The Japanese government and Tokyo Electric asked France's Areva to provide technical assistance in the process of removing radioactive water from the nuclear power facility.

On 16 March, South Korea was reported to be sending boron for the production of boric acid to dampen fission reactions.

A Ukrainian group of specialists who were involved in the aftermath of the Chernobyl nuclear disaster proposed liquid metal cooling with a low-melting and chemically neutral metal, such as tin, to cool the fuel rods even if they are molten or damaged. A team of Ukrainian nuclear specialists was reported on 17 March to be ready to fly out to realize this.

The United States launched Operation Tomodachi to assist the Japanese in their recovery.

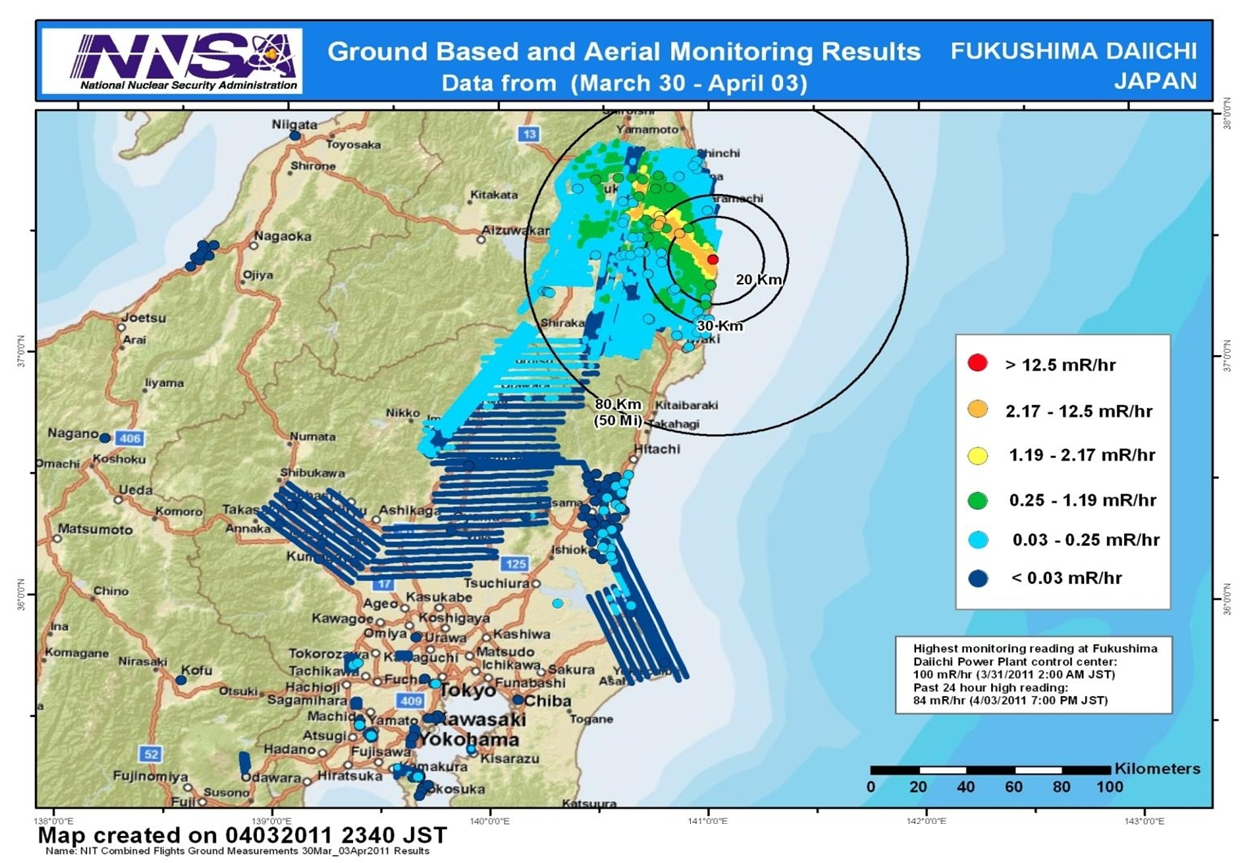
Readings from aerial survey conducted by United States federal agencies after the Fukushima accident

Three days after the earthquake, the U.S. Department of Energy in cooperation with the NNSA sent 33 people and 8.6 tons of equipment to Japan to assist efforts to monitor radiation, including consequence management response teams and a NNSA aerial system that took thousands of radiation readings over the next two weeks.

=== Cleanup ===
International experts have said that a workforce in the hundreds or even thousands would take years or decades to clean up the area. John Price, a former member of the Safety Policy Unit at the UK's National Nuclear Corporation, has said that it "might be 100 years before melting fuel rods can be safely removed from Japan's Fukushima nuclear plant". Edward Morse, a professor of nuclear engineering at the University of California, Berkeley, has said:

...there would be at least six months of emergency stabilisation, about two years of temporary remediation and up to 30 years of full-scale clean-up. Furthermore, the high levels of ground contamination at the site are raising concerns about the viability of individuals to work at the site in coming decades.

=== Other reactions ===
The Hong Kong Government issued a black outbound travel alert for Fukushima prefecture on 12 March urging to avoid all travel. The alert came in addition to the red outbound travel alert for the rest of Japan.

On 19 March 2011, Indonesia began screening passengers and luggage on direct flights from Japan for radiation. No radiation has been detected.

On 16 March, Swedish citizens were advised to avoid staying within 80 km of the Fukushima nuclear power plants, and all travel to Japan was advised against. On 29 March the travel advice eased to only apply to non-necessary travel.

The South Korea Atomic Energy Research Institute operates 59 radiation monitoring centers across the nation. After the Fukushima disaster begun, radiation monitoring activities increased across the country but radiation levels remained normal.

== Protests and politics by country ==
=== Taiwan ===
In March 2011, around 2,000 anti-nuclear protesters demonstrated in Taiwan for an immediate halt to the construction of the island's fourth nuclear power plant. The protesters were also opposed to plans to extend the lifespan of three existing nuclear plants.

Amid Japan's ongoing nuclear crisis, nuclear energy is emerging as a contentious issue for next year's presidential election in Taiwan, as opposition leader Tsai Ing-wen declared her intention to abandon nuclear power by 2025 if elected. Taiwan is on the West Pacific Rim earthquake zone, like Japan.

George Hsu, a professor of applied economics at National Chung Hsing University in central Taiwan, said nuclear power plants in quake-prone areas need to be redesigned to make them more resistant, an investment that would reduce their original cost advantage.

In May 2011, 5,000 people joined an anti-nuclear protest in Taipei City, which was characterized by a carnival-like atmosphere, with protesters holding yellow banners and clutching sunflowers. This was part of a nationwide "No Nuke Action" protest, urging the government to stop construction of a Fourth Nuclear Plant and pursue a more sustainable energy policy.

On the eve of World Environment Day in June 2011, environmental groups demonstrated against Taiwan's nuclear power policy. The Taiwan Environmental Protection Union, together with 13 environmental groups and legislators, gathered in Taipei with banners that read: "I love Taiwan, not nuclear disasters". They protested against the nation's three operating nuclear power plants and the construction of a fourth plant. They also called for "all nuclear power plants to be thoroughly re-evaluated and shut down immediately if they fail to pass safety inspections". According to Wang To-far, economics professor at National Taipei University, "if a level-seven nuclear crisis were to happen in Taiwan, it would destroy the nation".

=== United States ===
What had been growing acceptance of nuclear power in the United States was eroded sharply following the 2011 Japanese nuclear accidents, with public support for building nuclear power plants in the U.S. dropping slightly lower than it was immediately after the Three Mile Island accident in 1979, according to a CBS News poll. Only 43 percent of those polled after the Fukushima nuclear emergency said they would approve building new power plants in the United States.

Activists who were involved in the U.S. anti-nuclear movement's emergence (such as Graham Nash and Paul Gunter), suggest that Japan's nuclear crisis may rekindle an interest in the movement in the United States. The aim, they say, is "not just to block the Obama administration's push for new nuclear construction, but to convince Americans that existing plants pose dangers".

In March 2011, 600 people gathered for a weekend protest outside the Vermont Yankee nuclear plant. The demonstration was held to show support for the thousands of Japanese people who are endangered by possible radiation from the Fukushima I nuclear accidents.

The New England region has a long history of anti-nuclear activism and 75 people held a State House rally on 6 April 2011, to "protest the region's aging nuclear plants and the increasing stockpile of radioactive spent fuel rods at them". The protest was held shortly before a State House hearing where legislators were scheduled to hear representatives of the region's three nuclear plants – Pilgrim in Plymouth, Vermont Yankee in Vernon, and Seabrook in New Hampshire—talk about the safety of their reactors in the light of the Japanese nuclear crisis. Vermont Yankee and Pilgrim have designs similar to the crippled Japanese nuclear plant.

The nuclear disaster in Japan is likely to have major effects on US energy policy, according to billionaire investor Warren Buffett. Buffet said that the "United States was poised to move ahead with nuclear plans here, but the events in Japan derailed that".

In April 2011, Rochelle Becker, executive director of the Alliance for Nuclear Responsibility said that the United States should review its nuclear accident liability limits, in the light of the economic impacts of the Fukushima I nuclear disaster.

In December 2011, as Japan completed "step 2" of its control roadmap at Fukushima, U.S. NRC chairman Jaczko visited the plant and said afterwards "that there was no longer enough energy in the reactors at the crippled Fukushima No. 1 Nuclear Power Plant to produce an offsite release of radiation, but pointed out that a large cleanup task remained".

=== Other ===
France

In France around 1,000 people took part in a protest against nuclear power in Paris on 20 March, and some 3,800 French and Germans demonstrated for the closure of the Fessenheim Nuclear Power Plant on 8 April; a larger demonstration is expected on 25 April. Opinion polls on the topic indicated that 55% of the population were in favour of nuclear power in the days following Fukushima, but 57% against by the end of March.

Germany

In March 2011, more than 200,000 people took part in anti-nuclear protests in four large German cities, on the eve of state elections. Organisers called it the biggest anti-nuclear demonstration the country has seen, with police estimating that 100,000 people turned out in Berlin alone. Hamburg, Munich and Cologne also saw big demonstrations. The New York Times reported that "most Germans have a deep-seated aversion to nuclear power, and the damage at the Fukushima Daiichi plant in Japan has galvanized opposition".

After Japan's nuclear disaster, there was an all-time best state election result for the anti-nuclear Green Party in Germany in the Baden-Württemberg election on 27 March 2011. However, the Greens' rise in popularity, which began October 2010 in the polls, has also been attributed to the unanimous opposition to Stuttgart 21.

The CDU-led government under Chancellor Angela Merkel made an aboutface in their nuclear energy policy. In 2010 the Government had just prolonged the retention period of nuclear power plants which were scheduled to be phased out in 2021 by the nuclear phase-out plan of 2000. In light of the Fukushima disaster, the Government changed its mind:

A physicist by training and a former environment minister, Merkel understood what Fukushima meant. Germany has 17 reactors, providing 23 percent of the electrical power in the country and making it the sixth largest nuclear electricity producer in the world. The eight oldest reactors were taken off the grid within days of 3/11 and will not return to operation. In record time, what once was the most pro-nuclear German government in decades prepared comprehensive legislation to phase out the remaining nine reactors by 2022 at the latest, starting in 2015. In June, parliament overwhelmingly passed the law (513 in favor, 79 against, 8 abstentions).

India

In India, there has been rapid growth in energy use and there are plans to build the world's largest nuclear plant in Jaitapur, but anti-nuclear protests have intensified following the Fukushima crisis. On 18 April one man was shot and killed by police and eight were injured after protests against the planned Jaitapur Nuclear Power Project turned violent. Although protests have been ongoing for some years, they have gained greater prominence and support since Fukushima.

Italy

Prime Minister Silvio Berlusconi announced in 2009 that Italy would go nuclear again after its four atomic power plants were shut down following a 1987 nationwide referendum. But in the wake of the Fukushima crisis, antinuclear rallies drawing thousands have erupted in Italy, and the Italian government has "decided on a one-year moratorium on its plans to revive nuclear power".

A further Italian nuclear power referendum was held on 13 June 2011 and the No vote won 94,05 %, leading to cancellation of future nuclear power plants planned during the previous years, and due to the Italian nuclear power referendum turn out being over 50%+1 of the Italian population creates a legally binding cancellation of future plants.

Spain

In March 2011, hundreds of people took part in protests held across Spain to demand the closure of the country's six nuclear power stations, after Japan's nuclear accidents. Demonstrators, many with signs that read "No nuclear power, neither here nor in Japan", gathered in small groups in more than 30 cities, including Madrid, Barcelona, Seville and Valencia.

Sweden

A 2011 poll suggests that scepticism over nuclear power is growing in Sweden following Japan's nuclear crisis. 36 percent of respondents want to phase-out nuclear power, up from 15 percent in a similar survey two years ago.

Switzerland

Japan's Fukushima Dai-ichi nuclear disaster "has entirely changed the energy debate in Switzerland". In May 2011, some 20,000 people turned out for Switzerland's largest anti-nuclear power demonstration in 25 years. Demonstrators marched peacefully near the Beznau Nuclear Power Plant, the oldest in Switzerland, which started operating 40 years ago. Days after the anti-nuclear rally, Cabinet decided to ban the building of new nuclear power reactors. The country's five existing reactors would be allowed to continue operating, but "would not be replaced at the end of their life span".

TEPCO violates Human Rights

On 7 January 2014 the largest pension fund in The Netherlands announced, that it had sold all its investments in TEPCO, because the ABP found it unethical to invest in this company any longer. TEPCO was blamed for its conduct during and after the disaster. TEPCO had ignored the U.N. human rights, and had demonstrated that it had insufficient attention for public safety". There were insufficient measures to prevent environmental damage and it was impossible to move the company to different behavior. After all attempts of the ABP to change the attitude of the company had failed, all stock was sold in the first week of 2014.

== Re-evaluation of existing nuclear energy programs ==
=== Overview ===
Following the Fukushima nuclear disaster, Germany has permanently shut down eight of its reactors and pledged to close the rest by 2022. The Italians have voted overwhelmingly to keep their country non-nuclear. Switzerland and Spain have banned the construction of new reactors. Japan's prime minister has called for a dramatic reduction in Japan's reliance on nuclear power. Taiwan's president did the same. Mexico has sidelined construction of 10 reactors in favor of developing natural-gas-fired plants. Belgium is considering phasing out its nuclear plants, perhaps as early as 2015.

China—nuclear power's largest prospective market—suspended approvals of new reactor construction while conducting a lengthy nuclear-safety review. Neighboring India, another potential nuclear boom market, has encountered effective local opposition, growing national wariness about foreign nuclear reactors, and a nuclear liability controversy that threatens to prevent new reactor imports. There have been mass protests against the French-backed 9900 MW Jaitapur Nuclear Power Project in Maharashtra and the 2000 MW Koodankulam Nuclear Power Plant in Tamil Nadu. The state government of West Bengal state has also refused permission to a proposed 6000 MW facility near the town of Haripur that intended to host six Russian reactors.

In the United States, new-reactor construction has also suffered—not because of public opposition but because of economics and tougher, yet-to-be-determined, safety regulations. In 2007, U.S. utilities applied to the Nuclear Regulatory Commission to build 28 nuclear-power plants before 2020; now, if more than three come online before the end of the decade, it will be a major accomplishment.

France maintains the highest per capita generation of nuclear energy globally. Long cited as a benchmark for commercial nuclear development, the country is currently re-evaluating its long-term energy policy, with active debate regarding a potential partial phaseout.

=== Africa ===
- Niger – In January 2012, President Mahamadou Issoufou said that Niger will continue with its plans to build a civilian nuclear power plant in cooperation with other West African countries in the ECOWAS, rather than letting the Chernobyl and Fukushima disasters make Niger cancel its plans. He also stated that "In addition to renewable energy, nuclear energy is clean and low cost".

=== Americas ===
- Canada – On 16 March 2011, five days after the Fukushima I nuclear incident began, it was found that the Pickering Nuclear Generating Station in Pickering, Ontario, situated east of Toronto, was leaking demineralized water into Lake Ontario. While the Canadian Nuclear Safety Commission declared that the leak, caused by a pump seal failure, did not pose any threat to human health, many Canadians questioned the safety of nuclear power plants in Canada. Gordon Edwards, Canadian physicist and founder of the Canadian Coalition for Nuclear Responsibility, claimed that the leak "shows the potential for more significant nuclear contamination of Lake Ontario [compared to that of Japan's disaster]". He added that the source of the Pickering plant's leak was the same as that of the incident at Fukushima I and that the leak must not be taken lightly. The Gentilly Nuclear Generating Station near Bécancour, Quebec, is the only Canadian nuclear power plant near a fault line. Quebec Premier Jean Charest issued statements that the Gentilly-2 reactor was safe, and the Canadian Nuclear Safety Commission (CNSC) declared it could withstand earthquakes. The CNSC created policies that would ensure that nuclear plants could keep reactors cool even in the event of a total power loss by having portable generators and pumps available to take over. As a final resort, Canadian nuclear plants are able to use fire apparatus to pump cooling water into the reactor.
- Chile – In Chile, Emol reported on 16 March there has been much controversy over the installation of nuclear power plants, following the Chilean Government report that it was ready to sign a cooperation agreement with the United States Government on Nuclear Energy. The opposition urged a meeting on the plans with the Minister of Mines and Energy, Laurence Golborne.
- United States – U.S. President Obama and aides for former Senator Domenici publicly supported continued development of new U.S. nuclear power facilities. The influential The New York Times stated in an editorial on 14 March that "the unfolding Japanese tragedy also should prompt Americans to closely study our own plans for coping with natural disasters and with potential nuclear plant accidents to make sure they are, indeed, strong enough". A more definitive expression of the impact of the accidents in the United States was the decision by NRG Energy, Inc. to abandon already started construction on two new nuclear power plants in Texas. Analysts attributed the abandonment of the project to the financial situation of the plant-partner TEPCO, the inability raise other construction financing, the current low cost of electricity in Texas, and expected additional permitting delays.
- Venezuela – Venezuelan President Hugo Chavez announced a halt to freeze all nuclear power development projects for peaceful means, which included design of a nuclear power plant for which a contract had been made with Russia.

=== Asia & Pacific ===
- Australia – The Prime Minister of Australia, Julia Gillard, stated in Melbourne, "I don't see nuclear energy as part of our future. We are blessed with abundant sources of renewable energy, of clean energy, of solar, wind, tide, hot rocks. That's our future, not nuclear..." per a Reuters report of 22 March 2011. Australia has no nuclear power stations.
- China – ZSR reported on 14 March that During a News Conference of the Annual Meeting of National People's Congress of China, the Deputy Chief of Environmental Protection Authority of China, Mr Lijun Zhang had said: "We are concerned about the damage of the Nuclear Facility of Japan, concerned about the further development of this issue, we will learn from it, and will take it into account when we make strategic planning for the nuclear energy development in the future. However, our decision on development of more nuclear power plants and current arrangement on nuclear energy development will not be changed." On 16 March, China froze nuclear plant approvals. On 28 March, the Chinese government revised nuclear power targets, which would likely result "in a reduction of about 10 gigawatts in nuclear generating capacity from the 90 gigawatts previously expected to be built by 2020."
- India – The Prime Minister of India, Manmohan Singh, ordered the Nuclear Power Corporation of India to review the safety systems and designs of all the nuclear power reactors on 15 March. The Government of India was reported on 15 March to also be looking to put in place additional environmental safeguards to ensure safety of newly proposed nuclear reactors. Nuclear Power Corporation of India said on 14 March that the nuclear power stations in India survived the earthquake of 2001 Bhuj earthquake and the 2004 Indian Ocean earthquake and tsunami but there was "no room for complacency".
- Israel – Prime Minister Benjamin Netanyahu stated on 17 March 2011, that Israel was now unlikely to pursue civil nuclear energy.
- North Korea – The Korean Central News Agency reported on 31 March that dissatisfaction with the Naoto Kan administration has risen concerning the accident response in Japan. Also, Rodong Sinmun reported, "The situation of the nuclear plant accident get worse and worse every day, and made the international society worry greatly".
- Pakistan– The Government of Pakistan ordered the Pakistan Atomic Energy Commission (PAEC) to check and review the power plants security, system, and designs of all the atomic power reactors in the country. The Pakistan Nuclear Regulatory Authority (PNRA) issued safety guidelines in plants, and ordered to re-evaluate the designs of KANUPP-II and the Chashma Nuclear Power Plant in Chashman city, Pakistan today reported on 16 March 2011. The PAEC is continuously monitoring the flow of events in nuclear plants in Japan in the wake of the recent earthquake and tsunami there, APP concluded on 16 March 2011. According to the Jang News, Pakistan offered Japan to provide technical assistance to control to their nuclear radiation. On 20 March 2011, Jang News reported that scientists from PNRA and PAEC are ready to leave for Japan as soon as IAEA gives an approval. Japanese officials have accepted the Pakistan's offer, however, due to IAEA laws, both countries needs an approval from IAEA for such cooperation. According to the Foreign Office of Pakistan, Pakistani scientists are ready to leave for Japan as soon as IAEA gives an approval for such technical assistance.
- Taiwan has ordered the suspension of its plans to expand nuclear power until a full safety review is complete.
- Turkey – Turkish Prime Minister Recep Tayyip Erdogan reaffirmed his commitment of building Turkey's first nuclear plant at Akkuyu, Mersin Province.
- In July 2011 Kuwait scrapped the plan to build four nuclear power plants by 2022. After the Fukushima disaster, opposition against the plans started to emerge. Sabah al-Ahmad al-Jaber al-Sabah, emir of Kuwait, issued an order to dissolve the national nuclear energy committee. Besides the opposition, Kuwait is a small country, and it would be difficult to find a safe place for the nuclear waste the reactors would produce. Besides the cooperation with Japan, Kuwait did sign agreements on atomic energy with the United States, France and Russia.

=== Europe ===
- European Union – In an interview on ORF2, Austrian Environment Minister Nikolaus Berlakovich said that he would enter a request at the environmental meeting in Brussels on 14 March 2011 for a review of reactor safety. He emphasized both coolant and containment and compared these measures to reviews of the financial system after the banking crisis of 2008.

Connie Hedegaard, the European Commissioner for Climate Action stated on 17 March that generating energy from wind turbines at sea would be cheaper than building new atomic power plants.
On 23 March a European Union-wide stress test was announced after an emergency meeting of the European Council of Ministers on Energy. All 143 nuclear power plants in the Union were planned to be subject to an assessment and it was also hoped plants of neighbouring countries were taken into account. The evaluation would include "vulnerability to seismic events, their exposure to flooding, as well as man-made disasters (such as power cuts and terrorism), with special attention being paid to cooling and back-up systems."

- France – In a letter dated 23 March, Prime Minister Francois Fillon asked the Nuclear Safety Authority to carry out an 'open and transparent' audit each of its nuclear installations, looking at the risks of flood, earthquake, loss of power and cooling, and accident management processes, in order to identify any improvements that should be made in the light of lessons learned from Fukushima. The initial conclusions are expected by the end of 2011. France conducted a more limited review following flooding at its Blayais Nuclear Power Plant in 1999. President Nicolas Sarkozy has stressed the need for dialogue but said that France had chosen nuclear power for reasons of energy security and to counter greenhouse gas emissions. However pressure to permanently close the Fessenheim Nuclear Power Plant, the oldest in France, is growing within France and in neighbouring Switzerland and Germany.
- Germany – During the chancellorship of Gerhard Schröder, the social democratic-green government had decreed Germany's final retreat from using nuclear power by 2022, but the phase-out plan was delayed in late 2010, when during the chancellorship of Angela Merkel the conservative-liberal government decreed a 12-year delay of the schedule. This delay provoked protests, including a human chain of 50,000 from Stuttgart to the nearby nuclear plant in Neckarwestheim. This protest had long been scheduled for 12 March, which now happened to be the day of the explosion of reactor block 1. Anti-nuclear demonstrations on 12 March attracted 100 000 across Germany. On 14 March 2011, in response to the renewed concern about the use of nuclear energy the Fukushima incident raised in the German public and in light of upcoming elections in three German states, Merkel declared a 3-months moratorium on the reactor lifespan extension passed in 2010. On 15 March, the German government announced that it would temporarily shut down 7 of its 17 reactors, i.e. all reactors that went online before 1981. Former proponents of nuclear energy such as Angela Merkel, Guido Westerwelle, Stefan Mappus have changed their positions, yet 71% of the population believe that to be a tactical manoeuvre related to upcoming state elections. In the largest anti-nuclear demonstration ever held in Germany, some 250,000 people protested on 26 March under the slogan "heed Fukushima – shut off all nuclear plants."
- Italy – A moratorium on the construction of nuclear power plants was approved on 24 March by the Council of Ministers of Italy for a period of 1 year. A further Italian nuclear power referendum was held on 13 June 2011 and the No vote won, leading to cancellation of future nuclear power plants planned during the previous years, and due to the Italian nuclear power referendum turn out being over 50%+1 of the Italian population creates a legally binding cancellation of future plants.
- Netherlands – Maxime Verhagen, Minister of Energy, Agriculture and Innovation, wrote in a letter to the House of Representatives that the experience of Japan would be taken into account in the definition of the requirements for a new nuclear power plant to be built in 2015. Prime minister Mark Rutte indicated on 18 March there were no plans to change operations at Borssele nuclear power plant and called the German moratorium 'curious' (Dutch: merkwaardig).
- Slovakia – The Slovak republic said in the week after the accidents it would continue with the construction of two new VVER 440/V-213 reactors (PWR) at the Mochovce Nuclear Power Plant. All blocks at the Mochovce plant, existing and under construction, shall be updated and modernised to withstand higher earthquakes than the current limit.
- Russia – On 15 March, Prime Minister Vladimir Putin ordered officials to check Russian nuclear facilities and to review the country's ambitious plans to develop atomic energy amid Japan's nuclear crisis.
- Spain – Spanish Prime Minister Jose Luis Rodriguez Zapatero ordered on 16 March a review of his country's nuclear power plants.
- Switzerland – Swiss Federal Councillor Doris Leuthard announced on 14 March a freeze in the authorisation procedures for three new nuclear power plants, and ordered a safety review of the country's plants.
- United Kingdom – On 12 March, British Energy Minister Chris Huhne wrote to Dr Mike Weightman, head of the HSE's Nuclear Directorate, asking for a report 'on the implications of the situation and the lessons to be learned for the UK nuclear industry. The report is to be delivered within 6 months, with an interim report by mid-May, 'prepared in close cooperation with the International nuclear community and other nuclear safety regulators'. On 15 March, Huhne expressed regret that some European politicians were 'rushing to judgement' before assessments had been carried out, and said that it was too early to determine whether the willingness of the private sector to invest in new nuclear plants would be affected. Dr Weightman visited Japan in May with an IAEA team.

== Nuclear risk perception ==
The Fukushima Daiichi nuclear accident significantly influenced perceptions of nuclear risk worldwide and has been widely used in the academic literature as an exogenous shock to study behavioural and economic responses to nuclear hazards. Empirical studies document heterogeneous effects across countries: no detectable impact on housing markets near nuclear plants in Sweden, non-significant or short-lived effects in the United States, large but short-lived effects in China, and large, persistent effects in Germany, largely attributable to anticipated nuclear phase-outs and associated employment effects. These mixed findings can reflect the influence of country-specific factors such as policy responses, labour-market spillovers, insurance coverage, risk preferences, and housing-market institutions. Evidence from England indicates a large and persistent decline in housing prices near nuclear facilities (in a 20 km radius) compared to areas further away following Fukushima. As the United Kingdom maintained its commitment to nuclear power, the observed price adjustment primarily reflects increased risk perception rather than expectations of plant closures. The UK policy context contrasts with that of Germany where the government planned a phasing out of nuclear power with large, expected employment effects at the local level, triggering effects on housing markets uncovered in Bauer, Thomas K.; Braun, Sebastian T.; Kvasnicka, Michael (2017). "Nuclear power plant closures and local housing values: Evidence from Fukushima and the German housing market". Journal of Urban Economics. 99: 94–106.. The UK study further shows that the price decrease varies across at risk areas: it is concentrated in areas near nuclear whose labour force is more mobile. It also provides evidence of increasing socioeconomic deprivation in areas located within a 20-kilometre radius of nuclear power plants, relative to the rest of the country, both following the opening of nuclear facilities and after the Fukushima nuclear accident.

== Renewable energy ==
Nancy Folbre, an economics professor, has said that the biggest positive result of the Fukushima Daiichi nuclear disaster could be renewed public support for the commercialization of renewable energy technologies.

In 2011, London-based bank HSBC said: "With Three Mile Island and Fukushima as a backdrop, the US public may find it difficult to support major nuclear new build and we expect that no new plant extensions will be granted either. Thus we expect the clean energy standard under discussion in US legislative chambers will see a far greater emphasis on gas and renewables plus efficiency".

In 2011, Deutsche Bank analysts concluded that "the global impact of the Fukushima accident is a fundamental shift in public perception with regard to how a nation prioritizes and values its populations health, safety, security, and natural environment when determining its current and future energy pathways". As a consequence, "renewable energy will be a clear long-term winner in most energy systems, a conclusion supported by many voter surveys conducted over the past few weeks. At the same time, we consider natural gas to be, at the very least, an important transition fuel, especially in those regions where it is considered secure".

In September 2011, Mycle Schneider said that the Fukushima disaster can be understood as a unique chance "to get it right" on energy policy. "Germany – with its nuclear phase-out decision based on a highly successful renewable energy program – and Japan – having suffered a painful shock but possessing unique technical capacities and societal discipline – can be at the forefront of an authentic paradigm shift toward a truly sustainable, low-carbon and nuclear-free energy policy".

== See also ==
- Anti-nuclear movement
- Anti-nuclear protests
- Humanitarian response to the 2011 Tōhoku earthquake and tsunami
- Japanese reaction to Fukushima Daiichi nuclear disaster
- Nuclear energy policy
- Nuclear power debate
- Nuclear renaissance
- Radiation effects from the Fukushima Daiichi nuclear disaster
- Timeline of the Fukushima Daiichi nuclear disaster
