= Chiu Yi =

Taiwanese politician

- 邱毅
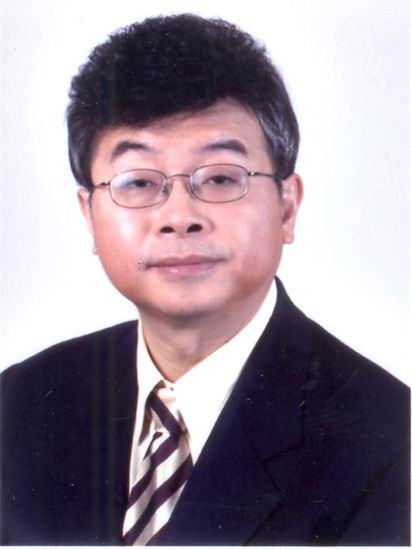
- Official portrait, 2005

Member of the Legislative Yuan
- In office 1 February 2002 – 31 January 2012
- Constituency: See list: Party-list (2008–2012) Kaohsiung II (2002–2008)

Personal details
- Born: 8 May 1956 (age 70) Yanchao, Kaohsiung County, Taiwan
- Party: Independent
- Other political affiliations: People First Party; New Party; Kuomintang
- Education: National Taiwan University (BA, MA, PhD); Cornell University

Chiu Yi (Chinese: 邱毅; pinyin: Qiū Yì; born 8 May 1956) is a Taiwanese economist and politician. He is a former member of the Kuomintang and People First Party, and a member of the Legislative Yuan from 2002 to 2012. He was known for his pro-CCP unification views. He has also been a member of the New Party.

== Education ==
After graduating from Kaohsiung Senior High School, Chiu attended National Taiwan University, where he earned a bachelor's degree in rural sociology, a master's degree in agricultural economics, and, in 1988, his Ph.D. in behavioral economics. His doctoral dissertation was titled, "A study on the determination of corporate performance and internal interactive behavior" (Chinese: 企業績效的決定與內部互動行為之研究). After receiving his doctorate, he completed postdoctoral research in the United States at Cornell University.

== Political career ==
In the 2004 Taiwanese legislative election, as a member of the People First Party, he was one of five legislators elected from the Kaohsiung 2nd electoral district. In the 2008 Taiwanese legislative election he was listed fifth on the Kuomintang at-large party list, and was elected to the legislature. In the 2012 Taiwanese legislative election, he ran on the New Party ticket in Kaohsiung's 7th district, losing to the Democratic Progressive Party candidate Chao Din-lin.

In the 2020 Taiwanese legislative election he was listed eighth on the Kuomintang party list but relinquished his placement after public criticism and accepted a nomination to be placed at the top of the New Party at-large party list. The New Party did not meet the 5% vote threshold and therefore none of its party list legislators were elected.

== Cross-strait relations ==
In March 2019, during a cross-strait forum in Fujian, he stated that pro-independence figures could be beheaded during an annexation of Taiwan by China. In December 2019, he was criticized for appearing on Chinese state media discussing details of Taiwan's defense systems.

== Controversies ==
Chiu was indicted in April 2004 for attempting to break into the Kaohsiung District Court building after the announcement of Chen Shui-bian's presidential election victory, for which he was sentenced to serve a year in prison.

In July 2006, he filed a special funds abuse lawsuit against then-president Chen Shui-bian. In November 2019, he filed a defamation lawsuit against Taipei mayor Ko Wen-je for a comment that his nomination for the Kuomintang and New Party legislator-at-large list in the 2020 Taiwanese legislative election could indicate that China's Taiwan Affairs Office has "control" over the two parties.

In January 2008, he was found guilty of slander for accusing DPP chairman Yu Shyi-kun of illegal lobbying. In 2015 he was sued twice by the DPP for defamation over statements he made regarding presidential candidate Tsai Ing-wen's real-estate dealings.

Former KMT president Ma Ying-jeou also considered a lawsuit against Chiu in 2020 for alleging that Ma was responsible for his removal from the KMT legislator-at-large party list in the 2020 Taiwanese legislative election.
