= Sam Chun Dang Pharm =

South Korean pharmaceutical company

Sam Chun Dang Pharm Co., Ltd.
- Native name: 삼천당제약
- Type: Public
- Traded as: KRX: 000250
- Industry: Pharmaceuticals
- Founded: December 29, 1943; 82 years ago
- Headquarters: Seocho-gu, Seoul, South Korea
- Key people: Yoon Dae-in (Chairman); Chun In-seok (Chief Executive Officer)
- Products: Ophthalmic drugs, cardiovascular drugs, antibiotics, biosimilars, GLP-1 generics
- Website: www.scd.co.kr

Sam Chun Dang Pharm Co., Ltd. (Korean: 삼천당제약; Hanja: 三千堂製藥; RR: Samcheondang jeyak), commonly abbreviated as SCD, is a South Korean pharmaceutical company engaged in the development, manufacturing, and sale of prescription medicines. Founded in 1943, the company is headquartered in Seocho-gu, Seoul, with manufacturing operations at the Hyannam Pharmaceutical Industrial Complex in Hwaseong, Gyeonggi Province. SCD is listed on the Korea Exchange (KRX: 000250).

The company is best known for its ophthalmic products, which accounts for approximately half of its total revenues, and has attracted attention for its development of an aflibercept biosimilar (SCD411) and an oral semaglutide generic.

== History ==
Sam Chun Dang Pharm was established on December 29, 1943, to manufacture and sell pharmaceutical products. The company is widely recognized as the first Korean pharmaceutical company to manufacture eye drops.

In 1985, SCD constructed a KGMP-certified factory within the Hyannam Pharmaceutical Industrial Complex in Hwaseong, Gyeonggi Province.

In 2013, SCD acquired Optus Pharmaceuticals, at the time the leading domestic manufacturer of single-use ophthalmic eye drops.

SCD received the European Union Good Manufacturing Practice certification from the UK MHRA in March 2015, and a further EU GMP certificate from Germany's BGV in April 2018, allowing the company to expand into international markets.

== Products ==
=== SCD411: Aflibercept Biosimilar ===
SCD411 is a biosimilar referencing Regeneron and Bayer's Eylea, an anti-VEGF therapy indicated for neovascular age-related macular degeneration (wet AMD) and other retinal diseases. The drug completed global Phase 3 clinical trials in 2022 across 14 countries, involving 576 patients at 132 hospitals.

SCD411 received regulatory approvals in Canada (June 2025), Europe (August 2025), South Korea, and Japan (both September 2025), in both vial and pre-filled syringe formats.

=== Oral GLP-1 Semaglutide Generic ===
SCD has been developing an oral generic version of semaglutide, the active ingredient in Novo Nordisk's Wegovy and Ozempic.

In January 2026, SCD signed a partnership agreement with Daiichi Sankyo Espha, a subsidiary of Japan's Daiichi Sankyo, for the exclusive sale of oral semaglutide generics in Japan.

Some industry observers and analysts have questioned the company's public statements regarding this product. A commentary published by the Korea Biomedical Review in July 2025 noted that SCD's claims of a potential 2026 market launch for its oral semaglutide generic appeared to overstate the company's regulatory position, given that secondary patents on semaglutide formulations are widely expected to remain in force until at least 2031 in most major markets.

== See also ==
- Biosimilar
- Semaglutide
- Aflibercept
