= Chen Chao-ming =

Taiwanese politician

Chen Chao-ming MLY
- 陳超明
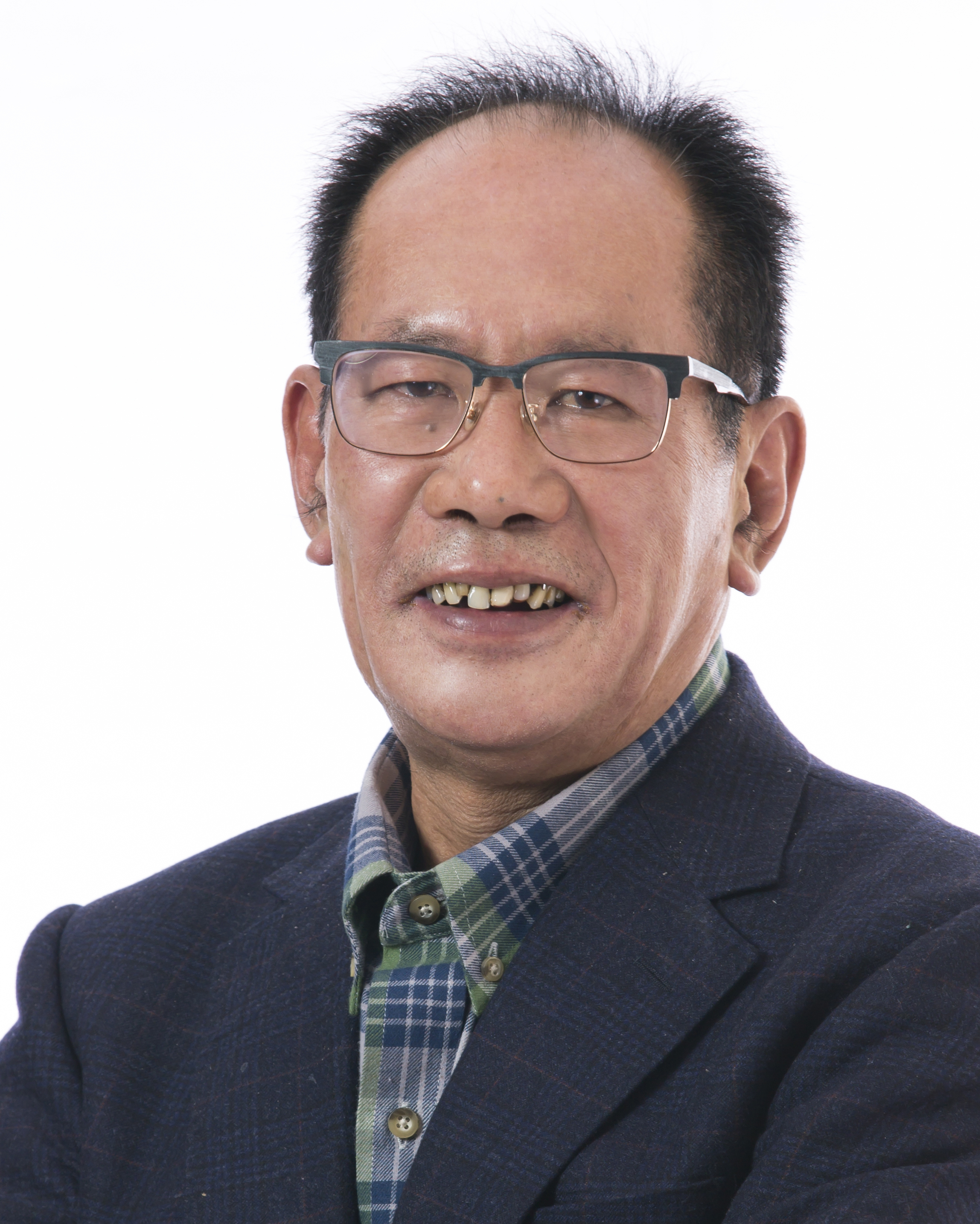
- Chen in March 2016

Member of the Legislative Yuan
- In office 1 February 2012 – 22 July 2022
- Preceded by: Kang Shih-ju
- Constituency: Miaoli 1
- In office 1 February 1999 – 31 January 2002
- Constituency: Miaoli County

Personal details
- Born: 17 December 1951 (age 74) Miaoli County, Taiwan
- Party: Kuomintang (since 2011); Democratic Progressive Party (2004)
- Education: National Chengchi University (BA)

Chen Chao-ming (Chinese: 陳超明; pinyin: Chén Chāomíng; born 17 December 1951) is a Taiwanese politician.

== Education ==
Chen attended elementary school in Zhunan, middle school in Toufen, and graduated from National Chutung Senior High School. Subsequently, Chen studied public administration at National Chengchi University and graduated with a bachelor's degree in the subject.

== Political career ==
Chen was elected to the Legislative Yuan as an independent in 1998 and served until 2002. He joined the Democratic Progressive Party for the 2004 election cycle, but did not win. In 2011, Chen was named Kuomintang candidate for Miaoli County, and won. He retained his seat in the 2016 elections, defeating former legislators Tu Wen-ching and Kang Shih-ju. In his 2020 legislative campaign, Chen again received support from the Kuomintang.

Chen's Kuomintang membership was suspended in August 2020, after he was detained and questioned regarding a legal case involving allegations of bribery. The Taipei District Court ruled in July 2022 that Chen had violated the Anti-Corruption Act, sentenced him to seven years and eight months imprisonment, and seized NT$1 million from him.
