= 2008 Taiwanese transitional justice referendum =

Nationwide referendum proposal 3
- 12 January 2008
- 你是否同意依下列原則制定「政黨不當取得財產處理條例」，將中國國民黨黨產還給全民：國民黨及其附隨組織的財產，除黨費、政治獻金及競選補助金外，均推定為不當取得的財產，應還給人民。已處分者，應償還價額。 (See below for translation)

Results
Choice	Votes	%
Yes	3,891,170	91.46%
No	363,494	8.54%
Valid votes	4,254,664	93.49%
Invalid or blank votes	296,217	6.51%
Total votes	4,550,881	100.00%
Registered voters/turnout	17,277,720	26.34%

Nationwide referendum proposal 4
- 12 January 2008
- 您是否同意制定法律追究國家領導人及其部屬，因故意或重大過失之措施，造成國家嚴重損害之責任，並由立法院設立調查委員會調查，政府各部門應全力配合，不得抗拒，以維全民利益，並懲處違法失職人員，追償不當所得？ (See below for translation)

Results
Choice	Votes	%
Yes	2,304,136	58.17%
No	1,656,890	41.83%
Valid votes	3,961,026	87.91%
Invalid or blank votes	544,901	12.09%
Total votes	4,505,927	100.00%
Registered voters/turnout	17,277,720	26.08%

Two referendums were held in Taiwan on 12 January 2008, alongside legislative elections. One (officially numbered as Question 3) concerned transitional justice and the treatment of contentious properties acquired by the Kuomintang, whilst a counter-referendum (Question 4) was initiated by the Kuomintang on alleged corruption in politics.

Although a majority of voters voted in favour of both proposals, voter turnout was only 26%, well below the 50% required to make the results valid. The legislative elections had a turnout of around 58%.

== Questions ==
=== Proposal 3 ===
This question was officially championed by former premier Yu Shyi-kun.

Do you agree that the following principles should be followed to legislate a ‘Regulation for the Disposal of Properties Inappropriately Acquired by Political Parties’, in order to return such properties of the Kuomintang to the people?: Kuomintang’s and its associate organization’s properties – outside of party dues, political donations, and public subsidies – should be presumed inappropriately acquired and returned to the people. Those already liquidated, the party should compensate at market value. (你是否同意依下列原則制定「政黨不當取得財產處理條例」，將中國國民黨黨產還給全民：國民黨及其附隨組織的財產，除黨費、政治獻金及競選補助金外，均推定為不當取得的財產，應還給人民。已處分者，應償還價額。)

=== Proposal 4 ===
This question was officially championed by former finance minister Wang Chien-shien.

Do you agree that legislation should be enacted to investigate the responsibility of leaders of the nation and their subordinates, when there is grave damage to the nation due to their wrongful intentions or grave failure in carrying out their duties? Further, do you agree that Commissions of Inquiry should be set up by the Legislative Yuan to investigate such matters; and that the departments of the government should co-operate fully without resistance, in order that the benefits of the people will be preserved? That the personnel criminally at fault should be punished and their illegal income be recovered? (您是否同意制定法律追究國家領導人及其部屬，因故意或重大過失之措施，造成國家嚴重損害之責任，並由立法院設立調查委員會調查，政府各部門應全力配合，不得抗拒，以維全民利益，並懲處違法失職人員，追償不當所得？)

== Campaign ==
The Kuomintang urged voters to boycott both referendums to prevent them from reaching the 50% voter turnout needed to for validate the result, and there was much pre-election controversy over the format and structure of the balloting. Initially, the Kuomintang was in favor of a two-step balloting system where voters would vote for the legislative elections and then for the referendum, while the DPP was in favor of a one-step system in which voters would get all four ballots to vote. The final system was a one-step, two-table system in which voters would get the ballots at separate tables but would mark the ballot papers together.

== Results ==
Question	For		Against		Invalid/ blank	Total	Registered voters	Turnout	Outcome
Question	Votes	%	Votes	%	Invalid/ blank	Total	Registered voters	Turnout	Outcome
Proposal 3	3,891,170	91.46	363,494	8.54	296,217	4,550,881	17,277,720	26.34	Quorum not reached
Proposal 4	2,304,136	58.17	1,656,890	41.83	544,901	4,505,927	17,277,720	26.08	Quorum not reached
Source: CEC
