= Chang Sho-wen =

Taiwanese politician (born 1971)

- 張碩文
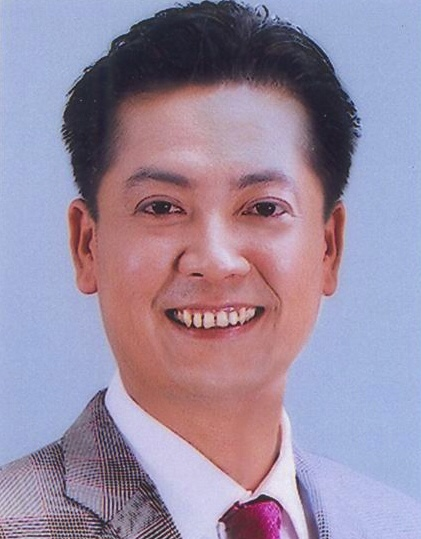

Member of the Legislative Yuan
- In office 1 February 2005 – 30 June 2009
- Succeeded by: Liu Chien-kuo
- Constituency: Yunlin 2

Personal details
- Born: 7 May 1971 (age 55) Yunlin County, Taiwan
- Party: People First Party (since 2015)
- Other political affiliations: Kuomintang (until 2015)
- Education: Colorado Christian University (MS)

Chang Sho-wen (Chinese: 張碩文; pinyin: Zhāng Shuòwén; born 7 May 1971) is a Taiwanese politician. He first won election to the Legislative Yuan in 2004 and was reelected in 2008. Partway through his second term, Chang was removed from office on charges of electoral fraud. He left the Kuomintang in 2015 and joined the People First Party.

== Political career ==
Chang was first elected to the Legislative Yuan in 2004. During his 2004 campaign, he was questioned by Yunlin County prosecutors as part of a large investigation of vote buying. Chang was allowed to take his seat on the legislature. During part of his first term, he was the secretary-general of the Kuomintang caucus. Chang has also been known to participate in fights on the legislative floor. In 2007, he threw a lunchbox at fellow legislator Yin Ling-ying over a disagreement on amendments to the Farmers' and Fishers' Association Law.

The next legislative elections were scheduled for 2007, but it was eventually decided to hold both the presidential and legislative elections closer together in 2008, a move Chang supported. Chang was reelected, but the election result was challenged by Democratic Progressive Party opponent Liu Chien-kuo on 20 November 2008. Annulment of the election was granted on 30 June 2009 by the Taiwan High Court, which upheld the ruling of the Yunlin District Court, despite Chang's appeal to the Control Yuan. Chang became the second lawmaker after Lee Yi-ting to lose his seat in the seventh session of the Legislative Yuan.

Chang's father Chang Hui-yuan tried to join the Kuomintang to run for his son's vacated seat, submitting the application on 17 July. The KMT chose not to accept it, and Chang Hui-yuan ended his bid to join the political party, choosing instead to run as an independent. The by-election, beset by another round of electoral fraud accusations, was won by Democratic Progressive Party candidate Liu Chien-kuo in a three-way contest.

Chang Sho-wen led Sean Lien's Taipei mayoral campaign in 2014. However, Chang grew increasingly critical of the Kuomintang and chairman Ma Ying-jeou, and the party officially expelled him on 15 July 2015, though he had renounced his membership to join the People First Party in June. Chang was tabbed to run in New Taipei's 3rd district under the PFP banner, and lost. He later served as director general of the People First Party and led its organization department. In November 2019, the People First Party ranked Chang the sixth at-large legislative candidate on its party list for the 2020 election.

== Electoral results ==
=== 2016 legislative election ===
Legislative Election 2016: New Taipei 3rd district
Party	Candidate	Votes	%	±%
DPP	Gao Jyh-peng	96,557	54.54	
KMT	Li Chien-lung	62,723	35.43	
People First	Chang Sho-wen	13,375	7.56	
Trees	Zhao Yinhong	1,314	0.74	
Others	Lin Qiying	1,114	0.63	
Others	Chen Zhangfa	655	0.37	
Others	Xiao Zhonghan	546	0.31	
Independent	Su Qingyan	429	0.24	
Independent	Huang Mao	315	0.18	
Majority		33,834	19.11	
Total valid votes		177,028	98.15	
Rejected ballots		3,333	1.85	
DPP hold		Swing		
Turnout		180,361	69.58	
Registered electors		259,224		
