= Chang Shiow-jen =

Taiwanese politician

Chang Shiow-jen (Chinese: 張秀珍; born 1 August 1951) is a Taiwanese politician.

== Education and career ==
Chang is a graduate of Ming Chuan University. She then took courses in business administration at New York University and in politics at Harvard University. She was elected to the National Assembly in 1996. Chang did not complete her term as an assembly member, as she was subsequently elected to the Legislative Yuan in 1998, and won reelection in 2001. She represented overseas Chinese on behalf of the Democratic Progressive Party while sitting on the Legislative Yuan. In 2003, she advocated for Taiwan to attend the 56th World Health Assembly. Chang stepped down at the end of her second legislative term in 2005. She was placed on the Democratic Progressive Party list for the 2008 legislative election, but not elected to office.
