= Liu Chien-kuo =

Taiwanese politician (born 1969)

Liu Chien-kuo MLY
- 劉建國
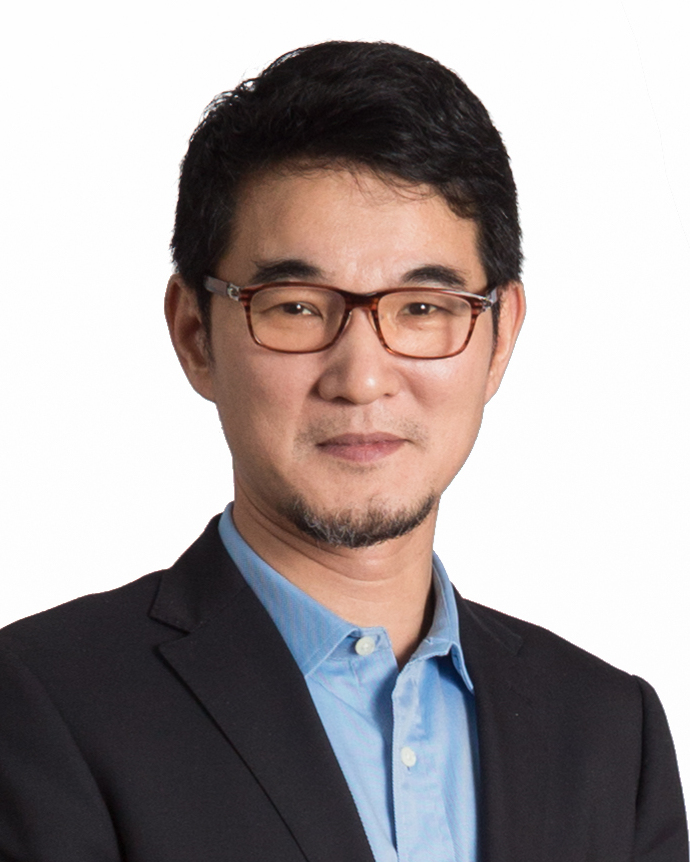
- Liu in 2016

Member of the Legislative Yuan
- Incumbent
- Assumed office 5 October 2009
- Preceded by: Chang Sho-wen
- Constituency: Yunlin 2

Personal details
- Born: 9 March 1969 (age 57) Douliu, Yunlin County, Taiwan
- Party: Democratic Progressive Party
- Education: National Open University (BA); Meiho University (BSW); Nanhua University (MA)

Liu Chien-kuo (Chinese: 劉建國; pinyin: Liú Jiànguó; born 9 March 1969) is a Taiwanese politician. A former member of the Yunlin County Council, he has represented Yunlin County in the Legislative Yuan since 2009.

== Early life and education ==
Liu was born on March 9, 1969, in Douliu, Yunlin. After high school, he graduated from National Open University with a bachelor's degree in public administration and earned a second bachelor's degree, a Bachelor of Social Work (B.S.W.), from Meiho University. Later, he also earned a Master of Arts (M.A.) in tourism management from Nanhua University.

== Political career ==
Liu served on the Yunlin County Council before running for a legislative seat in 2008. In January 2008, he filed a lawsuit against Chang Sho-wen, accusing Chang of bribery. He had lost to the Kuomintang candidate in the legislative elections held that month and in June 2009, Chang's election was annulled. Liu faced Lee Ying-yuan in a primary, and received the official backing of the Democratic Progressive Party. A by-election for Chang's vacated seat was held in September, and Liu won handily. In 2011, he joined the DPP-affiliated Our Generation Alliance led by Koo Kwang-ming. Liu's successful 2012 reelection campaign featured a hunger strike. Liu was a DPP candidate for the Yunlin County Magistracy in 2014, but ended his campaign after losing the party primary to Lee Chin-yung. He returned to the legislature in 2016. The Democratic Progressive Party nominated Liu as its candidate for the Yunlin County magistracy in April 2022.

== Political positions ==
Many farmers in Liu's home district raise pigs. To help them, he has spoken out against "free economic pilot zones" that he believe hurts Taiwan's agricultural sector. Liu has repeatedly attempted to amend environmental laws in Taiwan. His proposed changes include developing a system to track pollutant emissions, and asking the Environmental Protection Administration to specifically track air quality in high-risk areas, such as in temples in which incense is burned. Liu has specifically focused on passing legislation related to harmful particulates in the air. He has also participated in environmental protests, and have provided a platform for environmental groups to criticize industrial companies such as Formosa Petrochemical Corporation. On the subject of United States beef imports in Taiwan, Liu repeatedly stated throughout his first term in office that he is against the use of ractopamine in animal feed and does not wish for the government to lift the ban on ractopamine by executive order, but only by legislative consent. In 2012, he suggested that military personnel switch to eating pork instead of beef due to the ractopamine issue, a stance that was ridiculed online and which the military described as excessive.

== Personal life ==
Liu and Chang Sho-wen, who have faced each other in two elections, fought while attending a banquet in 2015.

Liu announced in June 2016 that his personal relationship with Adrean Lee, whom he and Chang had both dated, had ended.
