= Wu Ming-ming =

Taiwanese economist and politician

Wu Ming-ming MLY
- 吳明敏

Member of the Legislative Yuan
- In office 27 January 2006 – 31 January 2008
- Preceded by: Tsai Ing-wen
- Constituency: Party-list

Personal details
- Born: October 12, 1948 (age 77) Kaohsiung, Taiwan
- Party: Democratic Progressive Party
- Education: National Chung Hsing University (BS, MS); Ohio State University (PhD)

Wu Ming-ming (Chinese: 吳明敏; born October 12, 1948) is a Taiwanese economist and politician who served on the Legislative Yuan from 2006 to 2008.

== Early life and education ==
Wu was born on October 12, 1948, in Kaohsiung. He graduated from National Chung Hsing University with a Bachelor of Science (B.S.) in agricultural economics in 1971 and completed military service from 1971 to 1973 in the Republic of China Army, attaining the rank of second lieutenant. He then returned to National Chung Hsing University and obtained his Master of Science (M.S.) in agricultural economics in 1975. From 1975 to 1977, he was an assistant researcher in the university's department of agricultural economics before becoming a lecturer in the department in 1977.

In 1982, Wu went to the United States to complete doctoral studies at Ohio State University, where he earned his Ph.D. in agricultural economics and rural sociology in 1986 under professors David E. Hahn, Robert E. Jacobson, and Cameron S. Thraen on a scholarship provided by the National Science Council. His doctoral dissertation was titled, "The Demand Analysis for Four Major Milk and Dairy Products in the United States: An Application of Logistic Microdata Approach."

== Career ==
After receiving his doctorate, Wu returned to Taiwan and taught marketing at NCHU, as part of an academic career that spanned three decades. Wu was also active in the Taiwan Agricultural Academia-Industry Alliance. He took office as an alternate legislator-at large on 27 January 2006. As a lawmaker, Wu took an interest in Chinese violations of Taiwanese trademarks, and expressed concern about the quality of hairy crabs imported from China. He advocated for the end of a ban on the use of ractopamine in July 2007, but stated in August that restrictions on the feed additive should not be removed. After stepping down from the legislature in 2008, Wu became an honorary professor at NCHU. In a 2010 editorial published in the Taipei Times, Wu argued against signing the Economic Cooperation Framework Agreement with China. He later joined the faculty of Kainan University. Wu was found not guilty of subornation of perjury and corruption in 2013, and filed a counter lawsuit against Ministry of Justice investigators.
