= Chen Yao-chang =

Taiwanese hematologist (1949-2025)

Chen Yao-chang (Mandarin Chinese: 陳耀昌; February 9, 1949 – November 17, 2025) was a Taiwanese hematologist and novelist.

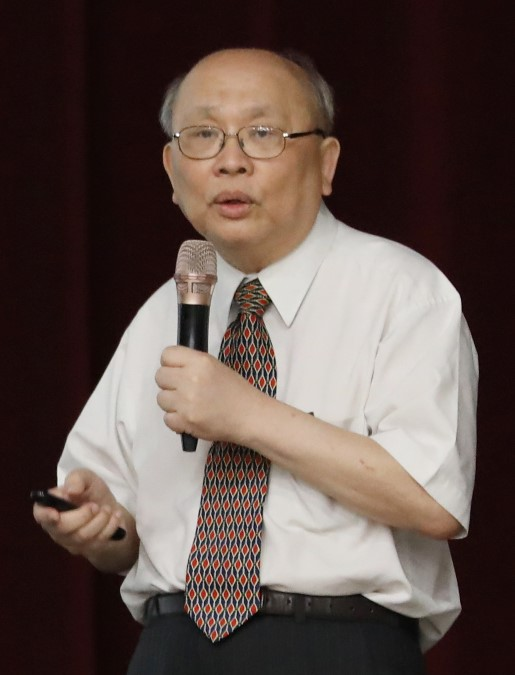
Chen Yao-Chang

== Life and career ==
Yao-chang was born in Tainan on February 9, 1949. He was a hematologist and oncologist at National Taiwan University Hospital for more than 30 years, and completed Taiwan's first bone marrow transplant in 1983, becoming a pioneer in bone marrow transplantation in Taiwan and laying the foundation for bone marrow banking. From 1993 to 1995, he traveled to Ho Chi Minh City to assist in the establishment of a bone marrow transplant center in Vietnam.

He was a pioneer in stem cell research, serving as the founding director of the first stem cell center of the National Institutes of Health from 2002 to 2004, and founding the Taiwan Cell Medicine Association in 2014. In 2004, he served as the founding director of the Institute of Forensic Medicine at National Taiwan University, and in 2005, he promoted the third reading of the "Forensic Physician Act".

Yao-chang died on November 17, 2025, at the age of 76.
