= Chen Chieh-ju (born 1944) =

Taiwanese disability rights activist and politician (born 1944)

Chen Chieh-ju MLY
- 陳節如
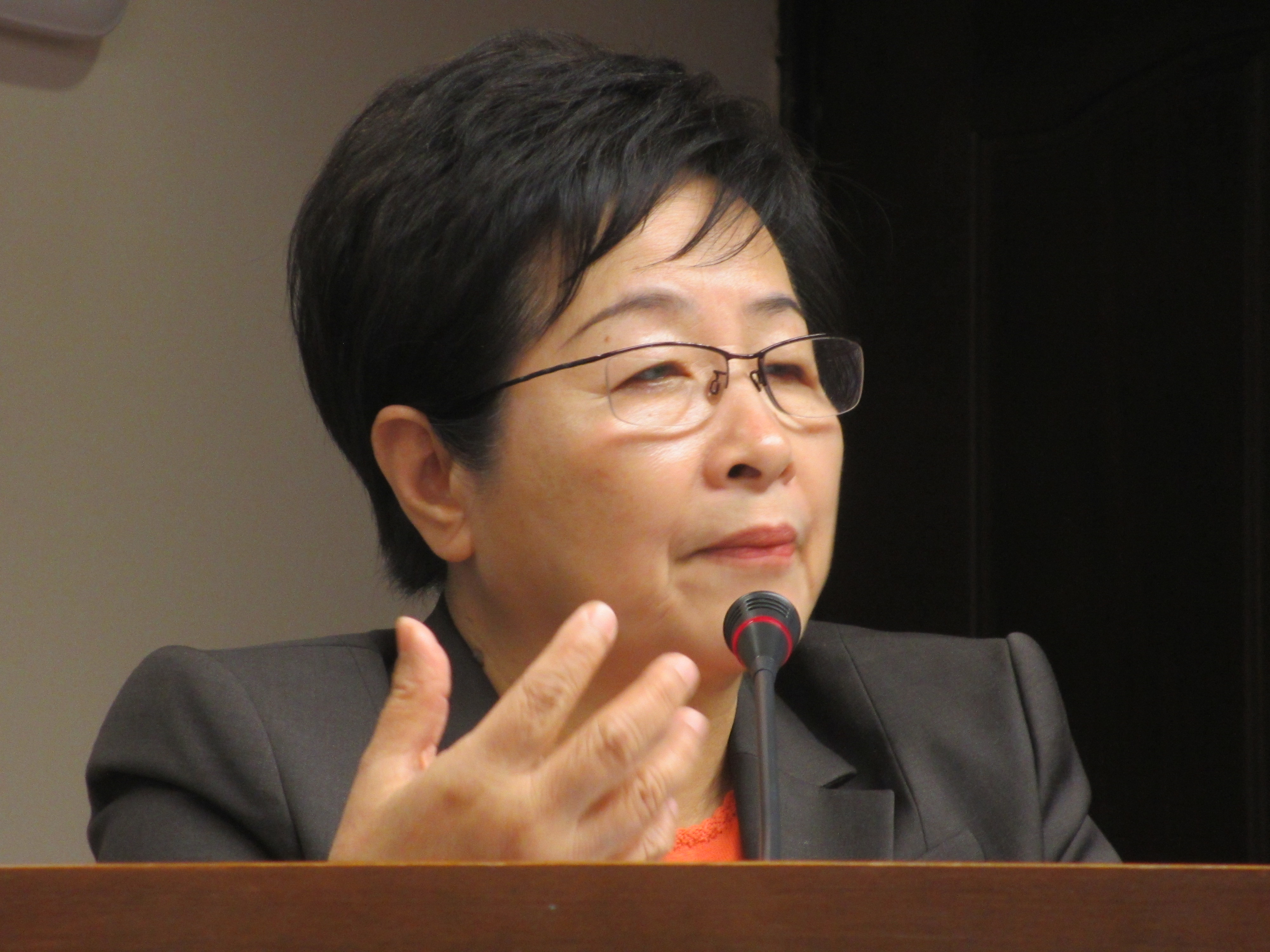

Member of the Legislative Yuan
- In office 1 February 2008 – 31 January 2016
- Constituency: Republic of China

Personal details
- Born: 3 March 1944 (age 82) Giran, Taihoku Prefecture, Japanese Taiwan (present-day Yilan City, Taiwan)
- Party: Democratic Progressive Party
- Education: National Taiwan Normal University (BA)

Chen Chieh-ju (Chinese: 陳節如; born 3 March 1944) is a Taiwanese disability rights activist and politician who served in the Legislative Yuan from 2008 to 2016 as a member of the Democratic Progressive Party.

== Early life and education ==
Chen attended National Lanyang Girls' Senior High School in Yilan and later earned a bachelor's degree in English from National Taiwan Normal University.

== Activism ==
Chen has served the Parents' Association for Persons with Intellectual Disability as chairperson. The group has partnered with other organizations to run a charity car wash staffed by people with disabilities. In 2003, Chen stated that she would not oppose permitting sighted, licensed masseuses to operate as long as blind masseuses continued receiving strong legal protections. She personally criticized students who protested against Chen Shui-bian's reelection as president in 2004, commenting, "There is no meaning in their protest. If they want to talk, they should be out there talking about issues relating to them. Why are their demands the same as the pro-blue camp's?" In 2006, she voiced opposition to revisions of the National Pension Draft Law, stating that pensions should be collected based on a person's ability to work, not the severity of their disability. Later that year, she blamed legislator Lin Yi-shih for stripping funding from the community healthcare system, which caused many hospitals' developmental delay assessment units to close.

== Political career ==
In 2007, Chen was ranked first on the Democratic Progressive Party list and subsequently won election to the Legislative Yuan.

In April 2008, Chen opposed an amendment to the Statute Governing Public Welfare Lotteries that reclassified sports lotteries as a subset of public welfare lotteries while mandating that eighty percent of the funds raised be earmarked for sports, and twenty percent for social welfare initiatives. Chen stated in December 2008 while discussing revisions to the Assembly and Parade Act that she preferred notice of a gathering be given to law enforcement on a voluntary basis. She expressed support for Chen Shui-bian in January 2009, while he was imprisoned on corruption charges. Later that month, Chen Chieh-ju described the Ministry of the Interior led by Liao Liou-yi as "the ministry of handing out money...carelessly" after it was reported that vouchers worth NT$11 million had been misplaced. By January 2009, Chen was highly ranked by the Citizen Congress Watch, a watchdog organization. In March, she pushed the Ma Ying-jeou administration to extend unemployment benefits to a full year. In April 2009, Chen coauthored an amendment to the Civil Code permitting divorce proceedings to begin via mediation. She later called for legal amendments permitting community members to report cases of child abuse, a responsibility otherwise delegated to police, teachers, medical personnel, and social workers. In September, Chen spoke out against the establishments of casinos in Penghu, disputing the county government's claim that launching a casino operation would help the local economy, providing 25,000 jobs and 5 million visitors annually.

In 2010, Chen proposed raising compensation for people who had died from the use of a H1N1 vaccine developed by Adimmune Corporation to NT$12 million, after the Centers for Disease Control had already announced a raise to NT$6 million from NT$2 million. She expressed reservations about a proposal by the Ministry of the Interior in October that sought to allow absentee voting in Taiwanese elections starting in 2012, believing that the plan had not done enough to ensure against the tampering of ballots. She praised the passage of amendments to the Social Assistance Act in December, stating that the revisions brought Taiwan in line with other regions in considering edibility of low-income households for government subsidies. In March 2011, Chen and fellow legislator Yu Jane-daw called on the Executive Yuan to suspend mayor Jason Hu after a fatal fire at ALA Pub in Taichung, which premier Wu Den-yih refused to do. In April, a month after the Fukushima Daiichi nuclear disaster had occurred, Chen derided the Red Cross Society of the Republic of China for its hesitation in offering aid, and the Atomic Energy Council for its technological ability to detect nuclear radiation. Near the end of her first term, Chen proposed an amendment to the Consumer Debt Clearance Act, which sought to simplify the process for debt settlement. She helped pass revisions to the Equalization of Land Rights Act, remarking "Transparency in the real-estate market is the most basic request of consumers" in support of the changes. Chen pushed for the status of people with HIV/AIDS to be registered at the Centers for Disease Control, opposing efforts to list that information directly on national health insurance cards. The Citizen Congress Watch again ranked Chen one of the best lawmakers at the end of her first term in office.

In June 2011, the Democratic Progressive Party finalized the list of legislative candidates contesting at large seats. Chen was ranked first for the second consecutive election cycle, and retained her seat on the Legislative Yuan. Shortly after her reelection in January 2012, Chen filed a lawsuit against Hu Wei-jen and Chang Ji-ping, accusing the pair of spying on DPP presidential candidate Tsai Ing-wen. Later that year, she objected to a levy raising premiums on national health insurance and criticized an amendment to the Medical Care Act protecting medical professionals from malpractice lawsuits. In 2013, Chen proposed a revision to the Nuclear Reactor Facilities Control Act mandating a local referendum be held wherever a new nuclear plant was to begin operation. She opposed a second bill intended to legalize gambling, this time on the outlying island of Matsu. Throughout the year, Chen reported on various medical issues, drawing attention to drugs that were manufactured with misleading authorizations, as well as long-term elder care. In 2014, she backed calls to help the elderly find adequate housing, eventually proposing related revisions to the Senior Citizens’ Welfare Act in 2015. That June, she helped revise the Income Tax Act, turning profits from housing sales into taxable income.

=== Political stances ===
As a lawmaker, Chen continued advocating for the rights of the disabled. In addition, Chen repeatedly denounced the use of excessive force by law enforcement personnel. She has attended multiple rallies commemorating the 1959 Tibetan uprising, and supported calls to extend right of residency to Tibetans married to Taiwanese nationals. In 2009, Chen opposed offering insurance to foreign elder caregivers, fearing that domestic caregivers would lose their jobs. She later rejected a 2011 appeal to extend the duration for which foreign caretakers are permitted to stay in Taiwan, favoring changes to legislation standardizing long-term care instead. In 2015, Chen submitted a motion to the Social Welfare and Environmental Hygiene Committee of the Legislative Yuan that would bar rich families from hiring foreign caretakers.

== Personal ==
Chen's son has developmental and physical disabilities.
