= Macular dystrophy =

Macular dystrophy may refer to any of these eye diseases:

- Macular corneal dystrophy, a rare pathological condition
- Macular degeneration, or age-related macular degeneration
- Vitelliform macular dystrophy, an irregular autosomal dominant eye disorder
