= Mark Li =

Taiwanese politician

Mark Li MLY
- 李明星
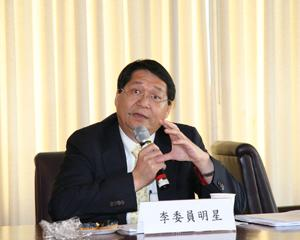
- Li in July 2010

Member of the Legislative Yuan
- In office 1 February 2008 – 31 January 2012
- Constituency: Republic of China

Personal details
- Party: Kuomintang
- Education: National Cheng Kung University (BS); Claremont Graduate University (MA)

Mark Li (Chinese: 李明星) is a Taiwanese politician. A member of the Kuomintang, he served in the Legislative Yuan from 2008 to 2012.

Li earned degrees from National Cheng Kung University and Claremont Graduate University. While studying in the United States, he obtained American citizenship.

Li was elected to the Legislative Yuan in 2008 via party list proportional representation.
