= Lee Fu-hsing =

Taiwanese politician

- 李復興

Member of the Legislative Yuan
- In office 1 February 2008 – 31 January 2012
- Succeeded by: Chao Tien-lin
- Constituency: Kaohsiung 4→Kaohsiung 7
- In office 1 February 2005 – 31 January 2008
- Succeeded by: Lin Yi-shih
- Constituency: Kaohsiung 2

Member of the Kaohsiung City Council
- In office 25 December 1990 – 31 January 2005
- Constituency: Kaohsiung 6th precinct

Personal details
- Born: 14 May 1946 (age 79) Kaohsiung County, Taiwan
- Party: Kuomintang
- Education: National Taichung University of Science and Technology; Tokyo University of Foreign Studies (BA); Tokyo Gakugei University (EdM); Kyushu University (PhD)

Lee Fu-hsing (Chinese: 李復興; born 14 May 1946) is a Taiwanese politician. He served on the Kaohsiung City Council between 1990 and 2005. He was a member of the Legislative Yuan from 2005 to 2012.

== Education ==
Lee attended the National Taichung University of Science and Technology, but received most of his post-secondary education in Japan. After graduating from the Tokyo University of Foreign Studies with a Bachelor of Arts (B.A.), he earned a Master of Education (Ed.M.) from Tokyo Gakugei University in 1985 and a Ph.D. in law from Kyushu University in 2004.

== Political career ==
Lee was first elected to the Kaohsiung City Council in 1989, winning reelection in 1993, 1997, and 2001. He ran for a seat on the Legislative Yuan in 2004, and won, stepping down from the city council in 2005 to enter the legislature. Lee registered his candidacy for the 2006 Kaohsiung mayoral election, but the Kuomintang eventually selected Huang Jun-ying as its candidate. Lee won reelection to the legislature in 2008 and left at the end of his second term in 2012.
