= Korea Biomedical Review =

South Korean English-language newspaper

- Format: Online
- Founded: February 22, 2017
- Language: English
- Headquarters: Seoul, Korea
- Sister newspapers: Korean Doctors' Weekly
- Website: koreabiomed.com

Korea Biomedical Review (Korean: 코리아 바이오메디칼 리뷰), abbreviated as KBR, is a South Korea-based online English-language newspaper that mainly delivers news related to the field of healthcare in South Korea.

Korea Biomedical Review is the first English newspaper in South Korea focusing on the healthcare field, and its ISO 4 abbreviation is Korea Biomed. Rev..

The newspaper's official website domain name, koreabiomed.com, was registered on October 7, 2016. The first issue of Korea Biomedical Review was released on 22 February 2017 as a sister paper to its Korean version, the Korean Doctors' Weekly.
