= Lee Yi-ting =

Taiwanese politician (1954/1955–2026)

- 李乙廷

Member of the Legislative Yuan
- In office 1 February 2008 – 10 December 2008
- Preceded by: Tu Wen-ching
- Succeeded by: Kang Shih-ju
- Constituency: Miaoli I

Personal details
- Born: 1954 or 1955
- Died: 20 February 2026 (aged 71)
- Party: Kuomintang
- Spouse: Chen Luan-ing

Lee Yi-ting (Chinese: 李乙廷; pinyin: Lǐ Yǐtíng; 1954 or 1955 – 20 February 2026) was a Taiwanese politician.

== Early life and education ==
Lee was raised in Houlong and attended National Taichung University of Science and Technology.

== Political career ==
Lee led several local agricultural organizations and worked for the Houlong Township Office before seeking election to the Legislative Yuan.

Both Lee and fellow Kuomintang member Kang Shih-ju planned to run in the January 2008 legislative elections, and the party chose to back Lee. He was elected to the Legislative Yuan in January 2008, defeating Democratic Progressive Party incumbent Tu Wen-ching. A few weeks after the election, the Miaoli District Prosecutors Office charged Lee with vote buying. The Taichung bench of the Taiwan High Court upheld the ruling of the Miaoli District Court in December, annulling Lee's electoral victory. By-elections were scheduled for 14 March 2009, and the Kuomintang named Lee's wife Chen Luan-ing as its candidate. She lost to Kang Shih-ju, a candidate who had left the KMT to plan an independent campaign.

In 2022, Lee served as acting mayor of Sanwan, succeeding Wen Chih-chiang.

== Death ==
Lee died on 20 February 2026, at the age of 71.
