= Wang To-far =

Taiwanese economist and politician

Wang To-far MLY
- 王塗發

Member of the Legislative Yuan
- In office 1 February 2005 – 31 January 2008
- Constituency: Republic of China

Personal details
- Born: 10 April 1948 (age 78)
- Party: Democratic Progressive Party
- Education: National Taipei University (BA); University of California, Santa Barbara (MA, PhD)
- Profession: Economist

Wang To-far (Chinese: 王塗發; born 10 April 1948) is a Taiwanese economist and politician.

== Career ==
Wang earned his bachelor's degree in economics in 1976 by attending night school at National Chung Hsing University's Taipei campus. He then pursued further study in the subject at the University of California, Santa Barbara, where he earned his master's degree in 1980 and his Ph.D. degree in 1983. Upon his return to Taiwan, Wang taught at his alma mater. He was a member of the Legislative Yuan from 2005 to 2008, and served on the legislature's Procedure Committee. Upon leaving the Legislative Yuan, Wang resumed teaching.

== Political stances ==
Wang is against use of nuclear power, and has backed legislation to reduce greenhouse gas emissions, as well as further investment in water management. In comments on the energy sector in Taiwan, Wang has pushed for the breakup of a monopoly belonging to the state-run Taiwan Power Company. He believes that setting quotas for the production of renewable energy is inefficient and insufficient.

Wang has called for the enforcement of regulations on the Cross-Strait economic relationship, opposing concentrated and continual investment in China without safeguards. He has advocated that the government support technological research and development. Wang himself is supportive of the 908 Taiwan Republic Campaign.

Wang has been critical of policies put forth by the Ma Ying-jeou presidential administration, many of which are against Wang's political positions. He said that a budget proposed by the Executive Yuan in 2009 would likely be used to invest in local political factions that would indirectly solicit votes for the Kuomintang at later dates instead. He strongly denounced the Economic Cooperation Framework Agreement, stating that the agreement was "a contract to sell out Taiwan" serving as "a short cut to political unification." In 2012, Wang described the Ma administration's Economic Power-up Plan as "complicated and nigh incomprehensible." The next year, Wang said of the Ma administration, "What we are facing is an evil, cold-blooded and shameless government" due to their support of the Lungmen Nuclear Power Plant project.
