= Kang Shih-ju =

Taiwanese politician

- 康世儒

Member of the Legislative Yuan
- In office 1 April 2009 – 31 January 2012
- Preceded by: Lee Yi-ting
- Succeeded by: Chen Chao-ming
- Constituency: Miaoli 1

Personal details
- Born: 16 January 1964 (age 62) Zhunan, Miaoli County, Taiwan
- Other political affiliations: Minkuotang (2015–2019); Independent (2009–2015); Kuomintang (until 2009)
- Education: Chin Min College (MBA)

Kang Shih-ju (Chinese: 康世儒; pinyin: Kāng Shìrú; born 16 January 1964) is a Taiwanese politician.

== Political career ==
Kang chose to run as an independent in the January 2008 legislative elections, after losing the Kuomintang nomination to Lee Yi-ting. After Lee was charged with electoral fraud, Kang defeated Lee's wife in a by-election held on 14 March 2009. He took office on 1 April, and joined the Non-Partisan Solidarity Union's legislative caucus. He ran for reelection in 2016, as a member of the Minkuotang, and lost.
