= Huang Sue-ying =

Taiwanese activist and politician

Huang Sue-ying MLY
- 黃淑英
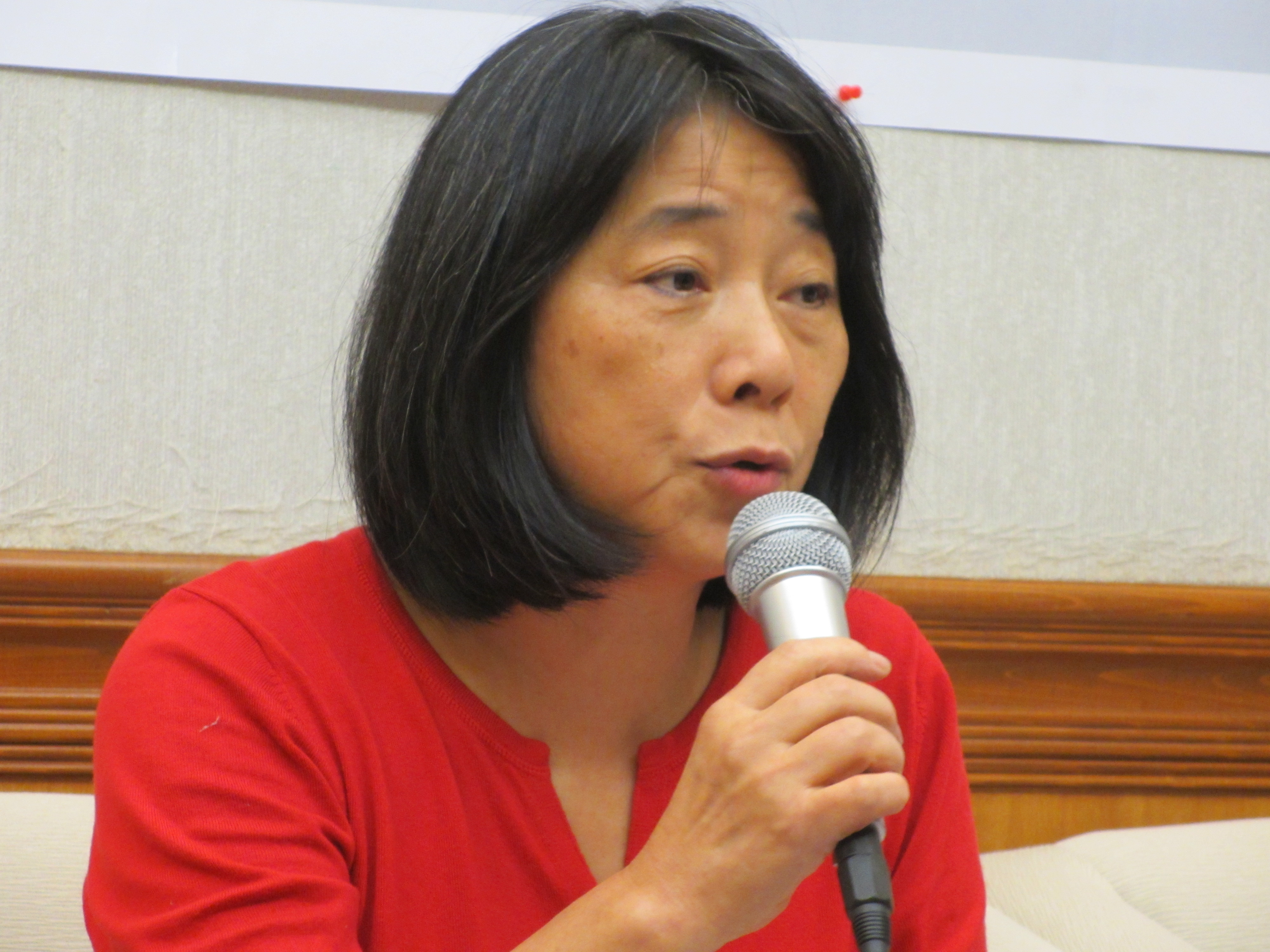
- Huang in September 2013

Member of the Legislative Yuan
- In office 1 February 2005 – 31 January 2012
- Constituency: Republic of China

Personal details
- Born: 12 April 1951 (age 75) Taipei, Taiwan
- Party: Democratic Progressive Party
- Education: Fu Jen Catholic University (BS); University of British Columbia (MS)

Huang Sue-ying (Chinese: 黃淑英; pinyin: Huáng Shúyīng; born 12 April 1951) is a Taiwanese activist and politician who served in the Legislative Yuan from 2005 to 2012.

== Education ==
Huang earned a bachelor's degree in biology from Fu Jen Catholic University and later earned a master's degree in animal science from the University of British Columbia.

== Career ==
Huang is the founding leader of Taiwan Women’s Link, a women's rights organization. She was elected to the Legislative Yuan in 2004 as a member of the Democratic Progressive Party via party list proportional representation. During her first term, Huang proposed an amendment to the Genetic Health Law introducing an insurance fund to help cover costs of abortion. She also helped draft an anti-discrimination law. In 2010, she co-sponsored the Act Governing Breastfeeding in Public Places, passed in November. The next year, Huang proposed changes to the Social Order Maintenance Act that would punish clients of sex workers, not sex workers themselves. Huang's amendment was rejected in November 2011. She also supported reform on labor standards to decrease the risk of overwork in the private security and medical industries. Huang ran for a third term in 2012, again on the party list, but was not reelected. Subsequently. Huang returned to the Taiwan Women's Link and also joined the National Health Insurance Civilian Surveillance Alliance.

Over the course of her legislative tenure, Huang was regarded by the Citizen's Congress Watch as a top legislator. She has been subject to multiple physical attacks by fellow lawmakers.

== Political stances ==
In August 2003, she expressed support for the Ministry of Education's After-school Child Care Initiative, which sought to provide government-funded after school programs for students. Huang opposed the 2004 reclassification of birth control pills as over-the-counter medication, believing that easy access to contraceptives would lead to a decrease in condom usage. She backed efforts to increase access to abortions, supporting a lowering of the age, from 20 to 18, when the operation could be legally considered.

As a legislator, Huang maintained an interest in healthcare. Huang was often critical of the Department of Health, speaking out against efforts to relax restrictions on United States beef imports to Taiwan and condemning the approval of medications with severe side effects. She has worked to uphold familial privacy regulations, and called for a subsidy given to married parents to be expanded to single mothers.

After leaving the Legislative Yuan, Huang has drawn attention to understaffed hospitals, and repeatedly called for Japan to apologize for the use of comfort women during World War II. Huang criticized the addition of supplementary premiums to National Health Insurance. She has derided a voluntary certification program meant for aesthetic medical facilities as ineffective. Huang is strongly opposed to the use of assisted reproductive technology, in particular the legalization of surrogacy, describing the practice, as "slighting others' risks and rights just to fulfill the needs of some." She has also commented on the economic inequality within the process, stating, "A woman’s body is not a commodity or a tool. We oppose rich people exploiting poor women and buying them as surrogate mothers."
