= Chen Chieh-ju (born 1937) =

Taiwanese politician (born 1937)

Chen Chieh-ju MLY
- 陳傑儒
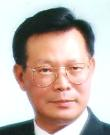

Member of the Legislative Yuan
- In office 1 February 1999 – 31 January 2002
- Constituency: Republic of China
- In office 1 February 1993 – 31 January 1999
- Constituency: Taichung County

Personal details
- Born: 25 November 1937 (age 88) Taichū Prefecture, Taiwan, Empire of Japan
- Party: Non-Partisan Solidarity Union (since 2004)
- Other political affiliations: Kuomintang (until 2004)
- Education: National Cheng Kung University (BA)

Chen Chieh-ju (Chinese: 陳傑儒; pinyin: Chén Jiérú; born 25 November 1937) is a Taiwanese politician.

== Education ==
Chen attended primary and secondary school in his native Taichung and later studied at National Cheng Kung University.

== Political career ==
Chen served three terms on the Taichung County Council before running for a seat on the Legislative Yuan in 1992. He won reelection in 1995 and 1998. He joined the Non-Partisan Solidarity Union in 2004 as the newly founded political party's secretary-general. Chen supported Ma Ying-jeou in the 2012 presidential election.
