= 10th Legislative Yuan =

Session of the Legislative Yuan of Taiwan

←	9th	11th	→

Overview
- Legislative body: Legislative Yuan
- Jurisdiction: Taiwan
- Meeting place: Legislative Yuan Building
- Term: 1 February 2020 – 31 January 2024
- Election: 2020 Taiwanese legislative election
- Government: Second Executive Yuan of Su Tseng-chang; Executive Yuan of Chen Chien-jen
- Members: 113

Seat composition for the 10th Legislative Yuan before changes DPP (61) KMT (38) TPP (5) NPP (3) TSP (1) Independent (KMT Caucus) (1) Independent (DPP Caucus) (2) Independent (2)

The 10th Legislative Yuan was a term of members of the Legislative Yuan of Taiwan, from 1 February 2020 to 31 January 2024. Members were elected in the 2020 legislative election, in which the Democratic Progressive Party (DPP) retained majority status as did pan-green parties. The next legislative election, to decide the members of the 11th Legislative Yuan, took place on 13 January 2024.

== Single-member constituency ==
Constituency		Legislator	Party
Taipei City	I	Wu Szu-yao	Democratic Progressive Party
Taipei City	II	Ho Chih-wei	Democratic Progressive Party
Taipei City	III	Wang Hung-wei	Kuomintang
Taipei City	IV	Kao Chia-yu	Democratic Progressive Party
Taipei City	V	Lim Tshiong-tso	Democratic Progressive Party
Taipei City	VI	Vacant	
Taipei City	VII	Fai Hrong-tai	Kuomintang
Taipei City	VIII	Lai Shyh-bao	Kuomintang
New Taipei City	I	Hung Mong-kai	Kuomintang
New Taipei City	II	Lin Shu-fen	Democratic Progressive Party
New Taipei City	III	Yu Tien	Democratic Progressive Party
New Taipei City	IV	Wu Ping-jui	Democratic Progressive Party
New Taipei City	V	Su Chiao-hui	Democratic Progressive Party
New Taipei City	VI	Chang Hung-lu	Democratic Progressive Party
New Taipei City	VII	Lo Chih-cheng	Democratic Progressive Party
New Taipei City	VIII	Chiang Yung-chang	Democratic Progressive Party
New Taipei City	IX	Lin Te-fu	Kuomintang
New Taipei City	X	Wu Chi-ming	Democratic Progressive Party
New Taipei City	XI	Lo Ming-tsai	Kuomintang
New Taipei City	XII	Lai Pin-yu	Democratic Progressive Party
Taoyuan City	I	Cheng Yun-peng	Democratic Progressive Party
Taoyuan City	II	Huang Shih-chieh	Democratic Progressive Party
Taoyuan City	III	Lu Ming-che	Kuomintang
Taoyuan City	IV	Wan Mei-ling	Kuomintang
Taoyuan City	V	Lu Yu-ling	Kuomintang
Taoyuan City	VI	Chao Cheng-yu	Independent (Caucuses with DPP)
Taichung City	I	Tsai Chi-chang	Democratic Progressive Party
Taichung City	II	Lin Ching-yi	Democratic Progressive Party
Taichung City	III	Yang Chiung-ying	Kuomintang
Taichung City	IV	Chang Liao Wan-chien	Democratic Progressive Party
Taichung City	V	Chuang Ching-cheng	Democratic Progressive Party
Taichung City	VI	Huang Kuo-shu	Independent (Note: Huang was elected as a member of the DPP, but he resigned from the party in October 2021 after reports surfaced that he worked as a Kuomintang informant in his 20s.)
Taichung City	VII	Ho Hsin-chun	Democratic Progressive Party
Taichung City	VIII	Chiang Chi-chen	Kuomintang
Tainan City	I	Lai Hui-yuan	Democratic Progressive Party
Tainan City	II	Kuo Kuo-wen	Democratic Progressive Party
Tainan City	III	Chen Ting-fei	Democratic Progressive Party
Tainan City	IV	Lin I-chin	Democratic Progressive Party
Tainan City	V	Lin Chun-hsien	Democratic Progressive Party
Tainan City	VI	Wang Ting-yu	Democratic Progressive Party
Kaohsiung City	I	Chiu Yi-ying	Democratic Progressive Party
Kaohsiung City	II	Chiu Chih-wei	Democratic Progressive Party
Kaohsiung City	III	Liu Shyh-fang	Democratic Progressive Party
Kaohsiung City	IV	Lin Tai-hua	Democratic Progressive Party
Kaohsiung City	V	Lee Kun-tse	Democratic Progressive Party
Kaohsiung City	VI	Chao Tien-lin	Democratic Progressive Party
Kaohsiung City	VII	Hsu Chih-chieh	Democratic Progressive Party
Kaohsiung City	VIII	Lai Jui-lung	Democratic Progressive Party
Yilan County		Chen Ou-po	Democratic Progressive Party
Hsinchu County	I	Lin Wei-chou	Kuomintang
Hsinchu County	II	Lin Szu-ming	Kuomintang
Miaoli County	I	Chen Chao-ming	Kuomintang
Miaoli County	II	Hsu Chih-jung	Kuomintang
Changhua County	I	Chen Hsiu-pao	Democratic Progressive Party
Changhua County	II	Huang Hsiu-fang	Democratic Progressive Party
Changhua County	III	Hsieh Yi-fong	Kuomintang
Changhua County	IV	Chen Su-yueh	Democratic Progressive Party
Nantou County	I	Ma Wen-chun	Kuomintang
Nantou County	II	Tsai Pei-hui	Democratic Progressive Party (Note: Tsai Pei-hui elected on 2023 special election after Hsu Shu-hua left for Nantou magistracy post.)
Yunlin County	I	Su Chih-fen	Democratic Progressive Party
Yunlin County	II	Liu Chien-kuo	Democratic Progressive Party
Chiayi County	I	Tsai Yi-yu	Democratic Progressive Party
Chiayi County	II	Chen Ming-wen	Democratic Progressive Party
Pingtung County	I	Chung Chia-pin	Democratic Progressive Party
Pingtung County	II	Su Chen-ching	Independent (Caucuses with DPP) (Note: Su originally held DPP membership, but ran as an independent in the election. DPP supported Su by not fielding its own candidate. In February 2021, Su temporarily resigned from the DPP amidst a bribery allegation.)
Hualien County		Fu Kun-chi	Kuomintang
Taitung County		Liu Chao-hao	Independent (Note: Expelled by DPP after defeat in primary.)
Penghu County		Yang Yao	Democratic Progressive Party
Keelung City		Tsai Shih-ying	Democratic Progressive Party
Hsinchu City		Cheng Cheng-chien	Kuomintang
Chiayi City		Wang Mei-hui	Democratic Progressive Party
Kinmen County		Chen Yu-jen	Kuomintang
Lienchiang County		Chen Hsueh-sheng	Kuomintang
Lowland Indigenous Peoples		Jeng Tian-tsair (Sra Kacaw)	Kuomintang
Lowland Indigenous Peoples		Liao Kuo-tung (Sufin Siluko)	Kuomintang
Lowland Indigenous Peoples		Chen Ying (Asenay Daliyalrep)	Democratic Progressive Party
Highland Indigenous Peoples		Kao Chin Su-mei (Ciwas Ali)	Independent (Caucuses with KMT) (Note: Kao Chin Su-mei ran as an independent in the election, but she is affiliated with the NPSU).
Highland Indigenous Peoples		Wu Li-hua (Saidhai Tahovecahe)	Democratic Progressive Party
Highland Indigenous Peoples		Kung Wen-chi (Yosi Takun)	Kuomintang

== Party-list Proportional Representation ==
No.	Name	Party
1	Wu Yu-chin	Democratic Progressive Party
2	Hung Sun-han	Democratic Progressive Party
3	Fan Yun	Democratic Progressive Party
4	Lo Mei-ling	Democratic Progressive Party
5	Chiu Tai-yuan	Democratic Progressive Party
~~6~~	~~Chou Chun-mi~~	~~Democratic Progressive Party~~ (Note: Chou Chun-mi was elected Pingtung County Magistrate and replaced by Chen Ching-min)
7	Yu Shyi-kun	Democratic Progressive Party
8	Ker Chien-ming	Democratic Progressive Party
~~9~~	~~Kuan Bi-ling~~	~~Democratic Progressive Party~~ (Note: Kuan Bi-ling was inaugurated as Chairperson of Ocean Affairs Council and replaced by Chen Pei-yu)
10	Chuang Jui-hsiung	Democratic Progressive Party
11	Shen Fa-hui	Democratic Progressive Party
12	Michelle Lin	Democratic Progressive Party
16	Tang Hui-jen	Democratic Progressive Party
17	Chen Ching-min	Democratic Progressive Party (Note: Chen Ching-min replaced Chou Chun-mi on the party list upon Chou's inauguration as Pingtung County Magistrate)
22	Chen Pei-yu	Democratic Progressive Party (Note: Chen Pei-yu replaced Kuan Bi-ling on the party list upon Chou's inauguration as Chairperson of Ocean Affairs Council)
No.	Name	Party
1	Tseng Ming-chung	Kuomintang
2	Yeh Yu-lan	Kuomintang
3	Li Gui-min	Kuomintang
4	Wu Sz-huai	Kuomintang
5	Cheng Li-wun	Kuomintang
6	Lin Wen-jui	Kuomintang
7	Liao Wan-ju	Kuomintang
8	Wong Chung-chun	Kuomintang
9	Wu I-ding	Kuomintang
10	Chen I-hsin	Kuomintang
11	Chang Yu-mei	Kuomintang
12	Lee De-wei	Kuomintang
13	Wen Yu-hsia	Kuomintang
No.	Name	Party
1	Lai Hsiang-lin	Taiwan People's Party
2	Jang Chyi-lu	Taiwan People's Party
~~3~~	~~Ann Kao~~	~~Taiwan People's Party~~ (Note: Ann Kao was elected Mayor of Hsinchu and replaced by Chen Wan-hui)
4	Andy Chiu	Taiwan People's Party
~~5~~	~~Tsai Pi-ru~~	~~Taiwan People's Party~~ (Note: Tsai Pi-ru resigned her legislative seat on 14 October 2022, and was replaced by Cynthia Wu)
7	Cynthia Wu	Taiwan People's Party (Note: Cynthia Wu replaced Tsai Pi-ru on the party list upon Tsai's resignation)
9	Chen Wan-hui	Taiwan People's Party (Note: Chen Wan-hui replaced Ann Kao upon Kao's inauguration as Mayor of Hsinchu)
No.	Name	Party
1	Chen Jiau-hua	New Power Party
2	Chiu Hsien-chih	New Power Party
3	Wang Wan-yu	New Power Party
