= 2022 Taiwan Railway Union collective leave action =

Labor dispute in Taiwan

2022 Taiwan Railway Union Collective Leave Action
- Date: 1 May 2022
- Location: Taiwan
- Caused by: The Ministry of Transportation and Communications proposed legislation to accelerate the corporatization of the Taiwan Railways Administration without fully consulting the Taiwan Railway Union. Union members argued that the bill failed to address concerns regarding railway safety.
- Methods: Collective leave

Parties
Taiwan Railway Union; Taiwan Railway Labor Union	Ministry of Transportation and Communications; Taiwan Railways Administration

Lead figures
Chen Shih-chieh, Chairman of the Taiwan Railway Union; Wang Chieh, Chairman of the Taiwan Railway Labor Union	Wang Kwo-tsai, Minister of Transportation and Communications; Du Wei, Director-General of the Taiwan Railways Administration

The 2022 Taiwan Railway Union collective leave action refers to the collective leave taken by members of theTaiwan Railway Labor Union on 1 May 2022 (International Workers' Day). The action was organized in protest against the Ministry of Transportation and Communications' push to corporatize the Taiwan Railways Administration (TRA) without prior consultation. Employees exercised their rights under the Labor Standards Actby collectively taking leave.

== Background ==
On 2 April 2021, TRA Train No. 408, a Taroko Express, collided with a construction vehicle that had slid down a slope near Qingshui Tunnel in Xiulin Township, Hualien County, killing 49 people. Following two major accidents within three years, calls for reform of the Taiwan Railways Administration intensified. Before the leave action, Taiwan, Cuba, Myanmar, and North Korea were the only places in the world where railway operations remained entirely under a government civil service system. To respond to demands for reform, the Executive Yuan meeting approved a draft Act for the Establishment of Taiwan Railway Corporation, Limited shortly before the first anniversary of the accident, initiating the process of corporatization.

However, the Executive Yuan's draft did not include provisions regarding fare adjustment mechanisms or railway safety regulations, leaving unresolved the long-standing problem of losses caused by low ticket prices. TRA employees questioned whether the bill would improve safety or provide a vision for financial sustainability.

== Incident ==
During negotiations on 15 April 2022, Wang Kwo-tsai,Minister of Transportation and Communications of the Republic of China maintained his position and opposed returning the draft Taiwan Railway Corporation Act for further negotiations, causing talks to break down. On 17 April, the TRA suspended ticket reservations for 1 May through its website. This marked the second complete suspension of TRA services not caused by natural disasters such as typhoons since the first railway strike on 1 May 1988, thirty-four years earlier.

On 21 April, Wang held a press conference announcing that all scheduled trains on 1 May would be suspended and unveiled transportation contingency plans. Working together with the TRA, the Directorate General of the Highway Bureau, and the Taiwan High Speed Rail Corporation, authorities sought to compensate for the expected loss of approximately 358,000 passenger trips and introduced the concept of "Rail replacement bus service" to avoid a repeat of the disruption caused by the 1988 strike.

A total of twelve "quasi-train" bus routes were arranged for 1 May, including six in western Taiwan, three in eastern Taiwan, and three on the South Link line. The buses stopped at thirty-six stations and operated 716 services, providing 28,640 seats. Tickets were sold at stations, where the substitute buses stopped, or through a smart Card, with fares charged according to local train rates.

On 24 April, the TRA website published an open letter of apology from Director-General Du Wei (born 1960), which stated:

We sincerely apologize for the suspension of all scheduled train services on Labor Day (1 May 2022), which prevented us from providing the transportation services passengers deserve. On behalf of the entire administration, I express my deepest apologies to travelers and the public. Passengers who cancel their trips may obtain a full refund within one year by presenting unused tickets, including round-trip tickets, at any station without any handling fee. We again apologize for the inconvenience caused.

Du also advised the public to cancel travel plans or use alternative means of transportation. As a result of the "May Day no-overtime action", tourist trains and theBlue Skin Express were suspended, although the Future Express had not originally been scheduled to operate that day and was unaffected. After reviewing available train crews, the TRA announced on 30 April that twelve local train services and six express local train services would be operated on an ad hoc basis on 1 May.

On 1 May, the Taiwan Railway Labor Union joined the action and organized a march, appealing to President of the Republic of China Tsai Ing-wen, who also served as chair of the chairperson of the Democratic Progressive Party with the slogan: "Grassroots participation in safety reform—President, please hear the voices of railway workers." The union criticized the Ministry of Transportation and Communications and the TRA for ignoring the concerns of frontline workers and proposed six demands: safety reform, better compensation, equal pay for equal work, improved labor conditions, sustainable management, and industrial democracy. Wang Chieh, a Taipei Station employee and chairman of the Taiwan Railway Labor Union, argued that the Ministry of Transportation and the Railway Bureau effectively supervised themselves and that even experts on the Taiwan Transportation Safety Board had close ties with the ministry, making genuine external oversight impossible.

On 5 May, the TRA responded to five questions raised by the Taiwan Railway Union regarding corporatization. As negotiations failed to reach a consensus, the union stated that further legal leave actions remained possible. However, it also indicated that any existing overtime refusal campaign would be canceled if an agreement could be reached.

On 25 May, the union held a meeting to discuss a similar action during the Dragon Boat Festival but decided to cancel the plan after determining that communications with the ministry had improved.

On 27 May, the Legislative Yuan passed the Act for the Establishment of Taiwan Railway Corporation, Limited in its third reading, consisting of twenty-three articles.

On 2 August, dissatisfied with what it viewed as perfunctory negotiations over corporatization, the Taiwan Railway Union's board voted to initiate strike procedures. Besides planning overtime refusal actions during the Mid-Autumn Festival, National Day, and local elections, it also began the formal legal process for a strike. However, after the Executive Yuan made concessions, the action was canceled on 24 August.

== Related compensation measures ==
During negotiations on 27 April 2022, Minister of Education Pan Wen-chung noted that 1 May coincided with the second day of the Four-Year Technical and Two-Year Junior College Unified Entrance Examination. He stated that if examinees lacked alternative transportation and needed to use chartered Tour bus service or taxis, the Ministry of Education would assist with the associated costs.

== Reactions ==
=== Legislators ===
Kuomintang legislator Fu Kun-chi stated that although the Ministry of Transportation and Communications had good intentions, the feasibility of the "quasi-train" system was questionable. Fu and fellow KMT legislator Hung Mong-kai argued that concentrating traffic on Provincial Highway 9 would only worsen congestion.

Independent politician legislator Kao Chin Su-mei pointed out that while railway workers were legally entitled to take leave on Labor Day, Wang Kwo-tsai had asked long-distance bus drivers to work overtime to compensate for the transportation shortage, criticizing the government for relying on short-term measures instead of addressing the underlying problems.

Taiwan People's Party legislator Jang Chyi-lu argued that forcing railway passengers to wait for buses operating only a few times a day or to rely on taxis represented an inadequate solution.

== Photos ==
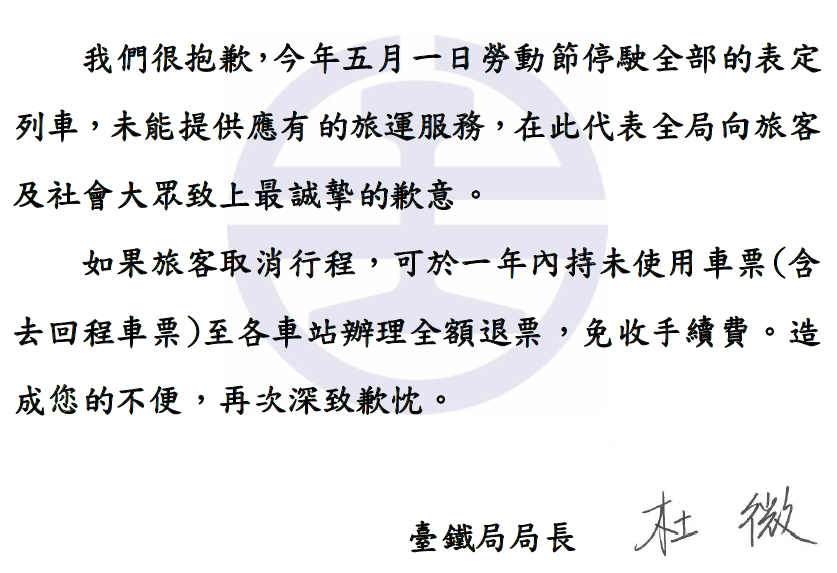
The announcement regarding the suspension of services on Labor Day, posted on the Taiwan Railways official website.

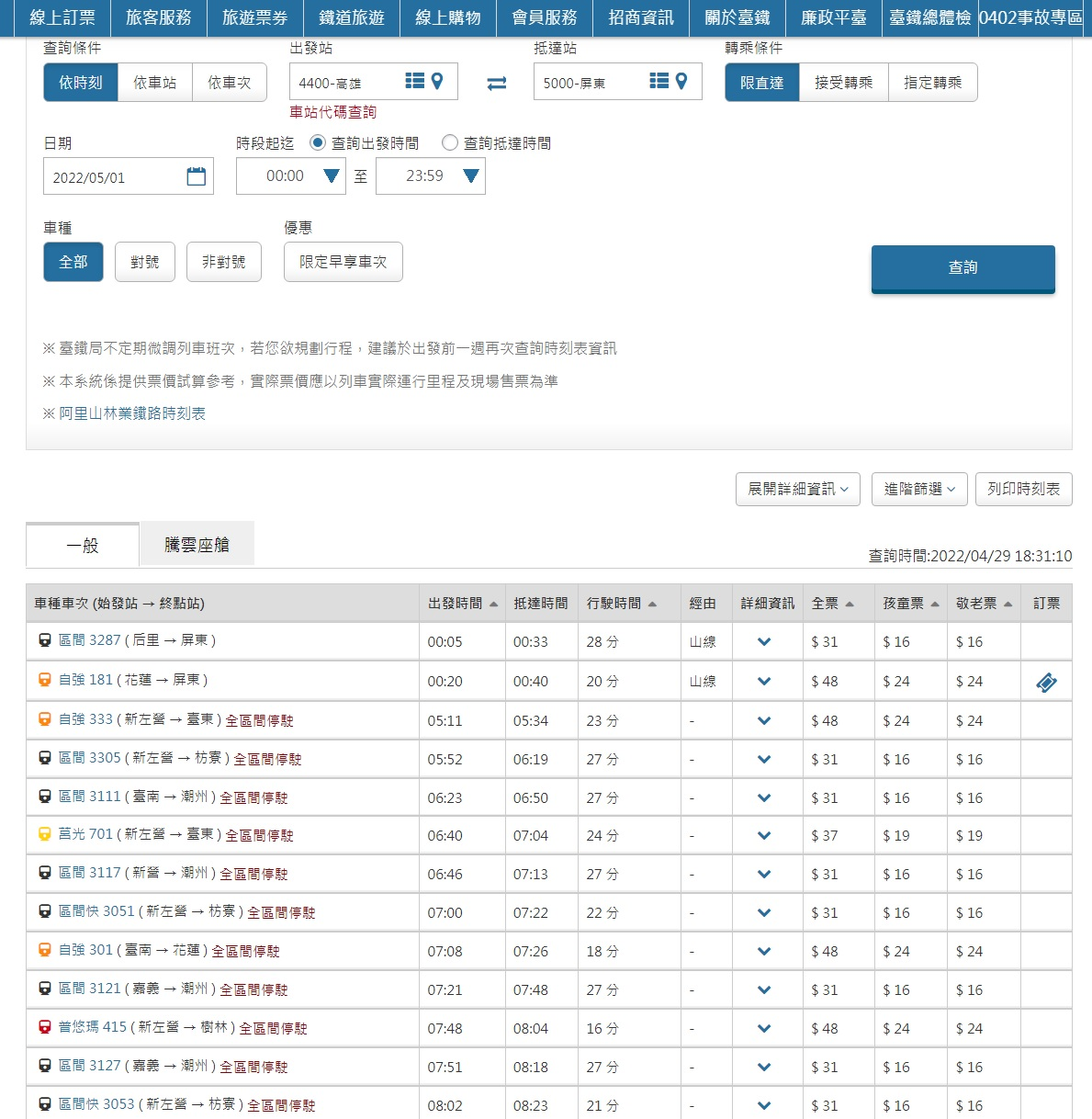
Passenger train timetable from Kaohsiung Station to Pingtung Station, as shown in the Taiwan Railways Administration's schedule and train number inquiry system for May 1, 2022. With the exception of services that began on the previous day (April 30, 2022) and continued into the day in question, all other scheduled services were listed as "suspended across the entire route."

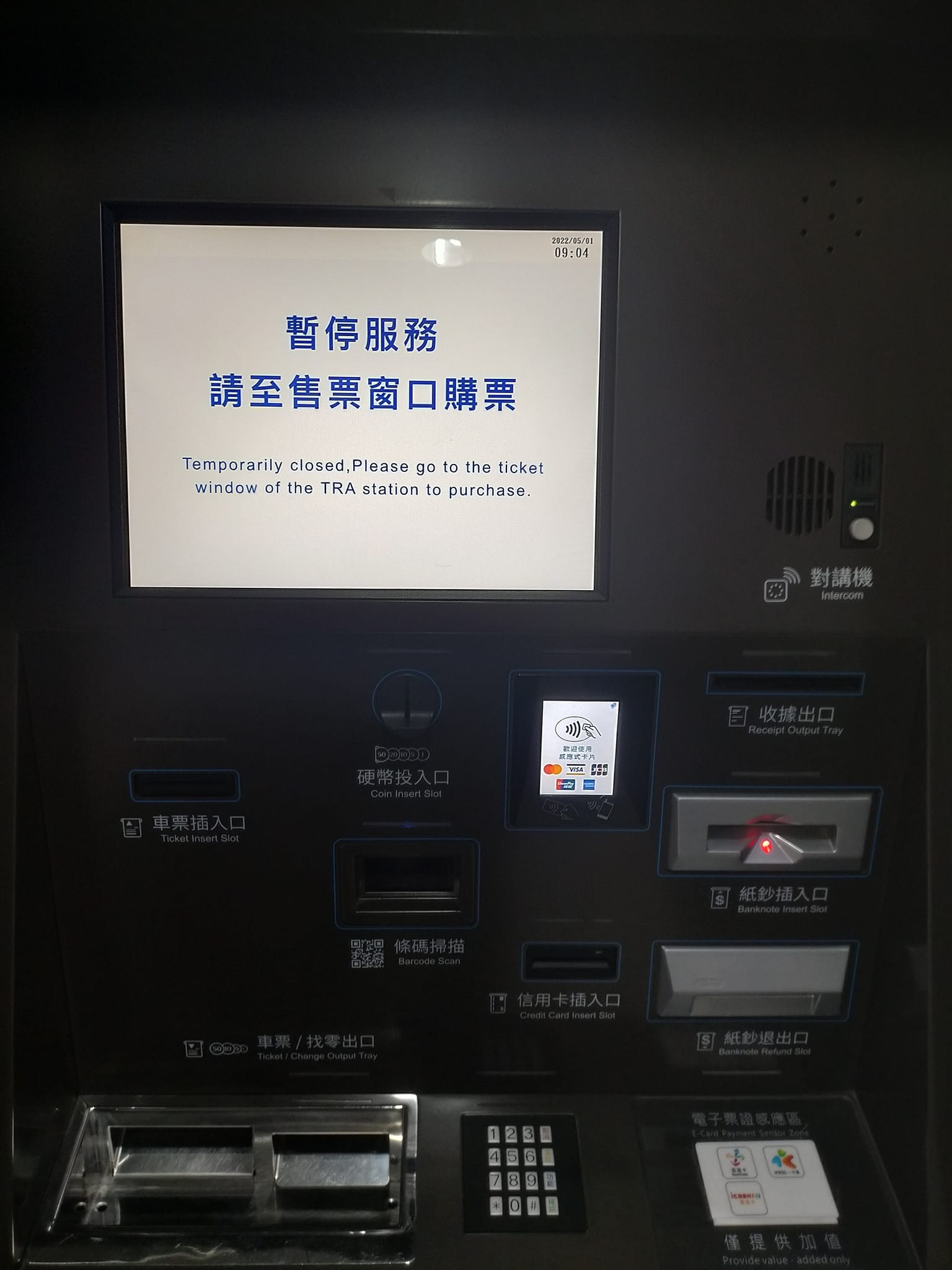
20On May 1, 2022, the ticket vending machines in the concourse of Pingtung Station (Taiwan Railways Administration) suspended service due to the Taiwan Railway Labor Union's lawful collective leave.

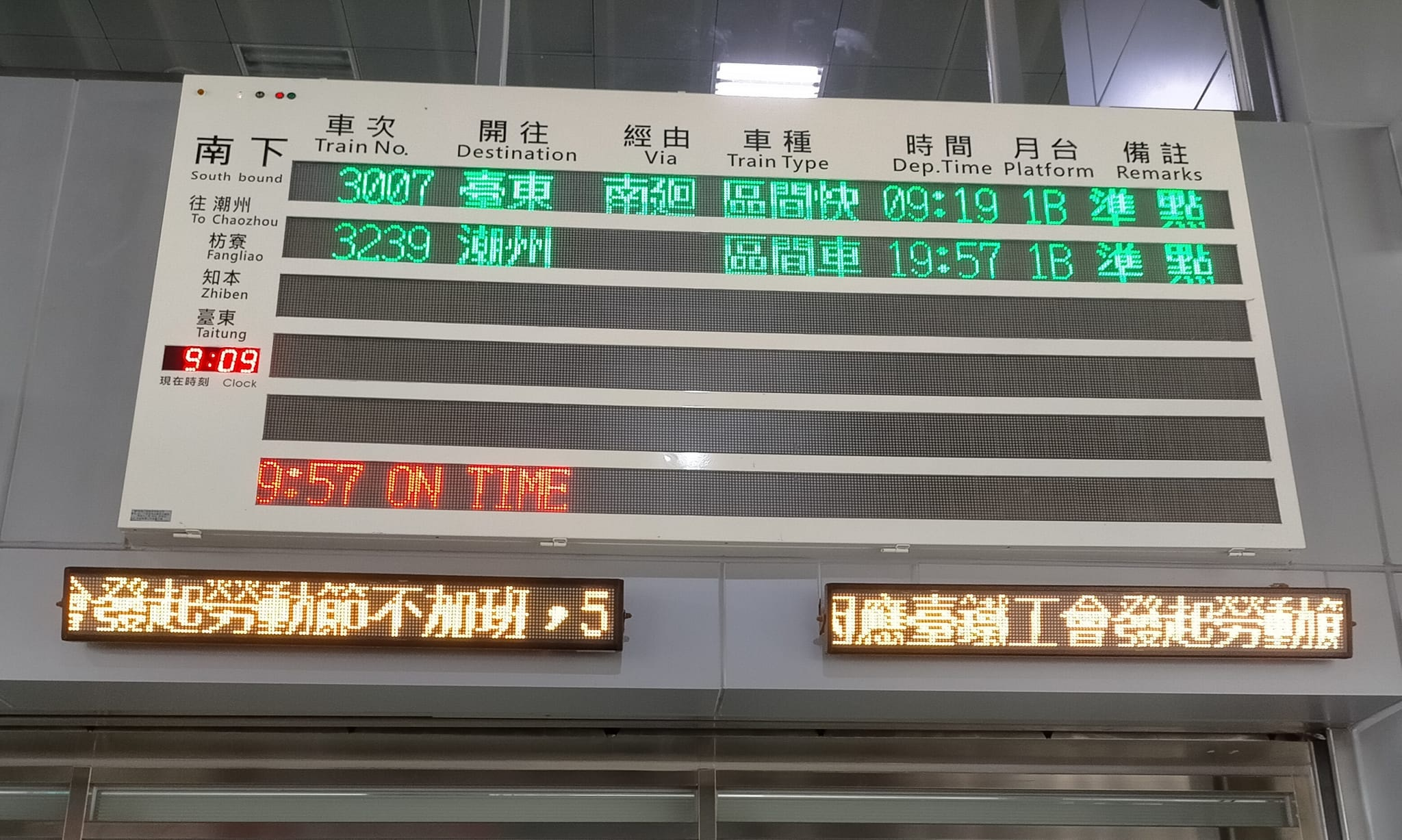
This is the passenger train timetable for the concourse of Pingtung Station (Taiwan Railways Administration) on May 1, 2022; due to the Taiwan Railway Labor Union exercising its right to take leave in accordance with the law, train services were severely limited and consisted entirely of special, unscheduled runs.

== Others ==
Although all scheduled train services were suspended on 1 May, the TRA noted that passengers using the Taiwan High Speed Rail would still purchase Taiwan Railway Bento. As a result, twelve outlets continued to sell the famous railway boxed meals, with the Taipei Main Station outlet selling out within an hour.

Former Taipei Station master Tsou Chin-sung remarked that the events of Labor Day 2022 reminded him of the nationwide TRA strike of 1 May 1988, which had attracted worldwide attention, and said that he was fortunate to witness another historic moment during his lifetime.
