= Lin Kun-han =

Taiwanese baseball player and politician

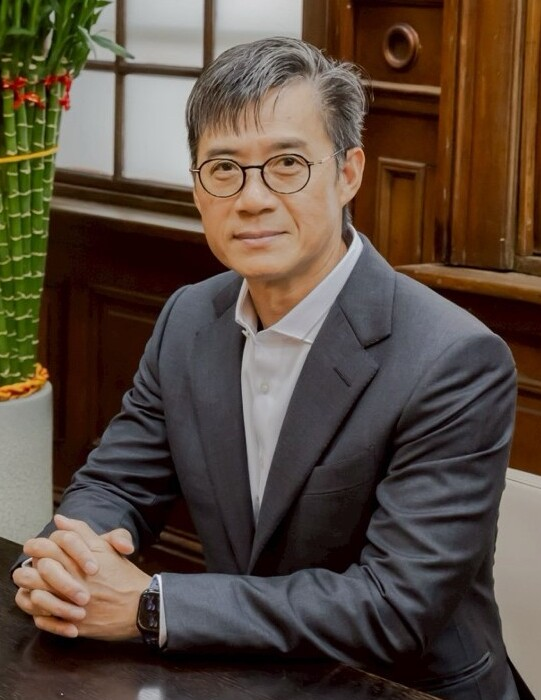
- Official portrait, 2026

9th Deputy Mayor of Hsinchu
- Incumbent
- Assumed office 10 March 2026
- Mayor: Ann Kao
- Preceded by: Andy Chiu

Baseball career
- Infielder
- Born: 5 January 1968 (age 58); Changhua County, Taiwan
- Batted: Right Threw: Right

Professional debut
- CPBL: March 16, 1994, for the Mercuries Tigers
- TML: 1999, for the Taipei Gida

Last appearance
- CPBL: October 24, 1998, for the Mercuries Tigers
- TML: 2002, for the Taipei Gida

CPBL statistics
- Batting average: .261
- Home runs: 19
- Runs batted in: 180

TML statistics
- Batting average: .321
- Home runs: 16
- Runs batted in: 158
- Stats at Baseball Reference

Teams
- As player: Mercuries Tigers (1994–1998); Taipei Gida (1999–2002); As coach: Taipei Gida (2002)

Career highlights and awards
- 2x CPBL All-Star (1997–1998); 2x TML All-Star (1999–2000); CPBL Gold Glove (1998); 3x TML Gold Glove (1999–2001); 3x TML Best Nine (1999–2000, 2002); TML Championship Series Champions (2000)
Medals
Representing Chinese Taipei
Men's baseball
Olympic Games
Silver medal – second place	1992 Barcelona	Team
Asian Games
Bronze medal – third place	1998 Bangkok	Team
Asian Championship
Silver medal – second place	1991 China	Team
Bronze medal – third place	1993 Australia	Team
World Junior Baseball Championship
Silver medal – second place	1986 Windsor	Team

Lin Kun-han (Chinese: 林琨瀚; pinyin: Lín Kūnhàn; Wade–Giles: Lin^{2} Kun^{1} Han^{4}; born 5 January 1968), is a Taiwanese baseball player and politician who competed in the 1992 Summer Olympics. He served as the deputy mayor of the Hsinchu City since March 2026.

He was part of the Chinese Taipei baseball team which won the silver medal. He played as infielder.
