= Lo Mei-ling =

Taiwanese politician

Loh Meei-ling MLY
- 羅美玲
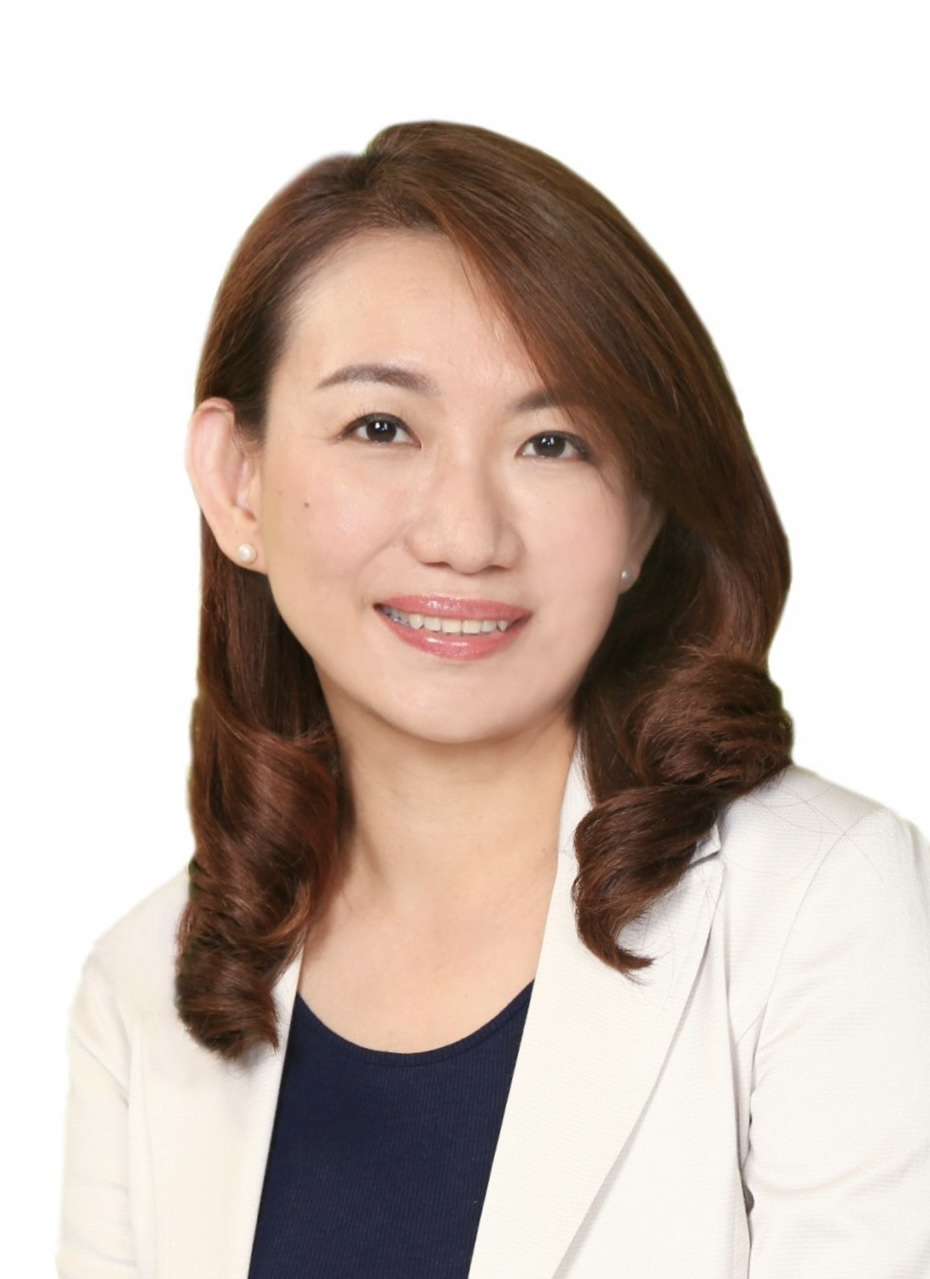
- Official portrait, 2024

Member of the Legislative Yuan
- Incumbent
- Assumed office 1 February 2020
- Constituency: Party-list

Personal details
- Born: 1 May 1969 (age 57) Malacca, Malaysia
- Party: Democratic Progressive Party (since 2018); Independent (2014–2018)
- Education: National Taiwan Normal University (BA); Providence University (MBA); National Changhua University of Education (PhD)
- Profession: Educator

Loh Meei-ling (Chinese: 羅美玲; pinyin: Luó Měilíng; born 1 May 1969) is a Malaysian-born Taiwanese politician and educator. She was a member of the Nantou County Council from 2014 to 2020, when she was elected to the 10th Legislative Yuan. Lo followed Lin Li-chan as the second immigrant to Taiwan to serve as a member of the Legislative Yuan.

== Early life and education ==
Lo was born in Malaysia on 1 May 1969. She attended Pay Fong Middle School before immigrating to Taiwan in 1987 to study geography at National Taiwan Normal University, where she graduated with a Bachelor of Arts in the subject. Lo then earned a Master of Business Administration (M.B.A.) from Providence University and a Ph.D. in finance from the National Changhua University of Education. Her doctoral dissertation was titled, "A study of biases in cross-strait primary school textbooks: Taiwan and mainland China" (Chinese: 兩岸小學語文教科書之世界觀研究). She acquired Taiwanese citizenship through marriage to a Taiwanese national.

== Political career ==
Lo was elected to the Nantou County Council for the first time in 2014, as a political independent. She joined the Democratic Progressive Party for the 2018 election cycle, and was reelected. As a member of the county council, she advocated for the elderly living in low-income households. In November 2019, she was ranked fourth on the DPP party list, and won election to the 10th Legislative Yuan via proportional representation.

In May 2020, Lo advocated for stricter laws on fire safety. In November of that year, she founded a coalition to offer support for immigrants to Taiwan. In March 2021, Lo proposed that rescue services operate on a user-pay principle to dissuade unprepared tourists from visiting mountainous areas. In August 2021, she drew attention to suicide rates among adolescents, and advised that the Ministry of Education employ more guidance counselors as part of its suicide prevention efforts. That same month, she held a joint press conference regarding animal welfare and living conditions at pet shops and breeders. In October 2021, Lo proposed a basic law regarding the low birth rate in Taiwan. She continued advocating for children, expressing concern in the following month that the internet made minors more susceptible to sexual exploitation and abuse. In March 2022, Lo suggested that Article 31 of the Laws and Regulations Regarding Hong Kong & Macau Affairs be amended to prevent Chinese companies from claiming foreign or Hong Kong funding while doing business in Taiwan. During the 2022 Taiwanese local elections, she led the DPP campaign messaging efforts targeting immigrants and naturalized citizens.

Lo was the fifth candidate listed on the DPP party list for the 2024 legislative election cycle. In the 11th Legislative Yuan, Lo established the Taiwan-Malaysia Inter-Parliamentary Amity Group and an association advocating for the rights of new immigrants to Taiwan.
