= 暨南大學 =

暨南大學 may refer to:

- Jinan University (Chinese: 暨南大学), a university in Guangzhou, China
- National Chi Nan University, (Chinese: 國立暨南國際大學), a university in Nantou, Taiwan
