= Ann Kao =

Taiwanese politician and engineer

Kao Hung-an MLY
- 高虹安
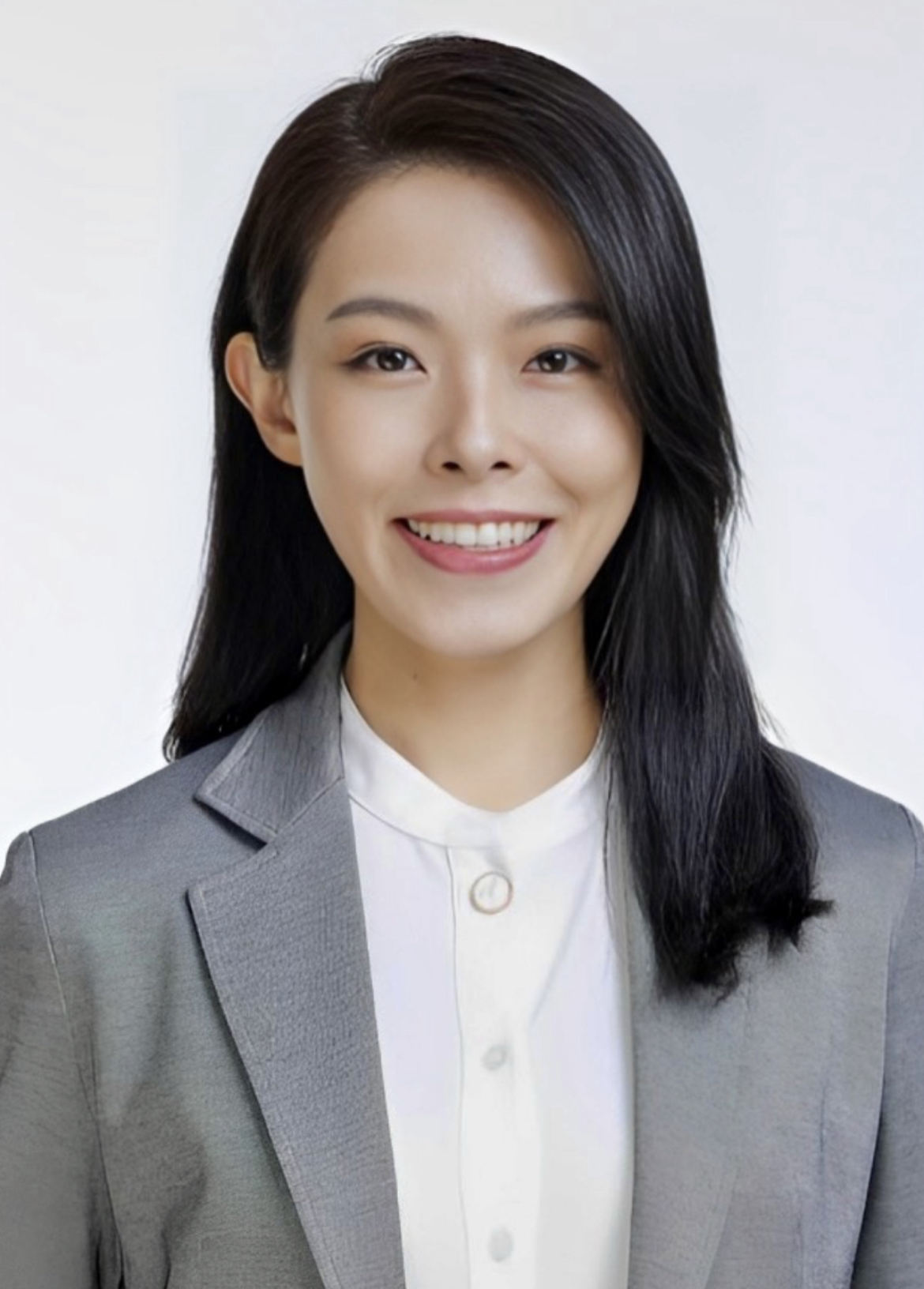
- Official portrait, 2022

8th Mayor of Hsinchu
- Incumbent
- Assumed office 25 December 2022; Suspended from 24 July 2024 to 18 December 2025
- Deputy: Tsai Li-tsing; Andy Chiu
- Preceded by: Chen Chang-hsien (acting); Lin Chih-chien

Member of the Legislative Yuan
- In office 1 February 2020 – 25 December 2022
- Succeeded by: Chen Wan-hui
- Constituency: Party-list (Taiwan People's Party)

Personal details
- Born: 25 January 1984 (age 42) Neihu, Taipei, Taiwan
- Party: Independent
- Other political affiliations: Taiwan People's Party (2019–2024)
- Education: National Taiwan Normal University (BS); National Taiwan University (MS); University of Cincinnati (PhD)
- Scientific career
- Fields: Mechanical engineering
- Thesis: Quality prediction modeling for multistage manufacturing using classification and association rule mining techniques (2018)

Signature
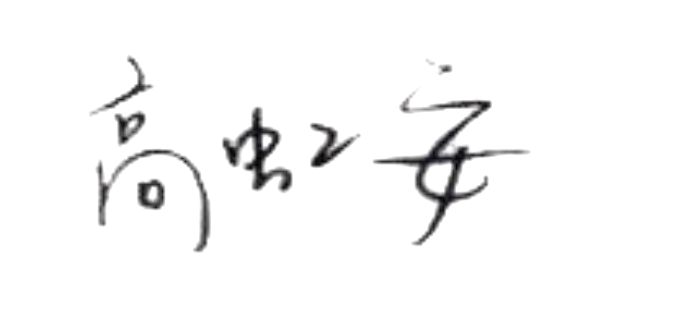

Kao Hung-an (Chinese: 高虹安; pinyin: Gāo Hóng'ān; born 25 January 1984), also known by her English name Ann, is a Taiwanese engineer and politician. She worked for Foxconn until 2020, when she was elected to the Legislative Yuan as a member of the Taiwan People's Party (TPP). Partway through her legislative term, Kao was elected Mayor of Hsinchu during the 2022 local election cycle. On 26 July 2024, Kao was suspended from office and left the TPP due to corruption allegations.

== Early life and education ==
Kao was born on 25 January 1984 in Taipei, Taiwan. She was raised in the city's Neihu District. Her father worked as a computer graphics engineer, while her mother was an administrator at St. Francis High School in Taipei. As a child, Kao developed an interest in computers and began using a dial-up modem to access bulletin board systems (BBS) while she was in kindergarten. During elementary school, she became interested in role-playing video games, including Xuan-Yuan Sword and Princess Maker.

Kao attended Taipei First Girls' High School, where she participated in the school's marching band and flag team. Initially intending to become a computer science teacher, she then enrolled at National Taiwan Normal University. She was admitted to study information education there and was ranked first among admitted students in that admissions category. She graduated with a Bachelor of Science in computer science and engineering.

After completing her undergraduate studies, Kao earned a Master of Science in computer science and information engineering from National Taiwan University in 2008. Her master's thesis examined methods of extracting reader comments from blog posts for use in opinion mining. She graduated with the highest academic grades in her master's program and was selected for membership in the Phi Tau Phi honor society. She then pursued doctoral studies in the United States, earning her Ph.D. in mechanical engineering from the University of Cincinnati in 2018. Her doctoral dissertation was titled, Quality Prediction Modeling for Multistage Manufacturing Using Classification and Association Rule Mining Techniques.

== Early career ==
After earning her master's degree, Kao worked at the Institute for Information Industry (III), a Taiwanese technology research organization, as an associate engineer, project manager, and section chief until May 2018. She also interned as a product engineer at the American semiconductor equipment manufacturer Lam Research.

In 2012, Kao was assigned to the United States by the institute to do cooperative research with the University of Cincinnati, where she simultaneously also began her doctoral studies in mechanical engineering. Her research involved intelligent maintenance systems, industrial data analysis, and the application of information technology to manufacturing processes. During this period, she worked under Jay Lee, a professor at the University of Cincinnati who was also the vice chairman of Foxconn.

== Computer engineer ==
At the Institute for Information Industry, Kao was a member of a research team that developed into the industrial technology company ServTech (科智企業). The team was selected for the institute's startup development program in December 2013, and ServTech was formally registered in March 2014. The company developed industrial data-processing technologies intended to improve manufacturing efficiency and support the digitalization of machine tools. In November 2014, ServTech won first place in the internet, mobile, and software computing category of the Intel Global Challenge, an international entrepreneurship competition held at the University of California, Berkeley. Kao assisted ServTech during its early development but remained employed at the Institute for Information Industry rather than transferring to the company.

In April 2017, Kao received the Youth Innovation Elite Award (創新菁英獎青年組) at the fifth National Industrial Innovation Awards, organized by Taiwan's Ministry of Economic Affairs. Her award recognized work on the Servolution integrated intelligent machine-tool services platform.

In 2018, Kao joined Foxconn following an introduction to the company's founder, Terry Gou, by her doctoral adviser Jay Lee. Gou recruited her to lead a newly established Industrial Big Data Office, with responsibility for advancing the company's adoption of industrial data analytics and Industry 4.0 technologies. She then served as a vice president of Foxconn and director of its Industrial Big Data Office. Her work focused on introducing artificial intelligence, industrial internet technologies, and data-driven methods into manufacturing operations.

== Legislative Yuan ==
Kao entered the Legislative Yuan following the 2020 Taiwanese legislative election, having been placed third on the Taiwan People's Party (TPP)'s proportional representation party list. She took office on 1 February 2020 as a member of the 10th Legislative Yuan. She initially served as secretary-general of the TPP's legislative caucus, a position she held during its first two legislative sessions. On 1 February 2021, she became deputy leader of the caucus, serving under Chiu Chen-yuan, while Tsai Pi-ru succeeded her as secretary-general. She was a member of the legislature's Education and Culture Committee during its first four sessions, before transferring to the Economics Committee for the fifth and sixth sessions. She also served on the Procedure Committee and the Expenditure Examination Committee, chairing the latter during the fifth legislative session.

On 11 July 2022, the TPP nominated Kao as its candidate for the 2022 Hsinchu mayoral election. She won the election on 26 November with 98,121 votes, becoming the first TPP politician to be elected mayor of Hsinchu. Following her election, Kao announced that she would complete the transfer of her remaining legislative responsibilities before assuming the mayoralty. Her resignation from the Legislative Yuan took effect on 25 December 2022, the day she assumed office as mayor, and she was succeeded by TPP member Chen Wan-hui under the party-list replacement system.

== Hsinchu mayoralty ==
In July 2022, the Taiwan People's Party nominated Kao as its candidate for Hsinchu mayor. Six candidates contested the office, including Lin Geng-ren of the Kuomintang and the Democratic Progressive Party's Shen Hui-hung. During Kao's campaign, Mirror Media reported that her doctoral dissertation, authored at the University of Cincinnati, was allegedly plagiarized from two studies she had taken part in as a researcher. Both the research and Kao's doctoral study were subsidized by the Institute for Information Industry. She filed a defamation lawsuit against Mirror Media for publishing the allegations. Institute president Cho Cheng-hung later told the Legislative Yuan that Kao's doctoral thesis had plagiarized 70–80% of the report she had written for the III. On 25 October 2022, the III sued Kao, claiming that she had used copyrighted information in her doctoral thesis. Later, prosecutors declined to charge her for breach of trust due to insufficient evidence, ending the III's legal actions against Kao.

Separately, Lin Geng-ren accused Kao of violating the Anti-Corruption Act. Lin also questioned whether Kao had fraudulently hired her alleged partner. The Ministry of Justice Investigation Bureau duly investigated Kao on these and other allegations, including accepting illegal political donations. The day before the 2022 mayoral election, a whistleblower brought attention to an instance of alleged intimidation by a member of Kao's legislative staff toward a former member of the staff. Despite the allegations against Kao, she won the mayoral election with 98,121 votes (45%), ahead of Shen (35.7%) and Lin (18%). Prior to taking office as mayor, investigators searched Kao's legislative offices and questioned her in regards to the allegations against her.

Upon taking office on 25 December 2022, Kao became the first female Mayor of Hsinchu, and the youngest female county magistrate or mayor in Taiwanese history. Her legislative seat was filled by Chen Wan-hui.

In June 2024, following Kao's indictment, an anonymous person launched a campaign to recall her as mayor, citing issues such as an apartment complex fire and allegations of allowing her boyfriend to "exert undue influence in city affairs." As of August, the campaign failed to gain enough signatures in a first-round petition. Organizers said the campaign had reached 53% of the required threshold of signatures in mid-December.

On 26 July 2024, Kao was suspended by Ministry of the Interior from the position of mayor due to corruption charges. Her deputy, Andy Chiu served as the acting mayor during Kao's suspension. After she was cleared of corruption charges, the Hsinchu City Government applied for Kao's reinstatement in December 2025, which was approved by the interior ministry on 17 December. Kao returned to office the following day.

== Legal issues ==
=== Corruption charges related to overtime pay ===
On 14 August 2023, prosecutors charged Kao with corruption dating back to her tenure as a legislator. Kao denied the allegations, and said that the indictment was politically motivated. The following month, the Taiwan People's Party temporarily suspended Kao's party membership rights pending a verdict on the case.

On 26 July 2024, the Taipei District Court found Kao guilty of violating the Anti-Corruption Act and the Criminal Code. Specifically, the court found her guilty of embezzling NT$116,514 and sentenced her to seven years and four months in prison. The court also said that she would lose her civil rights for four years. In accordance with the law, Kao was suspended from office. Subsequently, she announced her withdrawal as a member of the Taiwan People's Party. Kao said that the ruling was unprecedented when compared to similar cases in the past decade. The TPP said that the sentence was disproportionate.

Kao appealed the case to the Taiwan High Court. In January 2025, the court paused their review of the case to seek guidance from the Constitutional Court, because the first paragraph of Article 32 of the Organic Law of the Legislative Yuan was found to contravene Article 18 of the Constitution. The Constitutional Court declined to hear the case. The High Court reversed Kao's conviction in December 2025 and found her not guilty of embezzling funds meant to pay legislative aides. However, the High Court imposed a six-month sentence on Kao for causing a public official to commit document forgery, which can be converted to a fine.

=== Allegation related to property developer ===
In September 2023, the Hsinchu District Prosecutors Office began investigating allegations made by Democratic Progressive Party city councilors. They alleged that Kao had improper ties to a property developer. Kao denied the allegations.

=== Dissertation controversy ===
In August 2024, the Taipei District Court sentenced Kao to ten months in prison after ruling that she had falsely accused Chen Shih-fen of defamation. Chen had accused Kao of plagiarism in her doctoral thesis. Kao said that she would appeal.
