= Andy Chiu =

Mayor of Hsinchu from 2024 to 2025

Chiu Chen-yuan MLY
- 邱臣遠
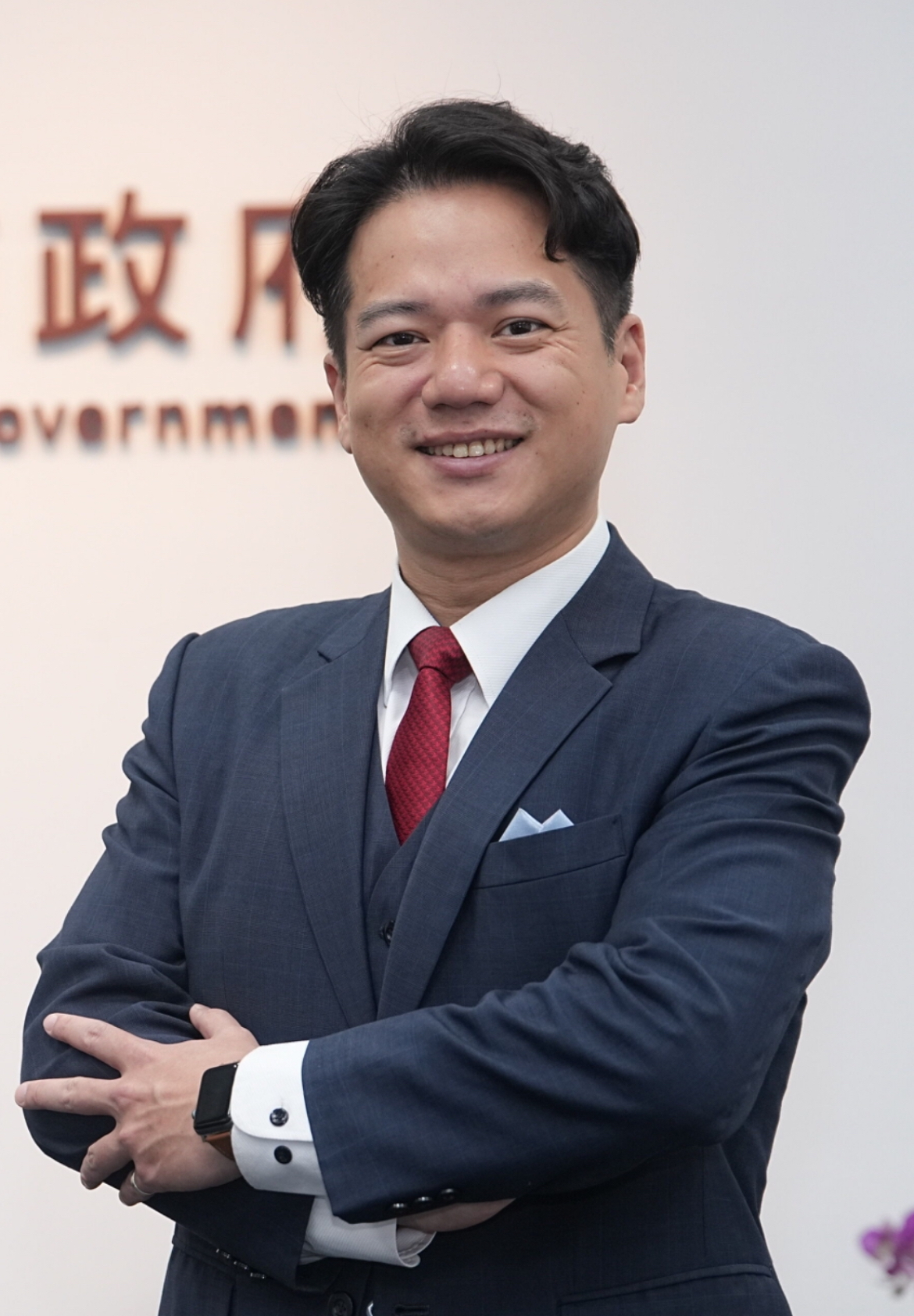
- Official portrait, 2024

Mayor of Hsinchu
- Acting; 26 July 2024 – 18 December 2025
- Deputy: Chang Chih-hsiang (Note: as Secretary-General of the Hsinchu City Government)
- Preceded by: Ann Kao
- Succeeded by: Ann Kao

8th Deputy Mayor of Hsinchu
- In office 1 February 2024 – 20 May 2026
- Mayor: Ann Kao; Himself (acting)
- Preceded by: Tsai Li-tsing (Note: Post vacant since 11 September 2023 until Chiu took office on 31 January 2024)
- Succeeded by: Lin Kun-han

2nd Leader of the Taiwan People's Party Caucus in the Legislative Yuan
- In office 1 February 2021 – 31 January 2024
- Deputy: Ann Kao; Lai Hsiang-ling
- Preceded by: Lai Hsiang-ling
- Succeeded by: Huang Kuo-chang

Member of the Legislative Yuan
- In office 1 February 2020 – 31 January 2024
- Constituency: Party-list

Personal details
- Born: 11 December 1981 (age 44) Taipei, Taiwan
- Party: Taiwan People's Party
- Education: Jinwen University of Science and Technology (BA); Vanung University (MA); Ming Chuan University (MBA)

Chiu Chen-yuan (Chinese: 邱臣遠; born 11 December 1981), also known by his English name Andy Chiu, is a Taiwanese politician who is the current deputy mayor and acting mayor of Hsinchu City since 2024. A member of Taiwan People's Party (TPP), he previously served as the caucus leader of the TPP in the Legislative Yuan.

== Education ==
Chiu graduated from Jinwen University of Science and Technology with a bachelor's degree in business administration and earned a master's degree in finance and banking from Vanung University. In 2010, he graduated from Ming Chuan University with a Master of Business Administration (M.B.A.) degree.

== Political career ==
=== Legislative Yuan ===
Chiu was ranked fourth on the Taiwan People's Party (TPP) party-list for the proportional representation nationwide and overseas constituency of the 2020 Taiwanese legislative election and was successfully elected Member of the Legislative Yuan.

He served as the caucus leader of the TPP in the Legislative Yuan from the sessions 3 to 8 of the 10th Legislative Yuan.

In the 2024 Taiwanese legislative election, Chiu ran for the legislative seat of the New Taipei City Constituency VIII as a TPP candidate, but was defeated by Kuomintang candidate Chang Chih-lun.

=== Hsinchu City Government ===
After Chiu's tenure as legislator ended, he was appointed Deputy Mayor of Hsinchu City, a position that had been vacant since 2023.

On 26 July 2024, Ann Kao, a member of the TPP and Mayor of Hsinchu, was suspended by the Ministry of the Interior from the position of mayor due to corruption charges. Chiu serves as the acting mayor during Kao's suspension.
