= Lin Geng-ren =

Taiwanese politician (born 1960)

Lin Geng-ren (born November 30, 1960) is a politician of the Republic of China (Taiwan). He is nicknamed “Hsinchu Ren,” “Xiangshan Uncle,” and “Big Ren”. A member of the Kuomintang (KMT), he has served as a Hsinchu City Councilor and Secretary-General of the KMT caucus . In 2022, he was nominated by the KMT as its candidate for the Hsinchu City mayoral election, but was ultimately not elected.

== Political Career ==
According to the Hsinchu City Council website (archived), Lin Geng-ren proposed policy platforms such as “speaking up for the people of Xiangshan,” “actively striving to make Xiangshan the future new urban core of Hsinchu City,” “working to ensure employment opportunities for everyone in Xiangshan,” and “actively promoting the Southern Xiangshan Urban Plan (parks and recreation)”. During the COVID-19 pandemic, Lin called on fellow city councilors to proactively donate supplies to frontline personnel to express gratitude to epidemic prevention workers .

=== 2022 Hsinchu City Mayoral Campaign ===
On June 22, 2022, Lin Geng-ren was officially nominated by the Kuomintang as its candidate for Mayor of Hsinchu City . On September 21, his campaign headquarters was established. His campaign vision was “Comfortable, Stress-Reduced, and Sustainable Hsinchu,” supported by five policy directions: “Safe Hsinchu,” “Convenient Hsinchu,” “Quality Hsinchu,” “Educational Hsinchu,” and “Future Hsinchu” . He ultimately failed to win the election.

=== Accusations Against Ko Wen-an Over Fraudulent Assistant Expenses ===
On October 31, 2022, Lin Geng-ren held a press conference together with several KMT Hsinchu City councilors, publicly accusing his election opponent, Ko Wen-an of the Taiwan People’s Party, of corruption. The accusations included hiring her boyfriend as a publicly funded legislative assistant, alleged insider trading involving TechSci (Ke-Zhi) stocks, and conflicts of interest. Lin directly criticized Ko for improper personnel decisions and repeated falsehoods, stating that she was not a suitable candidate for mayor .

Lin subsequently further accused Ko Wen-an of fraudulently claiming assistant expenses, requiring assistants to remit overtime pay, and engaging in “low salary, high reimbursement” practices involving public funds allocated to Legislative Yuan office assistants . Former Zhubei City party office executive director Lin Guan-nian, whose party membership and Zhubei mayoral nomination had been revoked by the Taiwan People’s Party, submitted documents to the Investigation Bureau’s Northern Regional Mobile Workstation, reporting Ko Wen-an for fraudulently claiming assistant expenses . The case was forwarded to the Taipei District Prosecutors Office for investigation.

On July 26, 2024, the Taipei District Court sentenced Ko Wen-an to 7 years and 4 months in prison under the Anti-Corruption Act, deprived her of public rights for four years, and she was subsequently suspended from her position as Mayor of Hsinchu City and had her salary halted by the Ministry of the Interior. On the same day, Lin Geng-ren posted on Facebook: “The cycle of karma, justice above us, respect for the judiciary, and rigorous judgment”.

== Controversies ==
=== “Thousand-Table Banquet for Ten Thousand People” ===
On the evening of December 26, 2015, the KMT caucus of the Hsinchu City Council hosted a year-end appreciation banquet with 1,035 tables at the Shulintou Night Market Plaza on Dongda Road, entertaining nearly 10,000 people. As this occurred during the presidential and legislative election period, it was accused of constituting vote-buying. Prosecutors investigated and indicted the event organizer, City Councilor Lin Geng-ren, and his secretary Wu Jun-hong for allegedly violating the Election and Recall Act .

After trial at the Hsinchu District Court, Judge Lai Shu-min acquitted both Lin and Wu . One of the reasons cited was testimony from banquet attendees, who stated that “the food was terrible” and that “eating one meal should not be enough to influence voting intentions”.

== Greater Hsinchu Metropolitan Area Controversy ==
On August 9, 2022, Lin Geng-ren proposed the concept of a “Greater Hsinchu Living Circle” on social media as part of his mayoral platform . He stated that he and Yang Wen-ke would, if elected, promote light rail construction, bus systems, and highway development, as well as strengthen river conservation and environmental resources, jointly advancing sustainable policies. However, rival candidate Shen Hui-hong criticized him, noting that Lin had opposed the Hsinchu light rail project while serving as a city councilor in 2017, and had even boycotted legislation related to the merger and upgrade of Greater Hsinchu, accusing him of lacking a consistent core ideology .

In response to accusations of inconsistent positions on light rail, Lin stated that in 2017, then-Mayor Lin Chih-chien proposed a NT$30 billion light rail plan, with NT$12 billion funded by the central government and NT$18 billion to be self-financed locally. Lin argued that for such a major project, the city government failed to provide a complete feasibility assessment, including population changes, projected ridership, and self-financing ratios. He described such hasty planning as “treating light rail like a child’s game.” He further criticized former Mayor Lin Chih-chien and former Deputy Mayor Shen Hui-hong for viewing light rail as the sole solution to Hsinchu’s transportation problems, calling it a policy mistake even more dangerous than corruption, and stated that the KMT city council caucus could not accept it at the time. Lin emphasized that light rail and bus system improvements should proceed in parallel, first cultivating public transportation usage habits to meet the city’s actual needs .

=== Master’s Thesis Plagiarism Controversy ===
==== National Chiao Tung University Thesis Plagiarism and Degree Revocation ====
On September 5, 2022, while Lin Geng-ren was running for Hsinchu City mayor on behalf of the KMT, the Democratic Progressive Party caucus accused him of plagiarism in his 2010 National Chiao Tung University thesis, titled “An Analysis of the Current Situation and Future Development Suggestions for Hsinchu City—Using Public Security, Transportation, and Tourism as Examples.” The DPP caucus alleged that Lin used his position as a councilor to access non-public government materials, extensively plagiarized government reports, mixed citations indiscriminately, copied and pasted official statistics, and plagiarized content from ten government reports, with a similarity rate as high as 60% .

Lin responded that while his thesis might not have been well written, he would not yield to what he described as a smear campaign. He stated that all referenced materials were publicly available and properly cited, in accordance with academic norms, and that he voluntarily submitted the thesis to National Yang Ming Chiao Tung University for investigation . On December 28 of the same year, it was confirmed that his degree was revoked, on the grounds of plagiarism and improper citation .

==== Chung Hua University Thesis Found Not to Be Plagiarized; Degree Retained ====
On September 7, online personality Yin-di the Great further alleged that Lin Geng-ren’s thesis at Chung Hua University also contained plagiarism concerns, claiming that the acknowledgments section thanking his wife and family was nearly identical to other texts, with only names substituted. Lin stated that his thesis had undergone comparison and met Chung Hua University’s current standards, and that its originality was beyond question .

On October 21, Chung Hua University announced the results of its investigation, stating that after comparison, the thesis conformed to existing regulations. The review committee concluded that plagiarism was not established, and Lin’s master’s degree was retained. However, regarding deficiencies in academic writing, the university stated it would urge greater rigor and caution in future thesis writing .
