= Huang Ching-yin =

Taiwanese politician

- 黃瀞瑩
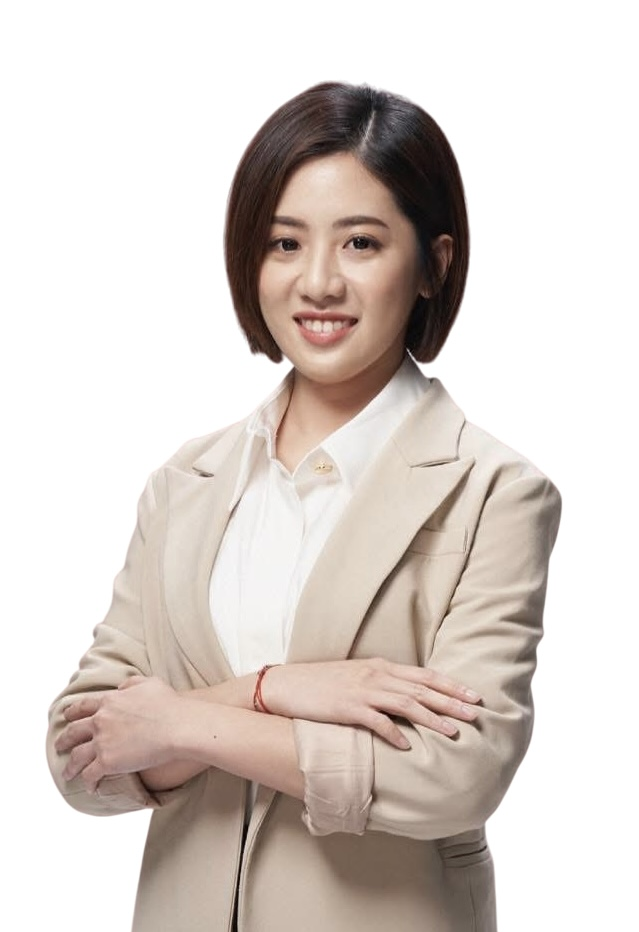
- Official portrait, 2022

Taipei City Councillor
- Incumbent
- Assumed office 25 December 2022
- Constituency: Shilin and Beitou

Personal details
- Born: 10 June 1992 (age 34) Taipei, Taiwan
- Party: Taiwan People's Party (since 2019)
- Spouse: Liu Chia-yao (m. 2024)
- Education: Fu Jen Catholic University (BA); University of London (MA)
- Nickname(s): Hsueh-chieh, Tina

Chinese name
- Chinese: 黃瀞瑩
Transcriptions
Standard Mandarin
- Hanyu Pinyin: Huáng Jìngyíng
- Wade–Giles: Huang^{2} Ching^{4}-ying^{2}
Southern Min
- Hokkien POJ: N̂g Chēng-êng

Huang Ching-yin (Chinese: 黃瀞瑩; pinyin: Huáng Jìngyíng; Pe̍h-ōe-jī: N̂g Chēng-êng; born 10 June 1992), nicknamed Hsueh-chieh (Chinese: 學姐), is a Taiwanese politician who has served as Taipei City Councillor for the 1st constituency since 2022.

A native of Taipei and a member of the Taiwan People's Party, Huang was formerly a reporter for online news outlet ETtoday News Cloud. She was previously responsible for managing social media for former Mayor of Taipei Ko Wen-je, and served as a deputy spokesperson for the Taipei City Government. In 2020, she ran as a Taiwan People's Party candidate for legislator-at-large in the Legislative Yuan. Huang was elected to the Taipei City Council in November 2022, coming first in a field of 25 candidates for Taipei City Constituency I, which includes the northern Taipei districts of Beitou District and Huang's hometown of Shilin District.

== Early life ==
Huang was born on 10 June 1992 and raised in Tianmu in the Shilin District of Taipei. Her father founded a small business selling wire, while her mother worked as an accountant. She has one younger brother. Huang attended Wenlin Elementary School, Taipei Municipal Lanya Junior High School, and Taipei Municipal Minglun High School. While at Minglun High School, Huang was a member of the mass communication club, and began to be interested in journalism and the mass media.

Huang earned her undergraduate degree in journalism at Fu Jen Catholic University. Although her father made sure that she declared subjects such as finance or business management as her choices to study at university, Huang also insisted on choosing journalism; based on her university entrance exam results, she ended up qualifying to study journalism. Huang also holds an MA in political communication from Goldsmiths, University of London.

While studying at the Department of Journalism & Communication Studies at Fu Jen Catholic University, Huang originally wanted to be a newscaster, but later decided that she would be more suited to being a reporter. Huang aspired to be a sports reporter, but was unsuccessful in finding a position, despite applying for several such roles. After an introduction by a senior classmate, Huang began working the political news beat for online media, thus beginning her association with politics. Among her first assignments for ETtoday News Cloud was the 2014 Taipei mayoral election race, during which she primarily covered the Sean Lien campaign.

Huang's first media appearance was in 2013, when, as a student, she appeared briefly in a street interview by Lucifer Chu in Taipei about the Top Ten Villains of the year.

== Political career ==
Huang's first job in politics was as a parliamentary assistant to Democratic Progressive Party legislator Su Chiao-hui. In this role, she was responsible for Su Chiao-hui's social media accounts.

In 2018, Huang joined the Taipei City Government Secretariat as a member of the Media Affairs Group. Due to her strong English language skills, she was assigned to run Ko Wen-je's Twitter account. In her early days working for the Taipei City Government, Ko Wen-je gave her the nickname "short and small girl".

In July 2018, Huang was featured in a video titled "A Day in the Life of Mayor Advisors feat. Ko Wen-je", episode 69 in the "A Day in the Life of" series from Camerabay streaming show Thursday Super Playing. After the show was posted to YouTube, it became a popular topic for discussion by netizens, and became the hottest YouTube video of the week in Taiwan. In the video, Huang played the part of "Hsueh-chieh", leading the show's host, Andy Tai Chih-yuan, in experiencing a day in the life of a staffer in the office of the Mayor of Taipei. Huang only ended up appearing on the show because she was spotted by the show's producer walking past the open door of a meeting room in which the show was being planned. Huang unexpectedly became the center of much attention online and in the media.

On 25 December 2018, as a result of Ko Wen-je's successful campaign for re-election as mayor, Huang and Ke Yu-an became deputy spokespeople for the Taipei City Government, assisting spokesperson Liu I-ting. From 27 March 2019, Huang began hosting the Taipei Broadcasting Station program "Taipei Progressive".

In 2019, Huang resigned from her role at the city government to run for election to the Legislative Yuan as a Taiwan People's Party (TPP) legislator-at-large candidate. Ko Wen-je referred to Huang as being able to vacuum up votes for the TPP, and she campaigned actively for other candidates on the party ticket. Huang was not elected due to being too far down the TPP party list, and, in February 2020, she was reappointed as a deputy spokesperson for the Taipei City Government.

=== 2020 legislative election ===
On 6 August 2019, the Taiwan People's Party was established, with Huang as a founding member. On 19 November 2019, the Taiwan People's Party issued its party list of candidates for the role of legislator-at-large; Huang appeared as the thirteenth name on a list of 28, a position that was not high enough on the list to secure her election to the Legislative Yuan in 2020.

=== 2022 Taipei City Council elections ===
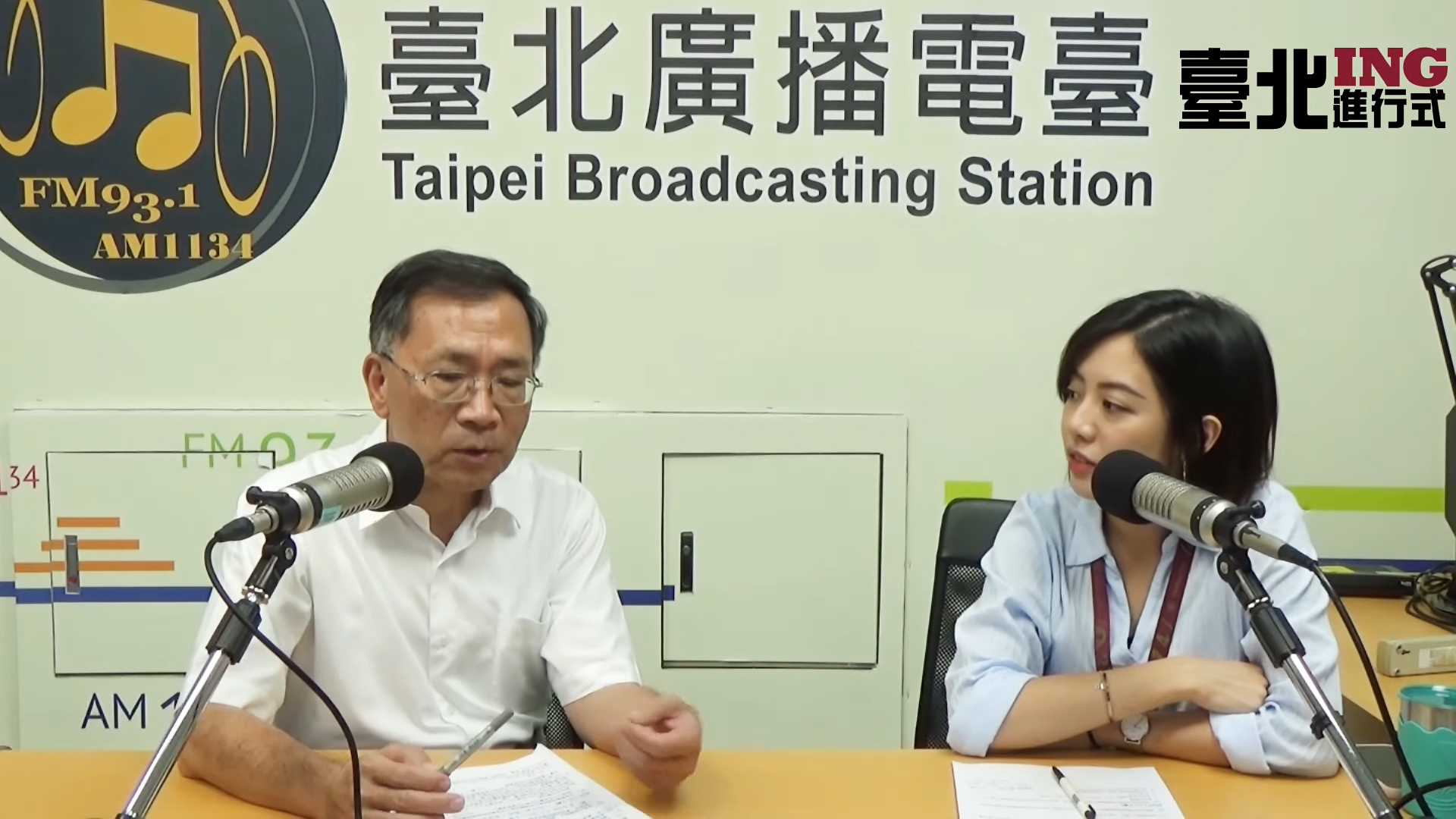
Huang at a radio interview by Taipei Broadcasting Station (2020)

On 26 November 2022, having run for election to the Taipei City Council on the Taiwan People's Party (TPP) ticket in Taipei City Constituency I, which includes the northern Taipei districts of Beitou District and Shilin District, Huang came first in a field of 25 candidates for the constituency, winning 29,270 votes (10.63%) to secure one of the 12 seats up for election.

=== Taipei City Council ===
As an elected representative for Taiwan's capital, Huang has worked on public issues including those relating to healthcare and social housing. In November 2022, she had her blood taken while attending an event to publicize participation in Taiwan's hematopoietic stem cell blood test system and bone marrow donor database. In June 2025, Huang called on the Taipei City Government to improve its policies concerning childhood vaccination notifications, citing the case of vaccination reminders having been sent to the mother of an already deceased child. In September 2025, Huang attended the "unboxing" of the Kuang-Tz'u social housing complex in Taipei to help publicize its facilities, including the availability of medical clinic and nursery facilities.

As a Taiwan People's Party Taipei representative, in August 2025, Huang was shown on national television attending the trial in Taipei of Ko Wen-je in support of the former Mayor of Taipei in the Core Pacific City case. In September 2025, Huang again publicly expressed her support for Ko Wen-je, stating that she looked forward to welcoming him home on his release, leading to further expressions of support from others in support of the former mayor.

== Personal life ==
Huang has spoken of the difficulties that arose in her personal life when she shot to fame as a result of appearing on the Thursday Super Playing show on YouTube, including not being accustomed to being a public figure or being recognized on the street. While still in her twenties, Huang overnight became the subject of intense media attention, and discovered that she was often followed and photographed by paparazzi even when not at work.

In March 2024, Huang's marriage to journalist Liu Chia-yao was reported by Taiwanese media outlets; their subsequent wedding banquet in July 2024, which was attended by guests including former Taipei mayor Ko Wen-je, also received coverage from various media organizations. In August 2025, media outlets reported the news of Huang's pregnancy, noting Huang's stated use of fertility treatment as well as her publicly stated relief at having been able to conceive.
