= Lin Li-chan =

Taiwanese politician

Lin Li-chan MLY
- 林麗蟬
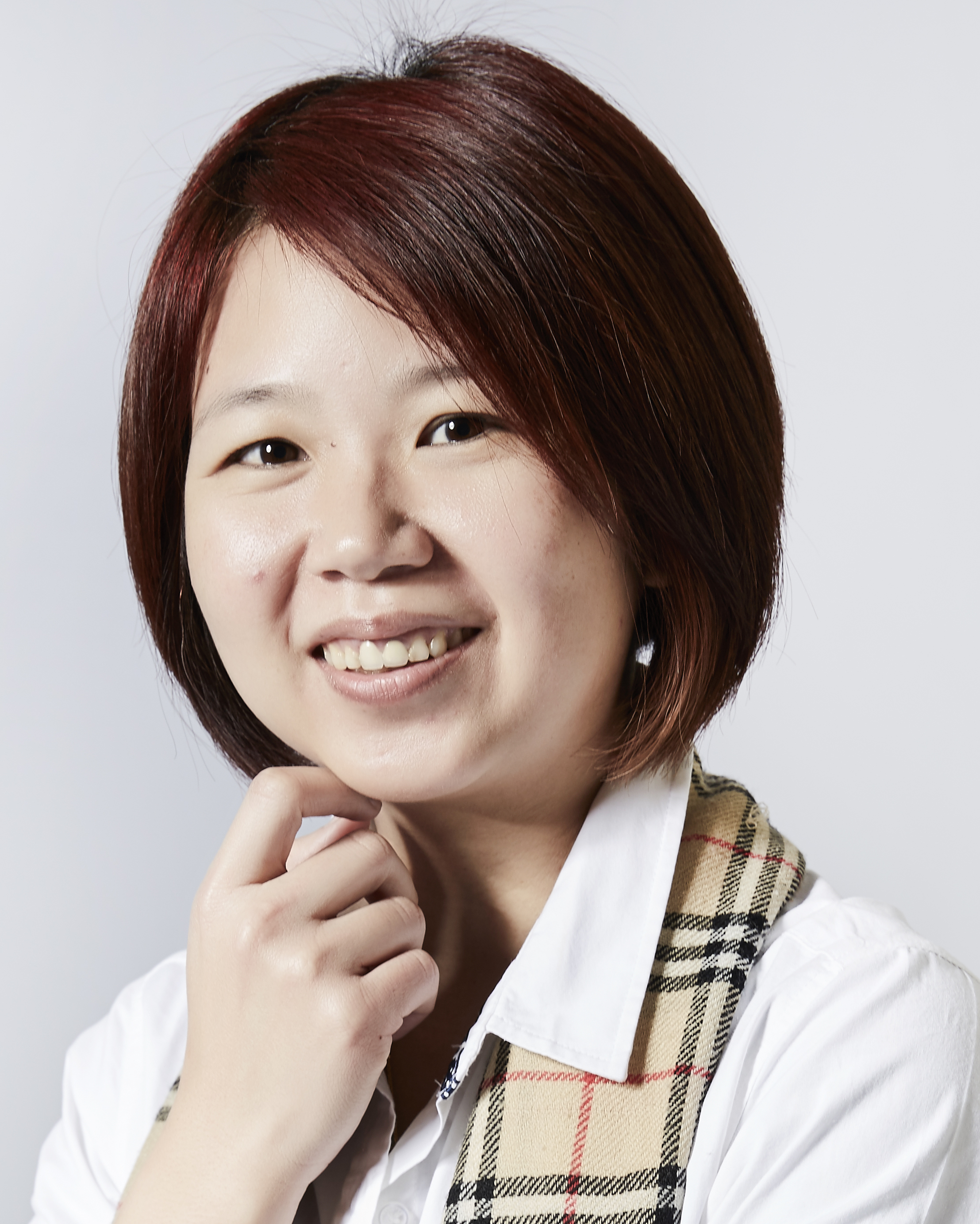

Member of the Legislative Yuan
- In office 1 February 2016 – 31 January 2020
- Constituency: Party-list (Kuomintang)

Personal details
- Born: 2 October 1977 (age 48) Phnom Penh, Cambodia
- Party: Kuomintang
- Education: Chienkuo Technology University (BS); National Chi Nan University (MA, PhD)

Lin Li-chan (Chinese: 林麗蟬; pinyin: Lín Lìchán; Khmer: លីន លីចាន់; born 2 October 1977) is a Taiwanese politician. She was the first immigrant to Taiwan to be elected a member of the Legislative Yuan, where she served one term from 2016 to 2020.

== Biography ==
Lin was born in Cambodia to an ethnic Chinese family of Teochew descent. She is a naturalized citizen of Taiwan. Her father died in a traffic collision, and, when she was 20, her mother married Lin to a Taiwanese man, Hsieh Shui-chin, for money. They had two children.

Lin learned Taiwanese Hokkien and Taiwanese Mandarin both around the house and while working at a factory. After graduating from Chienkuo Technology University, she obtained a master's degree in non-profit organization management at National Chi Nan University to improve her Mandarin. She then later earned a Ph.D. in Southeast Asian studies from National Chi Nan University.

Prior to her political career, Lin was engaged in volunteer work for many causes, including the Taiwan New Immigrant Development and Exchange Association. She has also worked in radio.

Lin was named as a candidate for the 2016 legislative election in November 2015. Listed fourth on the Kuomintang proportional representation ballot, she became the first immigrant to win a seat in the Legislative Yuan.

Near the end of her term in the Ninth Legislative Yuan, Lin was offered an advisory position to the Kaohsiung City Government led by mayor Han Kuo-yu.
