= Chen Wan-hui =

Taiwanese politician (born 1974)

Carol Chen Chen Wan-hui MLY
- 陳琬惠
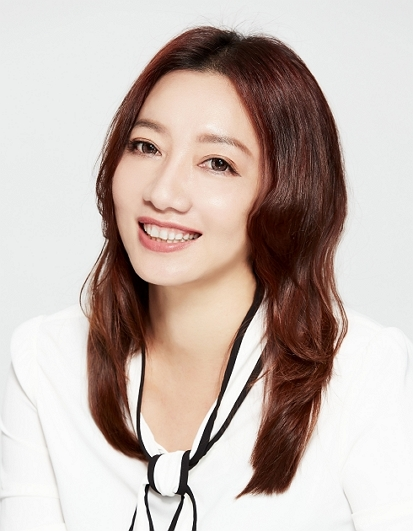
- Official portrait, 2022

Member of the Legislative Yuan
- In office 28 December 2022 – 31 January 2024
- Preceded by: Ann Kao
- Constituency: Party-list (Taiwan People's Party)

Personal details
- Born: 11 September 1974 (age 52) Tainan, Taiwan
- Party: Taiwan People's Party
- Education: National Chengchi University (MBA)

Carol Chen Wan-hui (Chinese: 陳琬惠; born 11 September 1974) is a Taiwanese politician. She was appointed a party-list member of the Legislative Yuan in 2022, representing the Taiwan People's Party. Chen replaced Ann Kao, who had been elected the Mayor of Hsinchu. Chen stepped down from the legislature in 2024.

== Early life, education, and career ==
Chen was born on 11 September 1974. She is also known by the English name Carol Chen. After completing an Executive Master of Business Administration degree at National Chengchi University, she served as secretary-general of the Financial Literacy and Education Association.

== Political career ==
In 2019, Chen joined the newly founded Taiwan People's Party, and was ranked ninth on the party list for proportional representation. Although she was not elected to the Legislative Yuan during the 2020 legislative election, the TPP named Chen director of its legislative caucus office. She retained the post after accepting the party's nomination for the Yilan County magistracy in July 2022. During her magisterial campaign, Chen discussed water reclamation and storage proposals in Yilan, and made public appearances alongside TPP candidates for local legislative office. Chen won 16,412 votes, or 6.98 percent of the vote, finishing behind Kuomintang incumbent magistrate Lin Zi-miao and Democratic Progressive Party candidate Chiang Tsung-yuan. Chen subsequently succeeded Ann Kao, who had won the Hsinchu mayoralty, as a member of the Legislative Yuan.
