= Tang Hui-jen =

Taiwanese politician

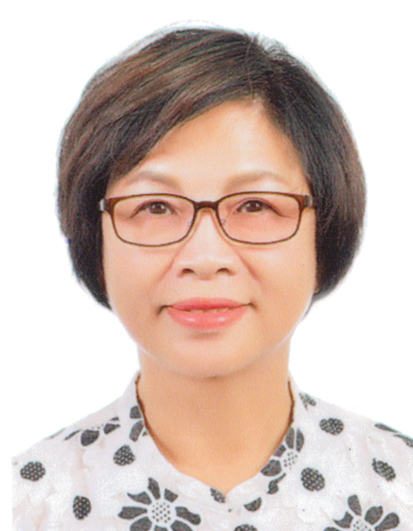
Tang Hui-jen

Tang Hui-jen (Chinese: 湯蕙禎; born 3 October 1954) is a Taiwanese politician.

== Early life and education ==
Tang was born in Taoyuan on 3 October 1954 and studied law at National Taiwan University.

== Political career ==
Tang served on the National Assembly from 1996 to 2000. She later worked for the legal affairs department of the Taoyuan County government and subsequently led the Taoyuan City Government Department of Civil Affairs. Tang was elected to the 10th Legislative Yuan on the Democratic Progressive Party list via proportional representation.

In November 2020, Tang attended the tenth anniversary celebration of the Taoyuan International Airport Corporation. In March 2021, Tang advocated for victims of revenge pornography to have increased legal protections, and expressed support for the establishment of a legal framework for the crimes of stalking and harassment. The next month, Tang called for existing regulations on Chinese publications to be more strictly enforced. In August 2022, she drew attention to a non-profit collecting human hair and nylon stockings for use as an absorbent to clean up oil spills.
