= Labor Standards Act =

Labor Standards Act is the English name given to legislation governing labour in the following countries:

- Labor Standards Act (Japan), enacted in April 1947
- Labor Standards Act (South Korea), enacted in 1953
