= National Chi Nan University =

University in Puli Township, Taiwan

National Chi-Nan University
- 國立暨南國際大學 (Chinese)
- Motto: 誠樸弘毅、務本致用; Sêng-phok hông-gē, bū-pún tì-iōng
- Type: Public
- Established: 1995
- President: Dong sing wuu
- Faculty: 594 (as of 2015)
- Undergraduates: 6,353(as of 2016)
- Postgraduates: 1,781(as of 2014)
- Doctoral students: 324 (as of 2014)
- Location: Nantou County, Taiwan; 23.9530°N 120.9347°E
- Campus: Suburban
- Website: ncnu.edu.tw

Chinese name
- Simplified Chinese: 国立暨南国际大学
- Traditional Chinese: 國立暨南國際大學
- Literal meaning: National University of Reaching Southward
Transcriptions
Standard Mandarin
- Hanyu Pinyin: Guólì Jìnán Guójì Dàxué
- Wade–Giles: Kuo-li Chi-nan Kuo-chi Ta-hsuëh
Southern Min
- Hokkien POJ: Kok-li̍p Kì-lâm Kok-chè Tāi-ha̍k

National Chi Nan University (NCNU; Chinese: 國立暨南國際大學; pinyin: Guólì Jìnán Guójì Dàxué) is a public university located in Puli Township, Nantou County, Taiwan.

== History ==
=== Founding ===
The National Chi Nan University Planning Committee was established on 1 March 1991 in order to establish a university with the following missions:

1. To provide more higher education opportunities.
2. To improve the education of Overseas Taiwanese.
3. To assist in developing industries as a part of Six-Year National Construction Plan of Taiwan.
4. To balance cultural and educational development between regions.

Land which had been the property of the Taiwan Sugar Corporation was selected as the campus of the new university in January 1992. The initial phase of construction of the university was completed in July 1995. The first classes of graduate students were enrolled at the University in September 1995. The first classes of undergraduates registered in September 1996, along with the official opening of the campus.

=== 921 earthquake ===
When the devastating 1999 Jiji earthquake struck Nantou County on 21 September 1999 (921), all major buildings and dormitories in campus were critically damaged, and the University suffered a great loss of equipment and basic infrastructure. President Ricard Lee had led the three-day evacuation of the entire student body and the provisional relocation to the campus of National Taiwan University in Taipei City for one semester. The restoration of the campus was mostly completed in the following six months. The student body and all the Colleges went back to the campus in the next semester.

== Ranking ==
National Chi Nan University rankings

Global – Overall
- CWUR World: 1894 (2021)
- THE World: 1501+ (2024)

Regional – Overall
- QS Asia: 581–600 (2025)
- THE Asia: 501–600 (2024)

National – Overall
- CWUR National: 39 (2021)
- THE National: 35–45 (2024)

== Colleges ==
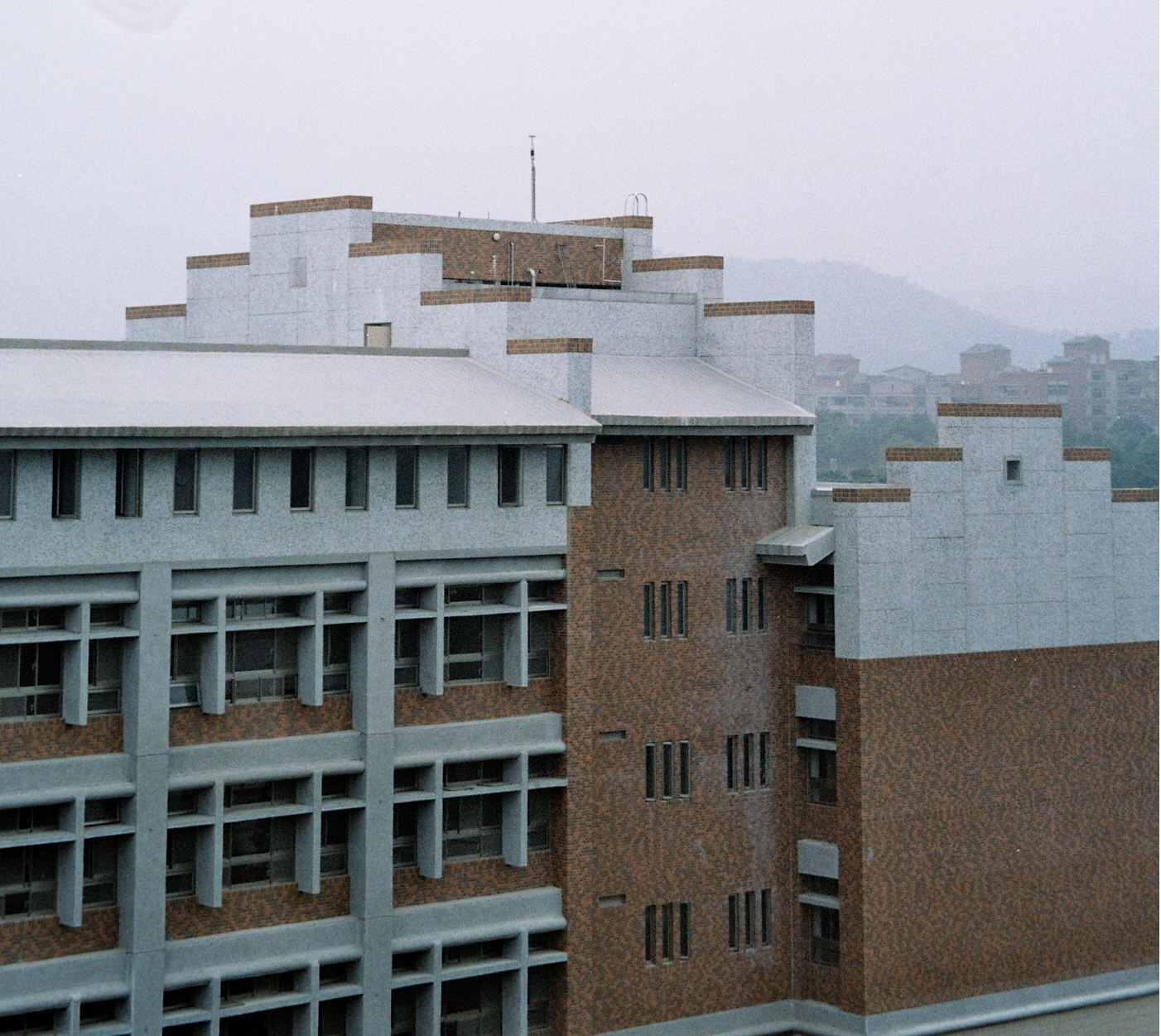
College of Humanities

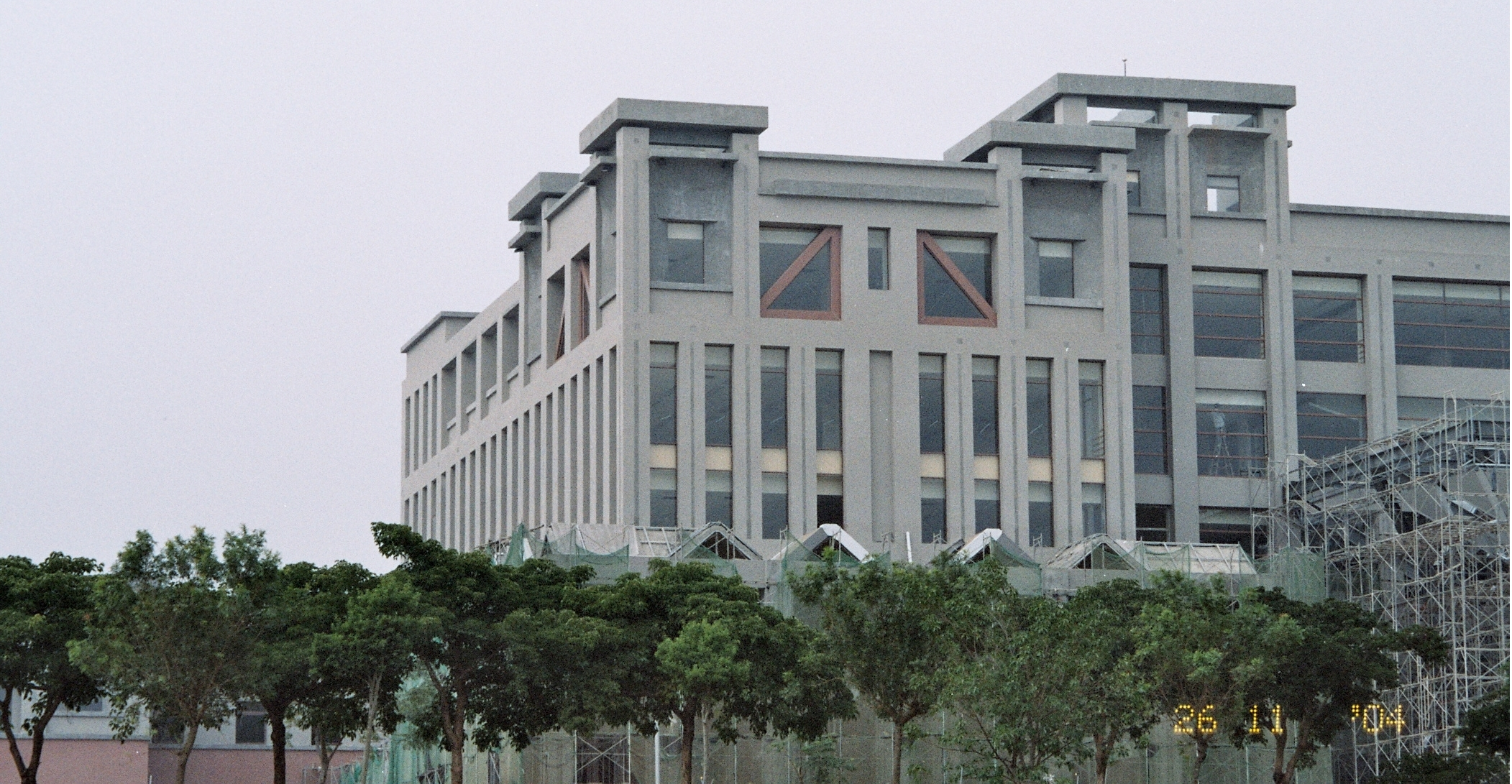
NCNU Library

NCNU has six colleges: Education, Humanities, Management, Science and Technology, Shui Sha Lian and Nursing and Health Welfare.

== Featuring ==
- The Taiwanese drama series, Hana Kimi was filmed here.

== Notable natives ==
- Lin Li-chan, member of Legislative Yuan

== See also ==
- List of universities in Taiwan
  - List of schools in the Republic of China reopened in Taiwan
