= Mayor of Hsinchu =

Chief executive of Hsinchu, Taiwan

Mayor of the City of Hsinchu
- Emblem of Hsinchu City

- Flag of Hsinchu City

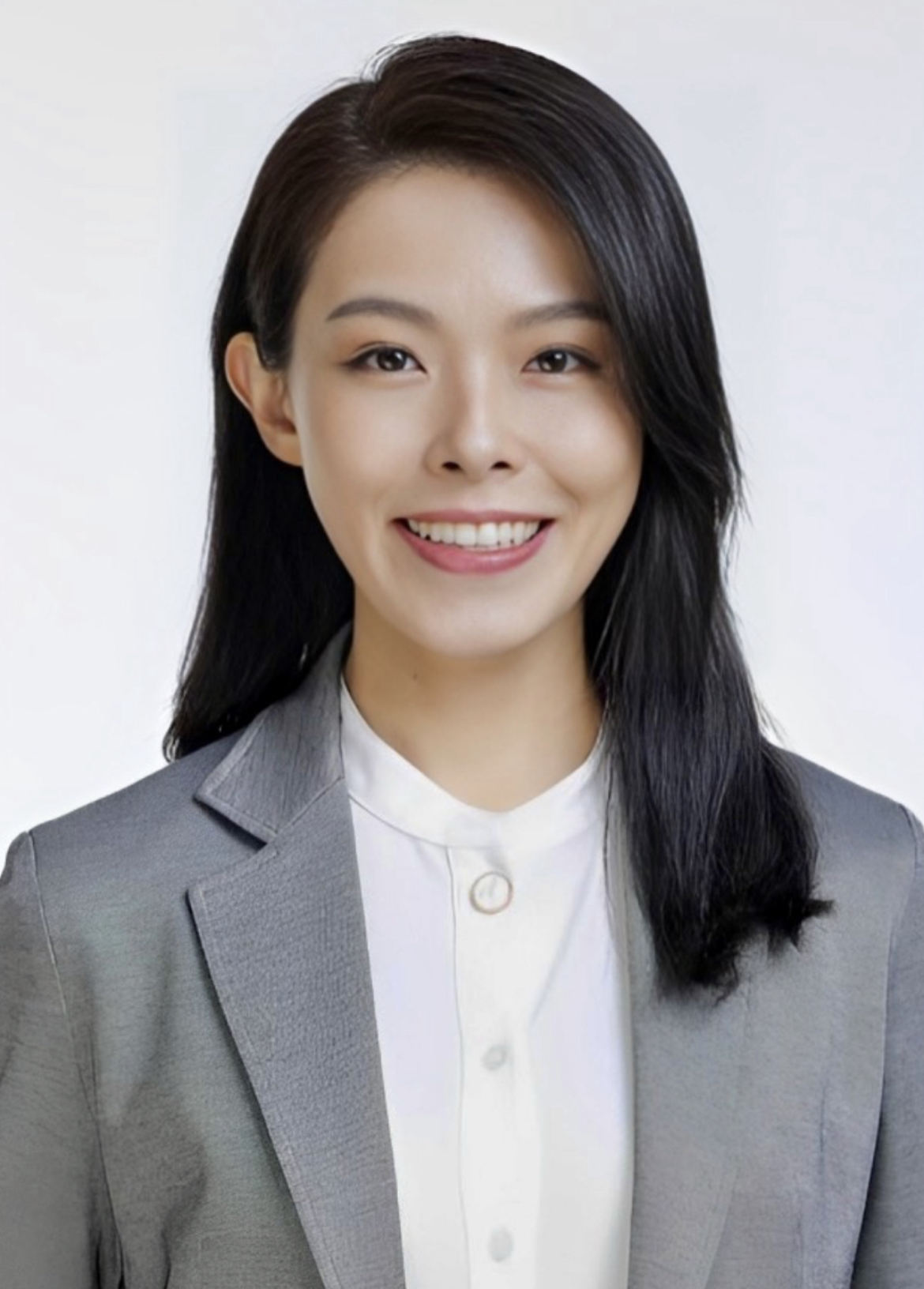
- Incumbent; Ann Kao since 25 December 2022
- Style: 市長
- Member of: Hsinchu City Government
- Term length: 4 years; may serve up to 2 consecutive terms
- Formation: 1982

The Mayor of Hsinchu is the chief executive of the government of Hsinchu City. This list includes mayors of the city's provincial era (1982 – present).

== Provincial era ==
Independent Kuomintang Democratic Progressive Party Taiwan People's Party

№	Portrait	Name (Birth–Death)	Term of Office		Political Party	Term
6		Shih Hsing-chung 施性忠; Shī Xìngzhōng (1938-)	1 July 1982	31 December 1983 (Note: Suspended due to corruption charges.) (Note: Resigned during suspension.)	Independent	1
–		Chang Hsien-tung (Note: As acting; provincial council member.) 張賢東; Zhāng Xiándōng (?-)	31 December 1983	7 April 1984	Kuomintang	1
–		Chen Pi-chi 陳丕勣; Chén Pījī (?-)	7 April 1984	2 July 1984	Kuomintang	1
6		Shih Hsing-chung 施性忠; Shī Xìngzhōng (1938-)	2 July 1984 (Note: Elected in by-election.)	10 July 1985 (Note: Removed from office.)	Independent	1
–		Chen Cheng-hsiung 陳正雄; Chén Zhèngxióng (?-)	10 July 1985	20 December 1985	Kuomintang	1
7		Jen Fu-yung 任富勇; Rén Fùyǒng (1940-2010)	20 December 1985	20 December 1989	Kuomintang	2
8		Tong Shen-nan 童勝男; Tóng Shèngnán (1944-)	20 December 1989	20 December 1993	Kuomintang	3
8		Tong Shen-nan 童勝男; Tóng Shèngnán (1944-)	20 December 1993	20 December 1997	Kuomintang	4
9		Tsai Jen-chien (Note: First Democratic Progressive Party mayor.) 蔡仁堅; Cài Rénjiān (1952-)	20 December 1997	20 December 2001 (Note: Lost reelection.)	Democratic Progressive Party	5
10		Lin Junq-tzer 林政則; Lín Zhèngzé (1944-)	20 December 2001	20 December 2005	Kuomintang	6
10		Lin Junq-tzer 林政則; Lín Zhèngzé (1944-)	20 December 2005	20 December 2009	Kuomintang	7
11		Hsu Ming-tsai 許明財; Xǔ Míngcái (1953-)	20 December 2009	25 December 2014	Kuomintang	8
12		Lin Chih-chien 林智堅; Lín Zhìjiān (1975-)	25 December 2014	25 December 2018	Democratic Progressive Party	9
12		Lin Chih-chien 林智堅; Lín Zhìjiān (1975-)	25 December 2018	8 July 2022 (Note: Resigned to run for Mayor of Taoyuan.)	Democratic Progressive Party	10
–		Chen Chang-hsien (Note: As acting; secretary-general of the city government.) 陳章賢; Chén Zhāngxián (?-)	8 July 2022	25 December 2022	Independent	10
13		Ann Kao (Note: First female mayor. Youngest elected mayor. First Taiwan People's Party mayor.) 高虹安; Gāo Hóng'ān (1984-)	25 December 2022	26 July 2024	Taiwan People's Party	11
–		Andy Chiu (Note: As acting; deputy mayor.) 邱臣遠; Qiū Chényuǎn (1981-)	26 July 2024	18 December 2025	Taiwan People's Party	11
13		Ann Kao 高虹安; Gāo Hóng'ān (1984-)	18 December 2025 (Note: Restored due to judgement)	Incumbent	Independent (Note: Left Taiwan People's Party on 26 July 2024)	11
