= Tsai Pi-ru =

Taiwanese nurse and politician

Tsai Pi-ru MLY
- 蔡壁如
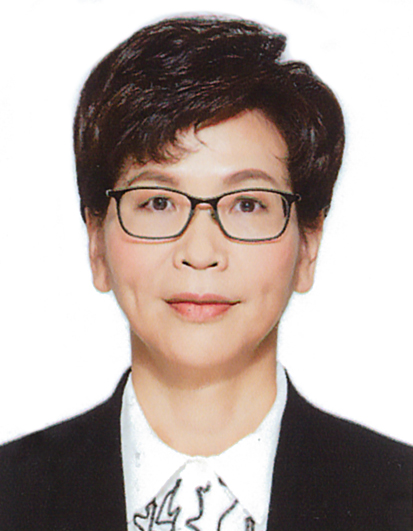
- Official portrait, 2020

Taichung Government Consultant
- In office 15 February 2024 – 26 December 2024
- Mayor: Lu Shiow-yen

Member of the Legislative Yuan
- In office 1 February 2020 – 17 October 2022
- Succeeded by: Cynthia Wu
- Constituency: Party-list

Member of the Central Committee of the Taiwan People's Party
- Incumbent
- Assumed office 19 January 2025
- Chairman: Huang Kuo-chang

Personal details
- Born: 11 March 1964 (age 62) Pingtung County, Taiwan
- Party: Taiwan People's Party
- Education: Meiho University (BA); Tamkang University (MA, rescinded)

Tsai Pi-ru (Chinese: 蔡壁如; pinyin: Cài Bìrú; born 11 March 1964) is a Taiwanese politician. She was a nurse and colleague of Ko Wen-je at National Taiwan University Hospital. After Ko was elected Mayor of Taipei in 2014, Tsai began her political career as Ko's chief of staff. In 2019, she became a founding member of the Taiwan People's Party led by Ko, and was elected to the 10th Legislative Yuan via party list proportional representation in 2020. Tsai resigned her legislative seat in 2022, and was replaced by Cynthia Wu.

== Early life, education, and career ==
Tsai was born on 11 March 1964 in Pingtung County. She graduated from Meiho University with a degree in midwifery. Tsai also attended Tamkang University's Management Information System Department on a part-time basis, completing a master's degree in 2019. Tamkang revoked Tsai's degree in 2022. Before pursuing politics, Tsai worked as a nurse at National Taiwan University Hospital, including over twenty years alongside surgeon Ko Wen-je.

== Political career ==
After Ko Wen-je was elected mayor of Taipei, Tsai joined his administration as chief of staff. She became an adviser to the Taipei City Government in 2018. Tsai is a founding member of the Taiwan People's Party, established in August 2019. During the 2020 Taiwanese legislative election cycle, Tsai commented on the TPP party list, but did not confirm her own placement on it. Eventually, Tsai ranked fifth on the party list and was seated to the 10th Legislative Yuan. In August 2022, Wang Hao-yu accused Tsai of plagiarizing her master's thesis. Tamkang University concluded an investigation into the allegations in October and revoked her degree. She posted a resignation letter to Facebook on 14 October 2022, and vacated her legislative seat on 17 October.

Tsai was nominated by the Taiwan People's Party for the Taichung City Constituency I seat held by Tsai Chi-chang in the 2024 legislative election. Her legislative campaign was also supported by the Kuomintang. After Tsai Pi-ru lost the election, she was appointed an advisor to Mayor of Taichung Lu Shiow-yen, and resigned the position in December 2024 to run for the TPP central committee.

Following Ko Wen-je's resignation as TPP chair on 1 January 2025, Tsai ran for party chair, but lost in a landslide to acting chair Huang Kuo-chang, who won 8,903 votes against Tsai's 360 votes.
