= New immigrant in Taiwan =

Taiwanese new immigrants
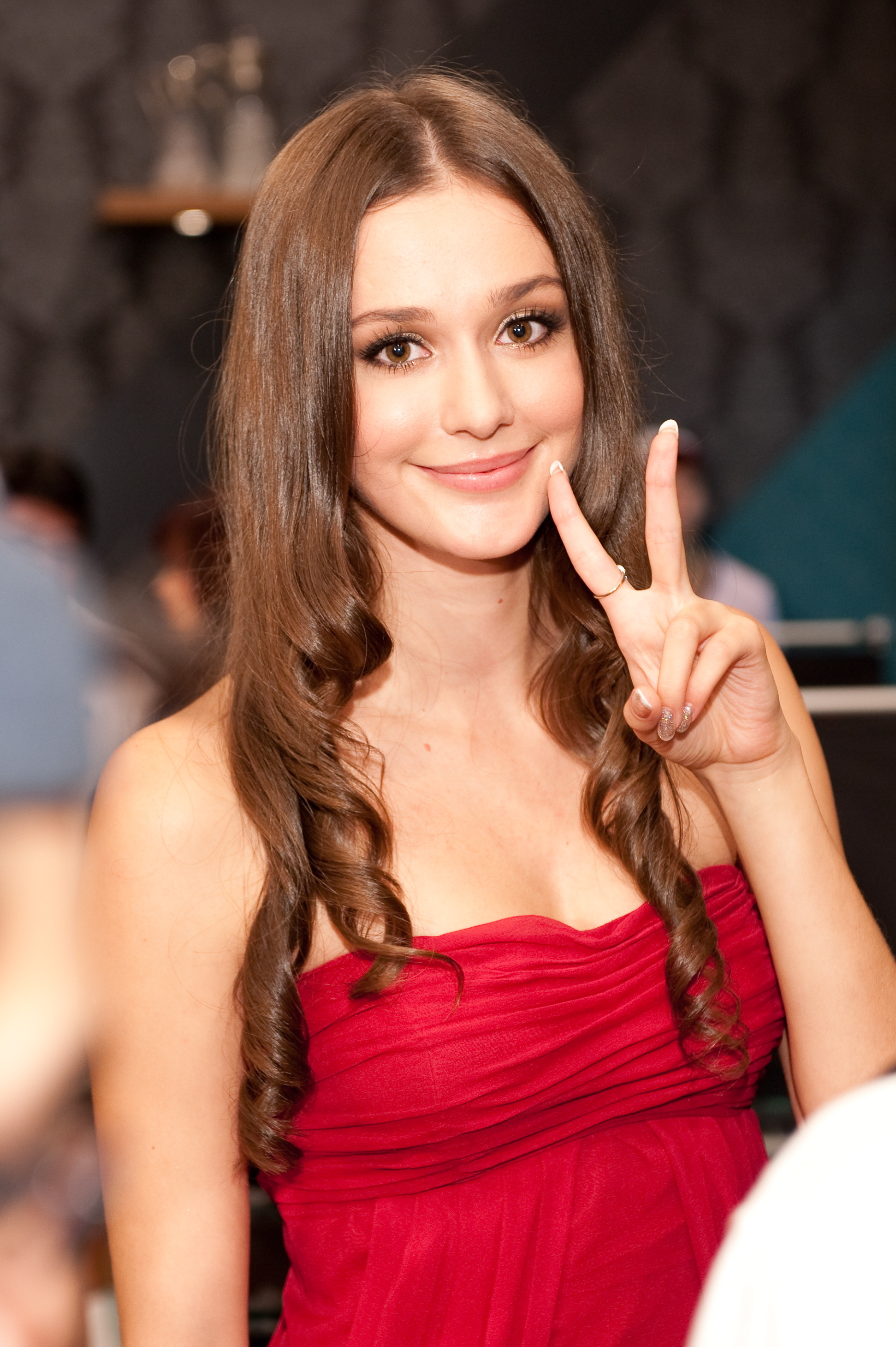

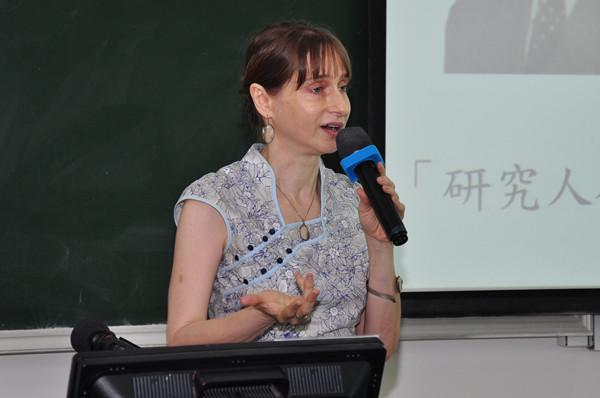

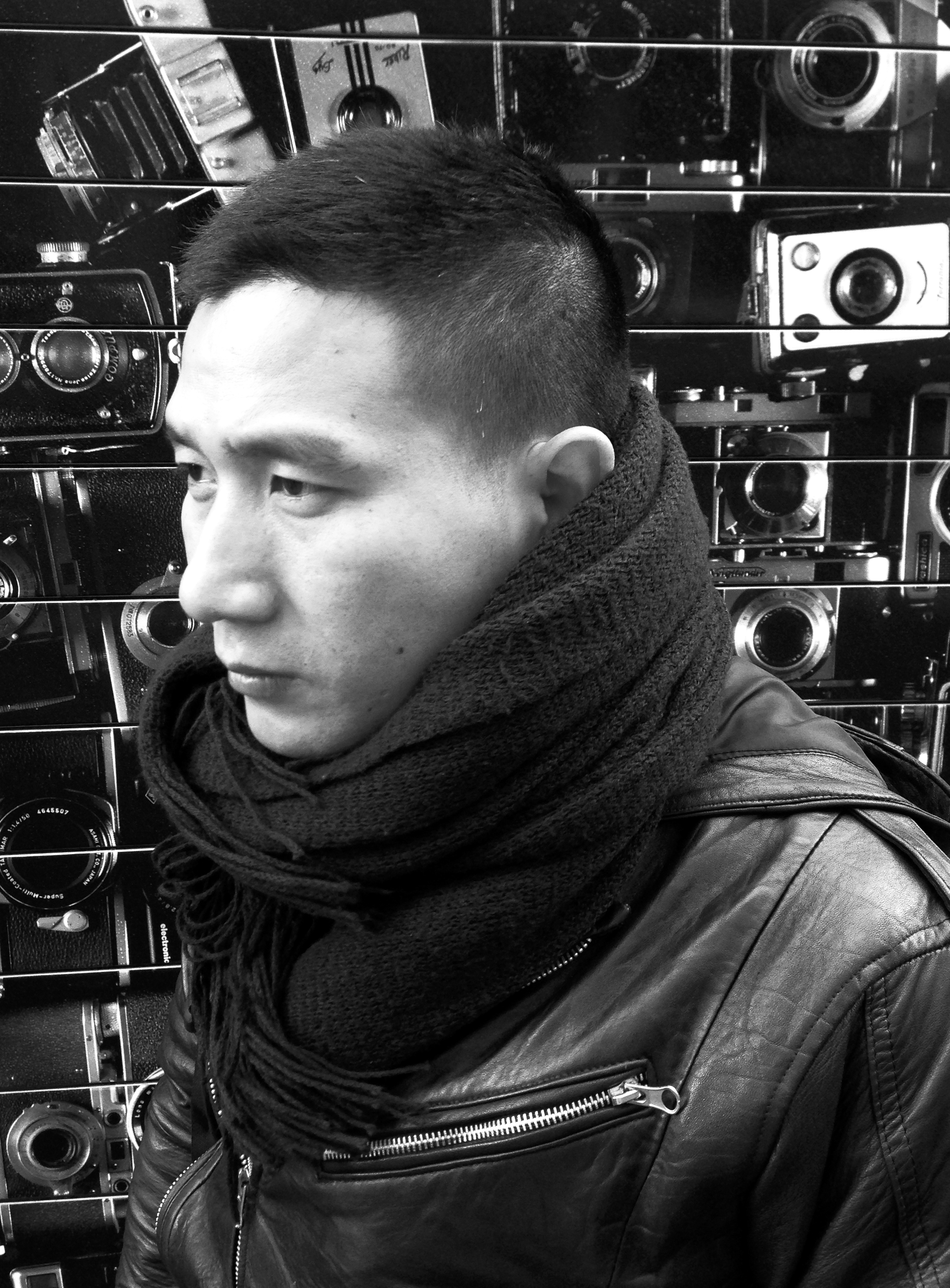

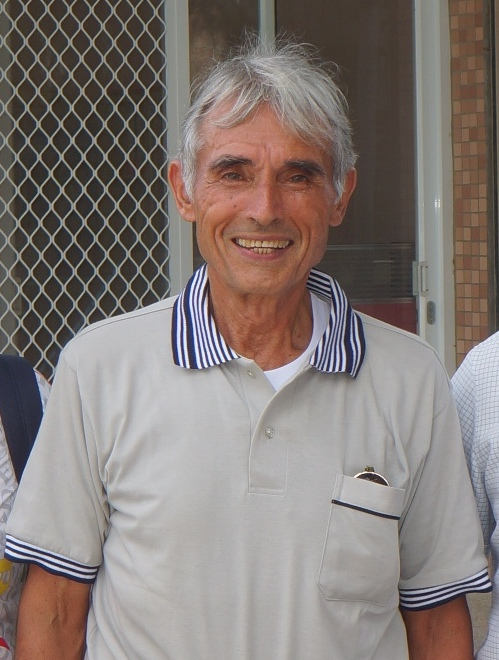

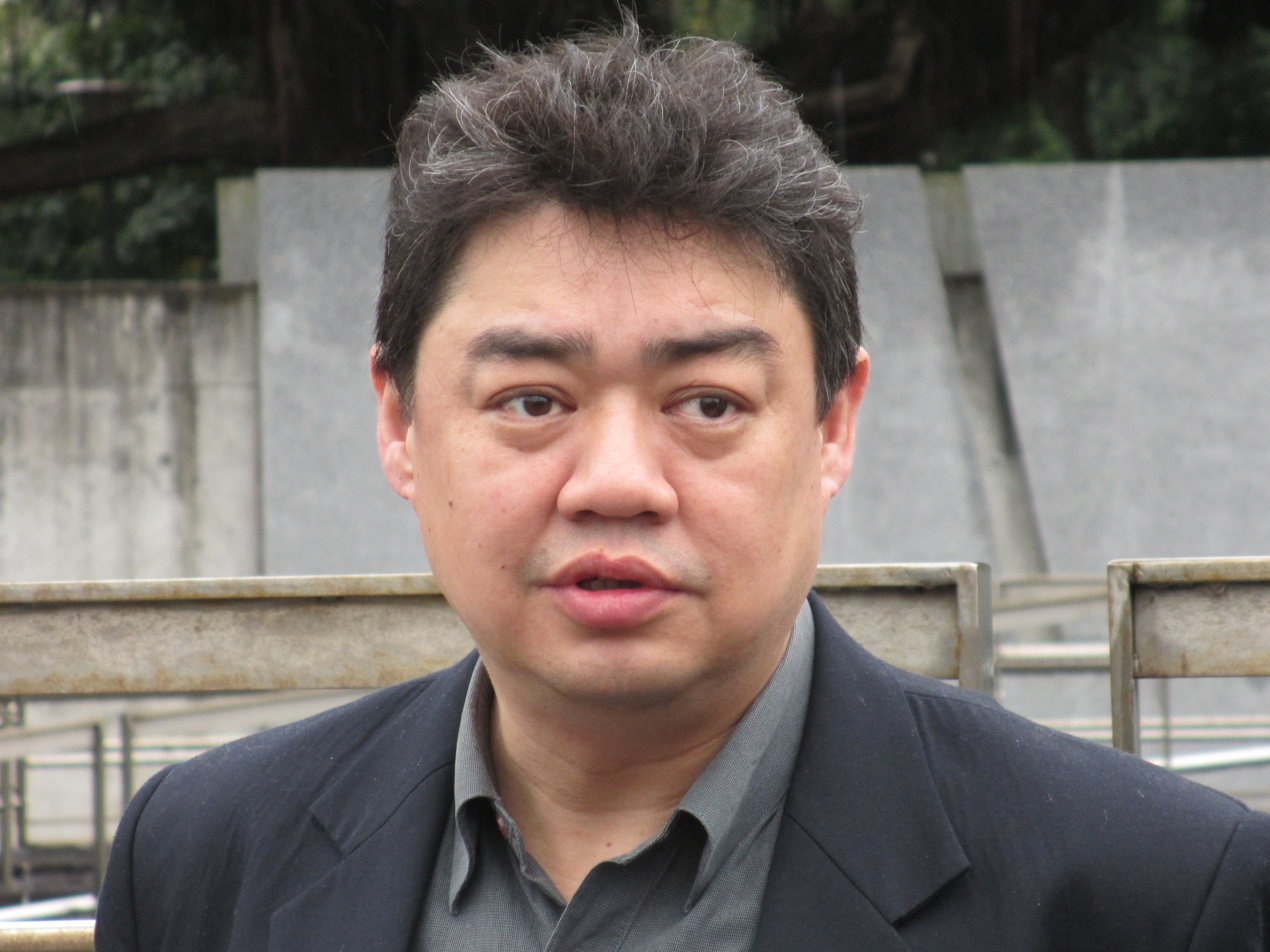
Larisa Bakurova	Olga Gorodetskaya	Midi Z	Liu Yifeng
Wu'erkaixi

Total population
- Approximately 563,515 people (October 2020)

Taiwanese new immigrants is one of the major categories of Taiwanese ethnic groups. According to the definition of the Ministry of the Interior's Immigration Agency, it refers to people who settled in Taiwan after January 1987 due to marriage or immigration, especially those who have obtained Republic of China nationality through naturalization, and covers a diverse ethnic background.

In July 2024, the New Immigrants Basic Act was passed by the Legislative Yuan. Amendments supporting the establishment of an agency to support new immigrants were passed in November 2025.
