= Hsinchu City Government =

Government of Hsinchu City, Taiwan

Coordinates: 24.8067°N 120.9688°E

- 新竹市政府

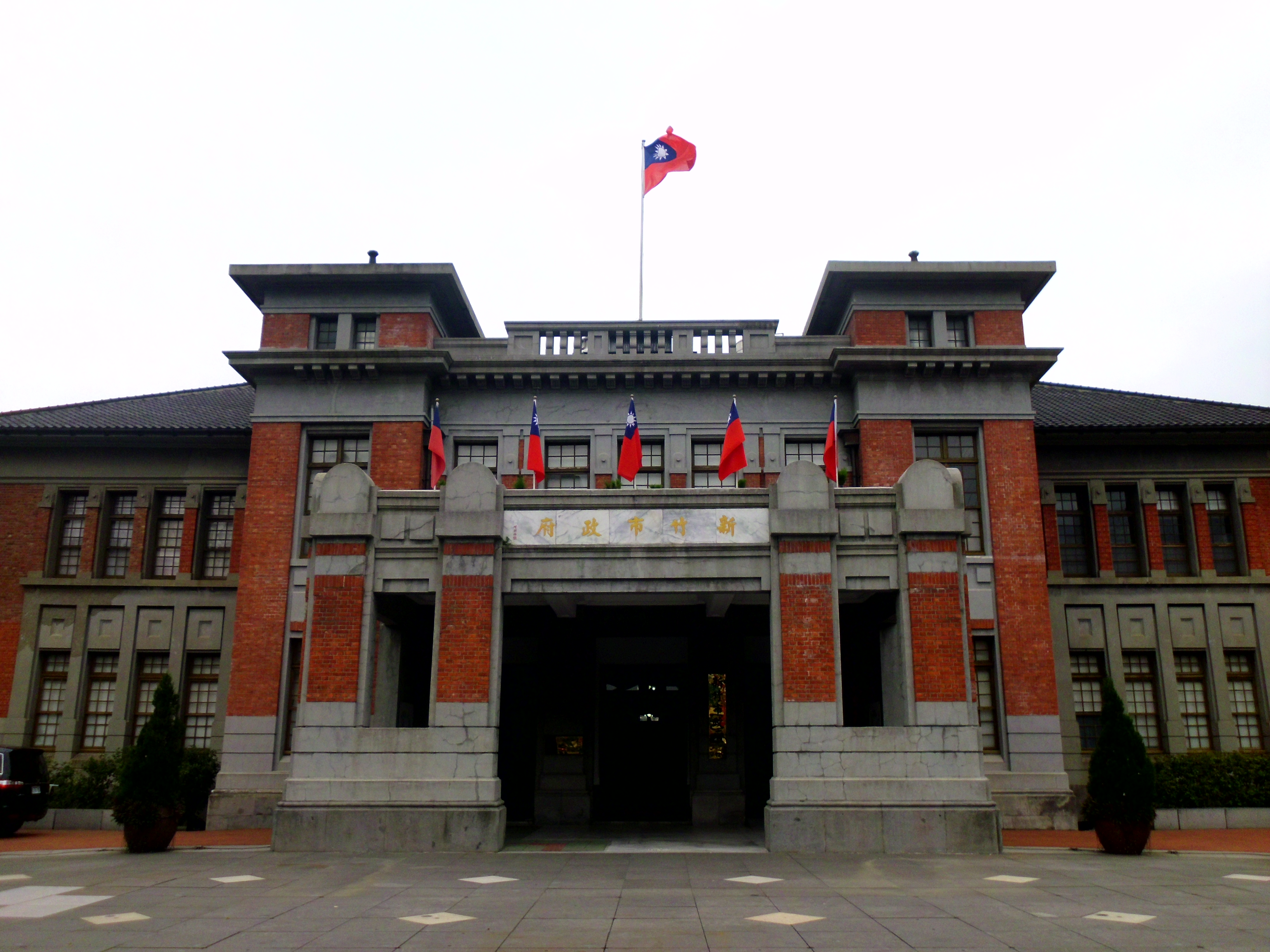

Provincial city government overview
- Jurisdiction: Hsinchu City
- Headquarters: North District
- Provincial city government executive: Andy Chiu, Mayor
- Website: Official website

The Hsinchu City Government (HCCG; Chinese: 新竹市政府; pinyin: Xīnzhú Shì Zhèngfǔ) is the municipal government of Hsinchu City, Taiwan.

== History ==
After the handover of Taiwan from Japan to the Republic of China in October 1945, the Hsinchu Prefecture Caretaker Commission was established on 9 November the same year. On 17 November 1945, the commission was renamed Hsinchu Municipal Hall and subsequently was succeeded by Hsinchu City Government. The city government moved to the former prefectural administration offices. In 1955, the city government moved again from the former East District Office on Zhongzheng Road to the former high school on Linsen Road.

== Organization ==
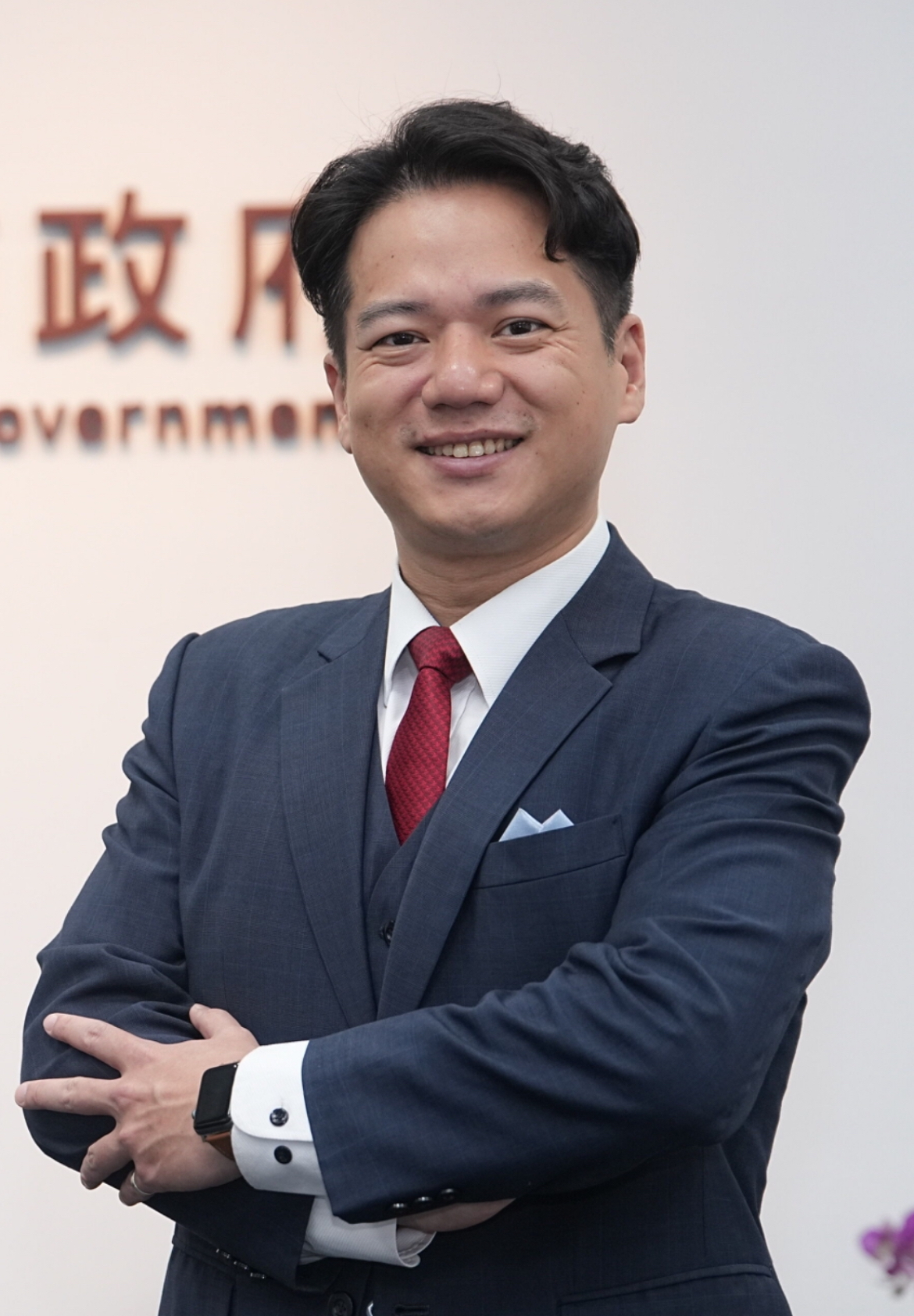
Andy Chiu, acting Mayor of Hsinchu City

=== Government's Departments and Highest-Level Affiliated Institutions ===
- Department of Civil Affairs
- Department of Finance
- Department of Economic Development
- Department of Education
- Department of Public Works
- Department of Transportation
- Department of Urban Development
- Department of Social Affairs
- Department of Labor Affairs
- Department of Land administration
- Department of General Affairs
- Department of City Marketing
- Department of Personnel
- Department of Budget, Accounting and Statistics
- Department of Civil Service Ethics
- Police Bureau
- Public Health Bureau
- Local Tax Bureau
- Environmental Protection Bureau
- Fire Bureau
- Cultural Affairs Bureau

=== District Offices, Subsidiary and Affiliated Institutions ===
- East District Office
- North District Office
- Xiangshan District Office
- East District Household Registration Office
- North District Household Registration Office
- Xiangshan District Household Registration Office
- East District Public Health Center
- North District Public Health Center
- Xiangshan District Public Health Center
- Land Office
- Mortuary Services Office
- Family Education Center
- Zoo
- Stadium

== Access ==
The city hall is accessible within walking distance north west from Hsinchu Station of Taiwan Railway.

== See also ==
- Hsinchu City Council
