= Jang Chyi-lu =

Taiwanese economist and politician

Jang Chyi-lu MLY
- 張其祿
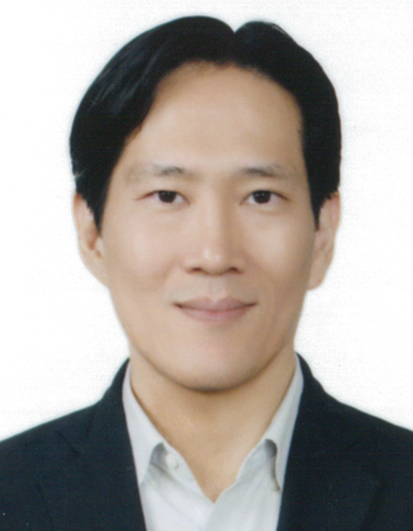
- Official portrait, 2020

Member of the Legislative Yuan
- In office 1 February 2020 – 31 January 2024
- Constituency: Party-list

Personal details
- Born: 28 March 1968 (age 58) Taoyuan, Taiwan
- Party: Taiwan People's Party
- Education: National Taipei University (BA, MA); University of Southern California (PhD)

Jang Chyi-lu (Chinese: 張其祿; born 28 March 1968) is a Taiwanese politician and former scholar of public administration.

== Early life and education ==
Jang was born on 28 March 1968 in Taoyuan, Taiwan, to Hung-sheng and Jang Lee-chi. He graduated from National Taipei University with a bachelor's degree and master's degree in public administration, then completed doctoral studies in the United States at the University of Southern California, where he earned his Ph.D. in public administration from the Sol Price School of Public Policy in 2000. His doctoral dissertation was titled, "Occupational licensing in the new health care environment: An integrated framework and empirical analysis".

== Career ==
Jang was the dean of the College of Social Sciences at National Sun Yat-sen University and a professor of political economy before contesting the 2020 Taiwanese legislative election.

Jang was ranked second on the proportional representation party list of the Taiwan People's Party following an open audition. During the campaign, he helped present the TPP's political positions in debates. Jang secured a seat on the Legislative Yuan after the Taiwan People's Party won over 11% of the party list vote on 11 January 2020. After stepping down from the Legislative Yuan, Jang returned to his political economy professorship at National Sun Yat-sen University.
