= Taiwan People's Party =

Taiwanese political party established in 2019

Taiwan People's Party 台灣民眾黨
- Abbreviation: TPP
- Chairman: Huang Kuo-chang
- Secretary-General: Vincent Chou
- Founder: Ko Wen-je
- Founded: 6 August 2019
- Membership (2023): ▲32,500
- Ideology: Civic nationalism; Social liberalism; Populism; Catch-all party
- Political position: Centre-left
- Colours: Cyan; White
- Legislative Yuan: 8 / 113
- Municipal mayors: 0 / 6
- Magistrates/mayors: 1 / 16
- Councillors: 15 / 910
- Township/city mayors: 0 / 204

Website
- tpp.org.tw

Taiwan People's Party

YouTube information
- Channel: 民眾之聲
- Years active: 2019–present
- Subscribers: 391 thousand
- Views: 184.9 million
- Last updated: August 29, 2025

Taiwan People's Party
- Traditional Chinese: 台灣民眾黨
- Simplified Chinese: 台湾民众党
Transcriptions
Standard Mandarin
- Hanyu Pinyin: Táiwān Mínzhòngdǎng
- Bopomofo: ㄊㄞˊ ㄨㄢ ㄇㄧㄣˊ ㄓㄨㄥˋ ㄉㄤˇ
- Gwoyeu Romatzyh: Tairuan Minjonqdaang
- Wade–Giles: Tʻai^{2}-wan^{1} Min^{2}-chung^{4}-tang^{3}
- Tongyong Pinyin: Táiwan Mín-jhòng-dǎng
- MPS2: Tái-wān Mín-jùng-dǎng
- IPA: [tʰǎɪ.wán mǐn.ʈʂʊ̂ŋ.tàŋ]
Hakka
- Romanization: Toi-Van Min Zung Dong
Southern Min
- Hokkien POJ: Tâi-oân Bîn-chiòng Tóng
- Tâi-lô: Tâi-uân Bîn-tsiòng Tóng

The Taiwan People's Party (TPP) is a centre-left political party in Taiwan. It was formally established on 6 August 2019 by Ko Wen-je, who served as its first chairman. The party considers itself as an alternative third party to both the Democratic Progressive Party and the Kuomintang.

== History ==
=== Founding ===
On 1 August 2019, Mayor of Taipei Ko Wen-je announced a new political party. He said that the Taiwan People's Party (TPP) seeks to "become an alternative" to both the Pan-Green Coalition headed by the Democratic Progressive Party (DPP) and the Kuomintang (KMT)-influenced Pan-Blue Coalition.

At a preliminary meeting on 6 August, Ko was elected chairman of the party. As required by the Ministry of the Interior, the Taiwan People's Party conducted its founding assembly at the National Taiwan University Hospital International Convention Center later that day. It was Ko's 60th birthday. Seventy-two of the 111 founding party members were in attendance. The TPP charter permits party members to hold membership status in other political parties. Many early party members worked for the Taipei City Government or for Ko. Among the TPP's first members were politicians formerly affiliated with the DPP and the KMT, as well as a number of political independents.

The TPP shares a Chinese-language name with Japanese-colonial era political activist Chiang Wei-shui's now defunct Taiwanese People's Party, just with an alternate character for “tái”. (Ko’s party uses “台” while Chiang’s party used “臺”, though this difference is often negligible to native Taiwanese.) The Chiang Wei-shui Cultural Foundation panned the name of Ko's new party, stating that it might cause confusion. In response, Ko said that he preferred to retain the name unless it was illegal.

=== 2020 elections ===
Ko stated that the Taiwan People's Party (TPP) would contest the 2020 legislative election, but that he would not mount an independent bid in the presidential election. He later said that the TPP would nominate a full slate of 34 at-large legislative candidates. Political scientist Liao Da-chi opined that Ko's Taiwan People's Party would take more votes from supporters of the Democratic Progressive Party in the 2020 election. The TPP nominated its first eight candidates for single-member constituencies on 22 September 2019. During a second round of legislative nominations on 20 October 2019, Ko stated that the TPP sought to prevent a single political party from winning a legislative majority. The TPP described this tactic as "pushing the pan-blue and pan-green camps to the side to allow for the people to be in the center." In November 2019, the TPP announced a party list of 29 at-large legislative candidates. In December 2019, the TPP's political goals grew in scale, as Ko stated that the party aimed to be the largest represented in the Legislative Yuan. The TPP won five at-large seats in the 2020 legislative election, becoming the third largest party in the legislature.

==== 2020 Kaohsiung mayoral by-election ====
Wu Yi-jheng of the TPP ran in the 2020 Kaohsiung mayoral by-election. However, he finished with only 4.06% of the vote, a distant third to Chen Chi-mai of the DPP (70.03%) and Li Mei-jhen of the KMT (25.90%).

=== 2024 elections ===
The Taiwan People's Party nominated Ko to run in the 2024 presidential election and contested the legislative election. There were efforts to run a joint opposition ticket in the presidential race with the KMT's Hou Yu-ih, but talks ultimately collapsed. Ko nominated Cynthia Wu, an at-large legislator and businesswoman who served in the 10th Legislative Yuan, as his running mate on 24 November. The TPP nominated the maximum number of 34 at-large legislative candidates and 10 legislative candidates for single-member constituencies, concentrated mostly in northern Taiwan. Ko championed himself as a "middle road" between the KMT and the DPP, attracting young voters who were dissatisfied with the "big two parties". According to The Diplomat, there is a shift recently in political stance closer to Pan-Blue than to initially Pan-Green. On the other hand, Time and CNN observe the party as remaining centrist, positioning itself as a stark contrast to both the KMT and the DPP.

Ko received 26.46% of the popular vote in the presidential election, placing in third place. The TPP won eight at-large legislative seats, gaining three seats in total. It was the TPP's greatest electoral result since its inception, preventing both the KMT and the DPP from obtaining a legislative majority.

=== Resignation of Ko Wen-je ===
In September 2024, Ko was detained on allegations of corruption during his time as mayor of Taipei and misreporting campaign finances during the 2024 presidential election. He was indicted in December 2024. He handed in his resignation the same month, and he was replaced by Huang Kuo-chang on 1 January 2025.

== Policy and platform ==
Taiwan People's Party is a centre-left political party. The party supports economic policies that are more left-leaning than the Kuomintang (KMT) and the Democratic Progressive Party (DPP). The TPP is also referred to as centrist or liberal because of its neutral and civic nationalist stance between the pro-unification KMT and the pro-independence DPP.

The policy from the TPP mainly manifests itself in its anti-establishment view and pushing their economic agenda which mainly attacks the DPP and KMT about low wages, unemployment, and the cost of living. In China, the TPP professes to be neutral and pro-status quo.

Their core values include:

- Safeguarding vulnerable populations
- Achieving net zero carbon emissions by 2050
- Ensuring affordable housing
- Financial discipline
- Pragmatism and preparedness in relation to cross-strait relations

== Symbols and organisation ==
The party charter states that the party's formal abbreviated name in Chinese is 民眾黨; Mínzhòngdǎng. The party colors are turquoise and white. The first signifies an end to the longtime blue–green political divide in Taiwan. The color white represents the "white force" of Ko's allies, a group that supports open and transparent government.

In 2023, the Taiwan New Homeland Think Tank Association was established as a TPP-affiliated think tank.

While public opinion of Ko suffered due to corruption investigations, the TPP as a whole experienced only a minor decline in support in September 2024.

== Election results ==
=== Presidential elections ===
Election	Candidate	Running mate	Total votes	Share of votes	Outcome
2024	Ko Wen-je	Cynthia Wu	3,690,466	26.46%	Defeated

=== Legislative elections ===
Election	Total seats won	Total votes	Share of votes	Changes	Party leader	Status	President
2020	5 / 113	1,588,806	11.22%		Ko Wen-je	3rd Party	Tsai Ing-wen
2024	8 / 113	3,040,334	22.07%	▲3 seats	Ko Wen-je	3rd Party	Lai Ching-te

=== Local elections ===
Election	Magistrates and mayors	Councillors	Township/city mayors	Township/city council representatives	Village chiefs	Party leader
2022 unified	2 / 22	14 / 910	0 / 204	9 / 2,139	3 / 7,748	Ko Wen-je

== Chairmanship ==
A list of chairpersons since 2019.

Portrait	Chairperson	Took office	Left office
	Ko Wen-je	6 August 2019	1 January 2025
	Huang Kuo-chang	1 January 2025 (Note: Acting chairperson until by-election on 15 February 2025.)	Incumbent

== Notable members ==
- Ko Wen-je, former mayor of Taipei, founding chairman of the Taiwan People's Party.
- Tsai Pi-ru, Taichung City Government consultant, former chief of staff of Taipei, former member of Legislative Yuan.
- Huang Shan-shan, member of Legislative Yuan, former deputy mayor of Taipei.
- Ann Kao, former member of Legislative Yuan, mayor of Hsinchu.
- Chen Fu-hai, magistrate of Kinmen County.
- Huang Kuo-chang, caucus leader in the Legislative Yuan, former executive leader of the New Power Party.
- Andy Chiu, deputy mayor of Hsinchu, former caucus leader in the Legislative Yuan.
- Jang Chyi-lu, an economist, former member of Legislative Yuan.
- Tsai Ping-kun, former deputy mayor of Taipei.
- Hsieh Li-kung, former director-general of the National Immigration Agency, left the Kuomintang for the Taiwan People's Party on 31 May 2020.
- Chen Wan-hui, former member of Legislative Yuan.
- Cynthia Wu, Shin Kong Group heiress, former member of Legislative Yuan and vice-presidential candidate.
- Wu Yi-jheng, former Kaohsiung city councillor and 2020 Kaohsiung mayoral by-election candidate.
- Huang Ching-yin, former deputy spokesperson for the Taipei City Government Secretariat, Taipei City Councillor, Taipei City Constituency I.
- Mạch Ngọc Trân, Taiwan’s first Vietnamese member of Legislative Yuan.
- Li Zhenxiu, Taiwan's first member of the Legislative Yuan who is a mainland Chinese spouse.
