= Savungaz Valincinan =

Taiwanese indigenous activist (born 1987)

- Born: Li³ P'in³-han²; 5 April 1987 (age 39); Taipei, Taiwan
- Education: National Cheng Kung University (BS); National Dong Hwa University (LLM)
- Occupations: Cafe owner, television host, politician, Indigenous rights activist
- Political party: Independent
- Other political affiliations: Democratic Progressive Party (formerly)
- Movement: Sunflower Student Movement

Savungaz Valincinan (Note: Bunun: [savungað valint͡ɕinan]) (born 5 April 1987) is a Taiwanese indigenous activist, politician, and television host. She is a member of the Bunun people. She is the owner of Lumaq cafe in Taipei, and served as the host for the fourth season of the Taiwan Indigenous Television program Lima Help. She ran for political office during the 2024 Taiwanese legislative election for the Highland Aborigine Constituency.

As an activist, Savungaz was active in the Sunflower Student Movement as well as in campaigns against the construction of a nuclear waste facility on Orchid Island, the Indigenous name rectification movement, protests against the development of the Taitung Miramar Resort, as well as protests in support of the Bunun hunter Tama Talum. She served as the general convener of the Indigenous Youth Front as well as the secretary-general of the Association for Taiwan Indigenous Peoples' Policies (ATIPP).

== Name ==
Savungaz used the Han name Li Pinhan (Chinese: 李品涵; pinyin: Lǐ Pǐnhán; Wade–Giles: Li³ P'in³-han²) prior to exclusively using her Bunun name. Her Bunun-language name is Savungaz Valincinan; Bunun uses the Latin script. It is transliterated as 撒丰安·瓦林及那 (pinyin: Sāfēngān Wǎlínjínà; Zhuyin Fuhao: ㄙㄚㄈㄥㄢ ㄨㄚˇㄌㄧㄣˊㄐㄧˊㄋㄚˋ) using Chinese characters. Because "Sa" is the first syllable of this transliteration, she is often erroneously referred to as "Miss Sa" (pinyin: Sā xiǎojiě). (Note: Chinese speakers mistake the three-character 撒丰安 "Savungaz" as a three-character full name, with 撒 "Sa" as her surname (xìngshì; 姓氏). With the remainder, 丰安 "Vungaz", being her given name, (míng; 名). Her given name, written in Chinese, would be perceived as Sa Feng-an to those unfamiliar with Taiwanese Indigenous names.) Savungaz argues that the usage of Chinese characters fails to correctly express the popular pronunciation of the traditional names of Indigenous Taiwanese people, with the meaning of Chinese characters leading to the misuse and misunderstanding of their names. According to Bunun naming systems, the child takes the name of the family elder, which in her case was her grandmother.

To protest the Taiwanese government's mandatory usage of Chinese characters for Indigenous Taiwanese names, (Note: The Formosan languages are written with Latin characters, which activists argue preserve the original pronunciation and allow for the proper transfer of oral histories. For Indigenous Taiwanese names on official documents, three options are offered: Traditional names transliterated with Chinese characters, Traditional names transliterated with Chinese characters with Latin characters underneath, or a Han Chinese name with Latin characters underneath.) Savungaz changed her legal name to the 34-character Lee I want to exclusively list my tribal name, my Bunun tribal name is Savungaz Valincinan (Chinese: 李我要單列族名我的布農族名字是Savungaz Valincinan; pinyin: Lǐ wǒ yào dānliè zú míng wǒ de Bùnóng zú míngzì shì Savungaz Valincinan). This name was mocked on The Night Night Show with Hello by its host Hello Hor, who called it "trash" for being long and difficult to pronounce. The show's producer later apologized to Savungaz.

In 2026, Savungaz changed her legal name to "Savungaz Balincinan". According to Savungaz, "Balincinan" is closer to the pronunciation than "Valincinan".

== Early life and education ==
Savungaz was born to a Han Chinese father and a mother from the Bunun tribe of Indigenous Taiwanese people. She was raised in the city of Taipei and embraced her Bunun heritage later in life, returning to the tribe's homeland during holidays with her mother. Growing up, she faced anti-Indigenous discrimination from authority figures and her peers.

Savungaz primarily used her Han Chinese name until high school, when she stopped partly to access welfare benefits for Indigenous students during a time when her family was struggling with financial issues. Additionally, she changed her name to reflect her maternal Bunun ancestry starting in university. Savungaz cited the Taiwanese education system's lack of inclusion of Indigenous topics over a goal of producing model Han Chinese students led to a lack of Indigenous perspectives in her education as she was growing up. The same change in ethnic identification was considered for Savungaz's brothers, but her father's parents threatened to disown the family if the sons identified as Bunun tribesmen rather than as Han Chinese.

Savungaz studied in the Department of Aeronautics and Astronautics at National Cheng Kung University (NCKU). In 2011, Savungaz and a Truku student established an Indigenous student club at NCKU. Savungaz also studied in the master's program in law at National Dong Hwa University's College of Humanities and Social Sciences.

== Career ==
Savungaz first began working at an Indigenous non-governmental organization, the Millet Foundation (Chinese: 小米穗原住民文化基金會) and worked as an intern for Legislative Yuan member Tien Chiu-chin. She was formerly active in the Democratic Progressive Party as a member of its Central Committee and in the Department of Aboriginal Affairs.

Savungaz runs a cafe in the city of Taipei called Lumaq, translating to "home" in the Bunun language.

She served as the host of the fourth season of the Taiwan Indigenous Television program Lima Help (Chinese: Lima幫幫忙), alongside American actor Justin Caleb Cooper (Chinese: 賈斯汀).

=== Activism ===
Savungaz is a member of the Indigenous Youth Front (Chinese: 原住民族青年陣線) and served as its general convener. She formerly served as the secretary-general of the Association for Taiwan Indigenous Peoples' Policies (ATIPP; Chinese: 台灣原住民族政策協會). Having been an activist for a decade, Savungaz was active in movements such as the protests against the construction of the Low-Level Radioactive Waste Storage Site on Orchid Island, Indigenous name rectification movement, the protests calling for the pardoning of Indigenous hunter Tama Talum, and the 2012 protests against the development of the Taitung Miramar Resort on Amis land.

As an activist during the 2014 Sunflower Student Movement and the 21-day occupation of the Legislative Yuan building, Savungaz aided in the assembly of the Aboriginal Youth Forum (Chinese: 原青論壇) held by various Indigenous student organizations.

For her participation in the 411 siege of the Zhongzheng First Precinct, Taipei City Police Department, Savungaz was charged with 40 days in prison, with a suspended sentence of two years, in addition to protective control and 40 hours of legal education. The final charge was added onto her sentence when Savungaz laughed during court proceedings which the presiding judge deemed was a lack of respect for court order.

She was among the protesters during the 2020 Black Lives Matter protests in Taiwan, connecting the challenges faced by African Americans in the United States with the discrimination faced by Indigenous Taiwanese.

Savungaz was among the 2021 activists who called on local governments to recognize the exclusive writing of Indigenous Taiwanese names in Latin script. Activists argued that the script better adhered to the pronunciation and served as a method for the preservation of Indigenous Taiwanese languages. The Ministry of the Interior rejected a petition calling for such on the grounds that Taiwanese people would be unable to read the names properly.

=== Political career ===
Savungaz ran in the Highland Aborigine Constituency in the Legislative Yuan ahead of the 2024 Taiwanese legislative election as an independent candidate with a three-member team. Savungaz ran on the platform "Land, name rectification, self-regulation" (Chinese: 土地、正名、自治), a slogan that was used prominently in previous campaigns regarding Indigenous Taiwanese rights. Savungaz was critical of the Council of Indigenous Peoples' role as what she described as a conduit for the Democratic Progressive Party led government rather than as a genuine advocate for Indigenous peoples. She supported the Siraya people's campaign for official recognition by the Taiwanese government. Being 36 at the time of the election, she was the youngest candidate running for the position, with all her other competitors being above fifty years of age.

Savungaz campaigned for the right for Indigenous Taiwanese people to exclusively list their names in their respective languages on government issued IDs. In October 2023, she called for the passage of anti-discrimination legislation, citing discrimination caused by perceptions of Indigenous Taiwanese people as alcoholic, lazy, lascivious, as well as having received unfair benefits as a result of affirmative action and governmental aid. Savungaz called for reforms towards the Taiwanese education system as a means to address anti-Indigenous discrimination, as well as prohibitions on the use of racist language on social media following racially motivated harassment targeted towards her on social media.

Savungaz called for the official delineation of traditional territory, the ancestral lands traditionally inhabited and utilized by Indigenous peoples, as well as the self-regulation of said traditional territories. She campaigned on the improvement of rights regarding hunting and land.

She was ultimately not successful in her bid, receiving 6,840 votes and failing to retain her deposit.

== Bibliography ==
- 2016: 政治工作在幹嘛?: 一群年輕世代的歷險告白 (What is Politics, Really?) ISBN 9789862137215

== Electoral history ==
Legislative Election 2024: Highland Aborigine Constituency
Party	Candidate	Votes	%	±%
Independent	Kao Chin Su-mei	37,131	25.75	
DPP	Wu Li-hua	31,874	22.10	
KMT	Lu Hsien-yi	22,284	15.45	
KMT	Kung Wen-chi	21,304	14.77	
Independent	Zhang Zi Xiao	11,726	8.13	
Independent	Savungaz Valincinan	6,840	4.74	
Independent	Lin Shi Wei	6,331	4.39	
TPP	Hu Huang Guang Wen	6,143	4.26	
Judicial Reform Party	Kao Wan Hsin	351	0.24	
Independent	Lin Kuo	230	0.16	
Total valid votes		144,214		
Independent hold		Swing		
DPP hold		Swing		
KMT hold		Swing		
