= Kao Chin Su-mei =

Taiwanese politician and retired actress and singer

Kao Chin Su-mei MLY
- 高金素梅
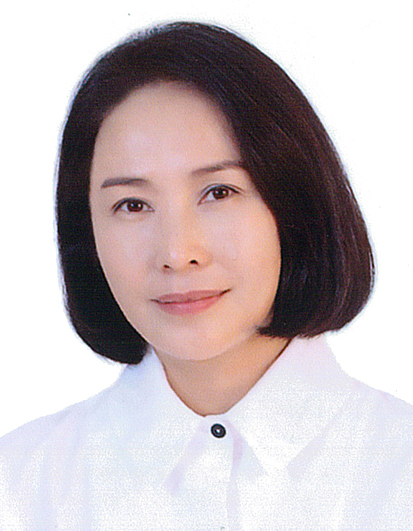

Member of the Legislative Yuan
- Incumbent
- Assumed office 1 February 2002
- Preceded by: Kao Yang-sheng
- Constituency: Highland Aborigines

Personal details
- Born: Chin Su-mei; 21 September 1965 (age 61) Heping, Taichung County, Taiwan
- Party: Independent (2001–2004; 2019–present)
- Other political affiliations: Non-Partisan Solidarity Union (2004–present)
- Domestic partner(s): Kenny Ho (1989–1993); Xu Zhiyuan (2010–2013)
- Education: Minzu University of China (BA)
- Other names: Ciwas Ali; May Chin

Kao Chin Su-mei
- Chinese: 高金素梅
Transcriptions
Standard Mandarin
- Hanyu Pinyin: Gāo Jīn Sùméi
- Wade–Giles: Kao Chin Su-mei

Ciwas Ali
- Traditional Chinese: 吉娃斯·阿麗
- Simplified Chinese: 吉娃斯·阿丽
Transcriptions
Standard Mandarin
- Hanyu Pinyin: Jíwásī Ālì
- Wade–Giles: Chi-wa-ssu A-li

Kao Chin Su-mei (Chinese: 高金素梅; pinyin: Gāo Jīn Sùméi; born September 21, 1965), also known as May Chin and Ciwas Ali, is a Taiwanese politician and retired actress and singer. She is of Manchu and Atayal descent.

In the 1980s and 1990s, she starred in several popular TV series and films, including Ang Lee's The Wedding Banquet (1993). She also released several Mandopop albums. She retired from show business in 1999 following her diagnosis of liver cancer which she recovered from.

Kao Chin was elected as member of the Legislative Yuan in December 2001, and has secured reelection in the Highland Aborigines constituency, most recently in 2020. Affiliated with the pan-Blue Coalition, she is currently the Non-Partisan Solidarity Union's only member in the Legislative Yuan.

== Early life and education ==
Chin Su-mei was born in Heping Township, Taichung County (present day part of Taichung City), Taiwan. Her father was an ethnic Manchu from mainland China. In the mid-1980s, she stood for election to be a representative of Taiwanese Aborigines within the Legislative Yuan, during which she took on the Chinese surname of her Taiwanese Aborigine mother, hence becoming Kao Chin Su-mei. Her Atayal name is Ciwas Ali and May Chin remains her stage name.

After high school, Chin went to China and graduated from the Minzu University of China with a bachelor's degree in ethnology.

Chin also released at least 8 Mandopop albums and appeared in various local commercials. Besides acting, May Chin ran a wedding photography service shop in Taipei during the mid-1990s. However, the shop burned down in 1996, claiming six lives.

== Political career ==
Since entering the Legislative Yuan after elected in the 2001 Taiwanese legislative election, Kao Chin has been noted for her outspoken views, traditional Atayal costume and face paint in the shape of traditional Atayal tattoo work reserved for married women.

On 19 August 2009, Kao Chin met with the General Secretary of the Chinese Communist Party, Hu Jintao. At the meeting, General Secretary Hu expressed his deep sorrow and condolences for the typhoon victims in Taiwan to an actor-turned-politician Kao who led a delegation of her fellow ethnic minorities in Taiwan to visit the mainland. Hu added that "People on both sides of the Taiwan Strait are of one family and Chinese people have a long tradition of lending a hand to those in danger and difficulties."

On 8 June 2026, Kao Chin was officially indicted in a corruption case. According to the Taipei District Prosecutors Office, she fraudulently obtained more than NT$7.87 million (US$249,377) in public funds through false claims for legislative assistant salaries, overtime pay, bonuses and childcare subsidies.

== Personal life ==
Chin was once in a relationship with Hong Kong actor Kenny Ho whom she first met on the set of the Taiwanese drama Endless Love in 1989. They later separated in 1993 and still remain good friends. Chin and Ho agreed that if they are still single by the age of 60, they would spend the rest of their lives together.

In 2006, Next Magazine uncovered her long-lasting extramarital affair with the Minister of the Interior Lee Hong-yuan between mid-2000s and early 2010s.

In 2011 she entered into a relationship with a renowned Taiwanese journalist and writer Xu Zhiyuan. They later broke up in 2013 but still remain good friends.

== Filmography ==
=== Films ===
Year	English title	Chinese title	Role	Notes
1987	May Jane	梅珍	May Jane	
1988	Hero of Tomorrow	江湖接班人	Yeung Lai-ling	
1988	Human, Sentiment, Law	情與法		
1993	The Wedding Banquet	喜宴	Gu Weiwei	
1993	Magic Sword	將邪神劍	Mo Ye	
1999	Woman Soup	女湯	Faye	

=== Television ===
Year	English title	Chinese title	Role	Notes
1987	Porters	挑伕	Yu'er	
1989	Endless Love	不了情	Zeng Jiayu	
1990	Wan-chun	婉君	Yanhong	
1990	Three Flowers	三朵花	Zhang Nianchen	
1990	Love	愛	Ding Yuenü	
1992	Fate	緣	Ding Yuenü	sequel of Love
1993	Terracotta Warriors	秦俑	Fan Dong'er	
1999	The Mute and the Bride	啞巴與新娘	Xu Huimei	only first few episodes due to cancer diagnosis

== Electoral history ==
No.	Candidate	Party	Votes	Ratio	Elected
2001 (5th)
1	Kao Chin Su-mei	Independent	8,909	10.42%	Yes
2	Lee Wen-lai (李文來)	People First Party	8,259	9.66%	
3	Ho Hsin-chun (何信軍)	Kuomintang	8,530	9.97%	
4	Yu Meng-tyieh (余夢蝶)	Democratic Progressive Party	5,132	6.00%	
5	Yisao Ludao (伊掃·魯刀)	Independent	790	0.92%	
6	Chuan Wen-sheng	Kuomintang	6,318	7.39%	
7	Walis Perin	Taiwan Number One Party	9,194	10.75%	Yes
8	Kao Yang-sheng	Kuomintang	7,104	8.31%	
9	Lin Wen-sheng (林文生)	Taiwan Solidarity Union	4,092	4.78%	
10	Lin Chun-te	People First Party	8,647	10.11%	Yes
11	Payen Talu	Democratic Progressive Party	4,567	5.34%	
12	Tseng Hua-te (曾華德)	Kuomintang	13,982	16.35%	Yes
2004 (6th)
1	Walis Perin	Non-Partisan Solidarity Union	9,415	11.54%	
2	Tseng Hua-te	Kuomintang	13,536	16.59%	Yes
3	Lee Hsiu-chin (李秀琴)	Independent	216	0.26%	
4	Wu Hsin-kuo (伍新國)	Independent	3,145	3.85%	
5	Kao Chin Su-mei	Independent	16,284	19.96%	Yes
6	Chen Tao-ming	Democratic Progressive Party	5,785	7.09%	
7	Kung Wen-chi (孔文吉)	Kuomintang	17,307	21.21%	Yes
8	Lin Wen-sheng	Taiwan Solidarity Union	3,719	4.56%	
9	Lin Chun-te	People First Party	12,179	14.93%	Yes
2008 (7th)
1	Syue Yi-jhen (薛宜蓁)	Civil Party	443	0.53%	
2	Kung Wen-chi	Kuomintang	22,391	26.54%	Yes
3	Chien Tung-ming	Kuomintang	22,659	26.86%	Yes
4	Hou Jin-jhu (侯金助)	Democratic Progressive Party	4,420	5.24%	
5	Kao Chin Su-mei	Non-Partisan Solidarity Union	20,012	23.72%	Yes
6	Lin Chun-te	People First Party	14,265	16.91%	
7	Sung Jen-ho (宋仁和)	Taiwan Constitution Association	168	0.20%	
2012 (8th)
1	Tseng Chih-yung (曾智勇)	Democratic Progressive Party	9,968	8.54%	
2	Kao Chin Su-mei	Non-Partisan Solidarity Union	29,520	25.29%	Yes
3	Chiu Wen-sheng (邱文生)	Independent	1,481	1.26%	
4	Kung Wen-chi	Kuomintang	31,629	27.10%	Yes
5	Walis Perin	People First Party	15,533	13.30%	
6	Chien Tung-ming	Kuomintang	28,581	24.48%	Yes
2016 (9th)
1	Lin Shih-wei (林世偉)	Independent	2,247	1.99%	
2	Yumin Suyang (尤命·蘇樣)	China Production Party	568	0.50%	
3	Tseng Hua-te	Independent	5,326	4.71%	
4	Walis Perin	Democratic Progressive Party	16,658	14.75%	
5	Yilan Mingjinuan (伊藍·明基努安)	Faith and Hope League	7,750	6.86%	
6	Kung Wen-chi	Kuomintang	20,105	17.80%	Yes
7	Chien Tung-ming	Kuomintang	25,940	22.96%	Yes
8	Chuan Cheng-wei (全承威)	Taiwan Independence Party	496	0.44%	
9	Lin Hsin-yi (林信義)	Faith and Hope League	6,185	5.48%	
10	Kao Chin Su-mei	Non-Partisan Solidarity Union	27,690	24.51%	Yes
