= Naming customs of Taiwanese indigenous peoples =

The naming customs of Indigenous Taiwanese are distinct from, though influenced by, the majority Han Chinese culture of Taiwan. Prior to contact with Han Chinese, the Indigenous Taiwanese named themselves according to each tribe's tradition. The naming system varies greatly depending on the particular tribes. Some tribes do not have family names, at least as part of the personal name.

Under the strong influence of Chinese culture and forces of cultural assimilation brought by Han settlers in the 17th century, the Indigenous Taiwanese have gradually adopted Han names. In the 17th and 18th centuries, possession of a Han surname was considered to be a sign of being civilized, in part because adoption of a Han surname meant that that person was now entered into the population registration books and could be taxed. Upon possessing a Han surname, most of the lowland Indigenous tribes assimilated with the Han immigrants, and eventually no longer saw themselves or were seen as a distinct population.

The handful of highland tribes generally kept separate names until after World War II when the government systematically assigned Han names to Indigenous Taiwanese. Taiwanese indigenous peoples settled near Hakka communities were sometimes assigned Hakka-like family names. For instance, Indigenous pop singer A-mei (張惠妹) may have a name with Hakka characteristics.

For a few decades in the first half of the 20th century under Japanese rule, a strict policy was put in place to quickly assimilate the island's inhabitants en masse by instituting Japanese names. These names were generally abandoned in Taiwan after 1945 when Japanese rule ended.

In the last two decades some Indigenous Taiwanese people have again taken up traditional names or chosen to emphasize them. However, few have abandoned their Han names, in part because the Austronesian names are difficult for non-Indigenous people to remember or pronounce. As a legacy of the anti-romanisation policy of the past, even these names are often written in Chinese characters to mimic their native sounds, even though Formosan languages are typically written in the Latin alphabet.

== Indigenous names ==
The naming rules of Indigenous Taiwanese:

Tribe	Structure	Example(s)	Note
Amis	Personal name + Patronymic/Matronymic name + Clan name Personal name + Clan name Personal name + Patronymic/Matronymic name	Ado' Kaliting Pacidal (阿洛·卡立亭·巴奇辣); Difang Tuwana (郭英男); Mayaw Ciro (陳鏞基)	Part of the tribe omit patronymic/matronymic name, directly connected clan name. Unable to visit the clan of the tribe, that alone is connected patronymic/matronymic name.
Saisiyat	Given name + Patronymic name + Clan name	Tahas Tain Kaybaybaw (打赫史·達印·改擺刨)	
Bunun	Given name + Clan name	Yohani Isqaqavut (尤哈尼·伊斯卡卡夫特)	
Tsou	Given name + Clan name	Uyongʉ Yata'uyungana (吾雍·雅達烏猶卡那; 高一生)	
Kavalan	Given name + Clan name	Baqah Siqeyu (潘金榮)	
Thao	Given name + Clan name	Kilash Shiqatafatu (石阿松)	
Atayal	Given name + Patronymic name	Yungai Hayung (溫嵐)	
Sediq	Given name + Patronymic name	Mona Rudao (莫那·魯道)	
Truku	Given name + Patronymic name	Bokeh Kosang (徐詣帆)	
Paiwan	Given name + House name	Uliw Qaljupayare (簡東明)	
Rukai	Given name + House name	Taiban Sasala (台邦·撒沙勒)	
Puyuma	Given name + House name	Paelabang Danapan (孫大川)	
Tao	Si + given name Si aman + firstborn name (father); Si nan + firstborn name (mother); Si apen + firstborn names (grandparents); Si apen kotan (great-grandparents)	Si Maraos (瑪拉歐斯); Si aman Rapongan (夏曼·藍波安); Si nan Mavivo (希婻‧瑪飛洑; 賴美惠); Si apen Sorong (謝加仁)	

== Examples ==
- Walis Nokan, Atayal, a famous indigenous activist and poet.
- Walis Perin, Seediq, minister of the Council of Indigenous Peoples.
- Ciwas Ali, Atayal name of Kao Chin Su-mei, a singer, actress and politician.
- Gulilai Amit, a.k.a. A-mei, an ethnic Puyuma pop singer.
- Attun Palalin, a.k.a. Teruo Nakamura, a Taiwan-born soldier of the Imperial Japanese Army who fought for Japan in World War II and did not surrender until 1974.

== See also ==
- Chinese name
- Japanese name
- Korean name
- Vietnamese name
- List of most common surnames
- Courtesy name
- Generation name
