= Rukai =

Rukai may refer to:

- Rukai people
- Rukai language
