= Wang Tien-ging =

Taiwanese politician

Wang Tien-ging MLY
- 王天競
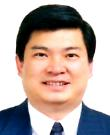
- Wang in the Third Legislative Yuan

Member of the Legislative Yuan
- In office 1 February 1999 – 31 January 2002
- Constituency: Kaohsiung 1
- In office 1 February 1990 – 31 January 1999
- Constituency: Kaohsiung 2

Personal details
- Born: 27 July 1947 (age 78) Nanking, China
- Party: Kuomintang (1965–2000; since 2002)
- Other political affiliations: People First Party (2000–2002)
- Spouse: Chou Liang-tai
- Occupation: politician

Wang Tien-ging (Chinese: 王天競; born 27 July 1947) is a Taiwanese politician who served in the Legislative Yuan from 1990 to 2002.

== Education ==
Wang attended primary and secondary schools in Kaohsiung before earning a bachelor's degree from Chinese Culture University and a master's degree from Roosevelt University.

== Political career ==
Wang joined the Kuomintang in 1965, and left for the People First Party shortly after its establishment in 2000. As a legislator, he maintained an interest in the military and defense. Wang did not receive a legislative nomination from the People First Party in 2001, and launched an independent campaign to represent Kaohsiung's first district. In November 2001, Wang was one of four legislative candidates indicted on charges of vote buying. Of those four candidates, Wang, Hsiao-Chin-lan, and Chuan Wen-sheng lost, while Hsu Chih-ming retained his seat. After stepping down from the legislature, Wang returned to the Kuomintang.

== Personal life ==
Wang is married to Chou Liang-tai.
