= Kao Yang-sheng =

Taiwanese politician

- 高揚昇

Political Deputy Minister of Council of Indigenous Peoples of the Republic of China
- In office 2 September 2013 – 31 July 2014
- Minister: Lin Chiang-yi
- Succeeded by: Tunkan Tansikian

Member of the Legislative Yuan
- In office 1 February 1996 – 31 January 2002
- Preceded by: Kao Tien-lai
- Succeeded by: Kao Chin Su-mei
- Constituency: Highland Aborigine

Personal details
- Born: 11 July 1952 (age 73)
- Party: Kuomintang
- Education: Fu Jen Catholic University (BA)

Kao Yang-sheng (Chinese: 高揚昇; pinyin: Gāo Yángshēng; born 11 July 1952) is a Taiwanese politician.

== Education ==
Kao obtained his bachelor's degree in philosophy from Fu Jen Catholic University.

== Political career ==
Kao sat in the Legislative Yuan from 1996 to 2002, representing the Highland Aborigine Constituency on behalf of the Kuomintang. Kao was appointed political deputy minister of the Council of Indigenous Peoples on 2 September 2013. He left the CIP on 31 July 2014 to serve as deputy magistrate of Taoyuan County.
