= Lu Hsien-yi =

Taiwanese physician and politician (born 1968)

Lu Hsien-yi MLY
- 盧縣一
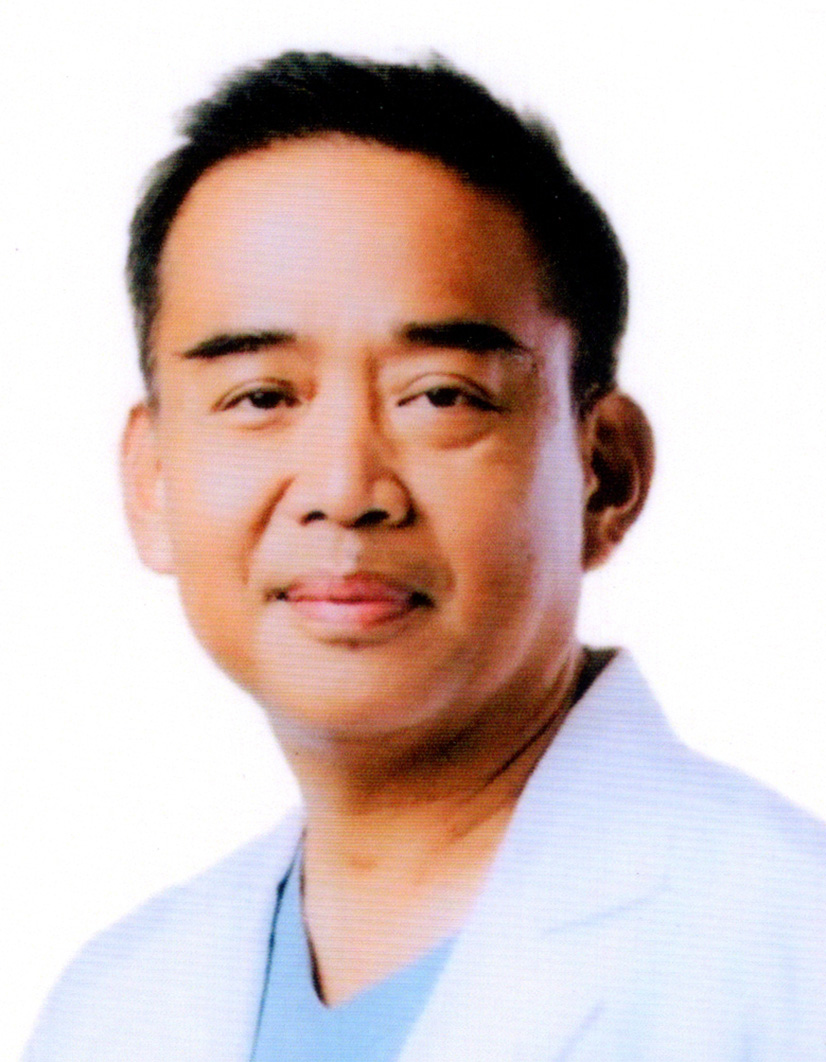
- Lu as a member of the Eleventh Legislative Yuan

Member of the Legislative Yuan
- Incumbent
- Assumed office 1 February 2024
- Preceded by: Kung Wen-chi
- Constituency: Highland Aborigine

Personal details
- Born: 28 April 1968 (age 58) Majia, Pingtung, Taiwan
- Party: Kuomintang
- Education: Kaohsiung Medical University (MD); National Taiwan University (MS)
- Profession: Physician

Lu Hsien-yi (Chinese: 盧縣一; born 28 April 1968), also known in Rukai as Sasuyu Ruljuwan, is a Taiwanese physician and politician of Paiwan and Rukai descent. A member of the Kuomintang (KMT), he was elected to the Legislative Yuan in 2024.

== Early life and education ==
Lu was born on 28 April 1968 in Pingtung County, Taiwan. His father, a Rukai politician from Wutai Township, served as a representative in Majia Township, while his mother is of Paiwan descent from Sandimen Township. Lu, whose indigenous name is Sasuyu Ruljuwan, is a member of the Vecekadan community of Sanhe Village in Majia, Pingtung.

Lu finished high school at National Pingtung Senior High School. He then graduated from Kaohsiung Medical University. After medical school, he trained as a resident in dermatology at National Cheng Kung University Hospital and in family medicine at Pingtung Hospital of the Ministry of Health.

Lu is a certified practitioner of family medicine. He later earned a graduate degree in health administration from National Taiwan University.

== Political career ==
In July 2023, Lu was nominated by the Kuomintang as a candidate for the 2024 legislative election representing the multi-member Highland Aborigine Constituency. He finished ahead of incumbent legislator Kung Wen-chi in the election, and took office as a member of the 11th Legislative Yuan on 1 February 2024. In April 2024, the Democratic Progressive Party accused the Kuomintang of rigging a legislative vote on pension reform, as Lu had not signed in, but had a vote registered in his name during the first round, then abstained from the following two rounds. Lu later confirmed that, at the time of all three votes, he was visiting China.
