= Wu Lihua =

The name Wu Lihua may refer to:

- Wu Lihua (吴丽华), a character in Chinese donghua series Link Click
- Wu Lihua (吴利华), Chinese actor who cast in s a Chinese historical series Story of Yanxi Palace
- Wu Li-hua (伍麗華; born 1969), Taiwanese educator and politician
