= Lin Yi-chun (politician) =

Taiwanese pharmacist and politician (born 1970)

Lin Yi-chun MLY
- 林憶君
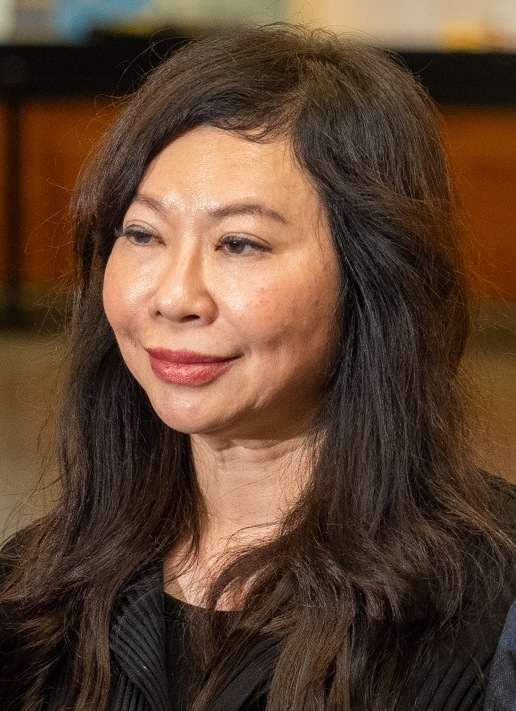
- Lin in 2025

Member of the Legislative Yuan
- In office 1 February 2024 – 1 February 2026
- Preceded by: Chen Chin-lung
- Constituency: Party-list (Taiwan People's Party)

Personal details
- Born: 4 October 1970 (age 56) Kaohsiung, Taiwan
- Party: Taiwan People's Party
- Education: Chia Nan University of Pharmacy and Science (BS); Tajen University (MS)

Lin Yi-chun (Chinese: 林憶君; pinyin: Lín Yìjūn; born 4 October 1970) is a Taiwanese pharmacist and politician.

== Education and early career ==
Lin earned a bachelor's degree from the Chia Nan University of Pharmacy and Science and a master's degree in pharmaceutical science from Tajen University. She has chaired the Hualien County Pharmacists Association and served as deputy secretary-general and secretary-general of the Federation of Taiwan Pharmacists Associations.

== Political career ==
Lin was elected to the Legislative Yuan in January 2024 via party list proportional representation, while affiliated with the Taiwan People's Party. She took an interest in national defense and diplomacy throughout her legislative term. In March, she opined that a Democratic Progressive Party proposal to add retired female officers and noncommissioned officers to the Republic of China Armed Forces Reserve would not substantially increase the amount of available reservists, as women were a minority in the armed forces. In May 2024, Lin and several legislative colleagues attended a press conference in Geneva, advocating for Taiwanese participation in that year's World Health Assembly. In July, Lin noted that Taiwan's national defense budget was higher than the average NATO member nation. That same month, Lin asked deputy Mainland Affairs Council minister Liang Wen-chieh to clarify an earlier comment that "two sides of the Taiwan Strait” and “the Republic of China (ROC) and People’s Republic of China (PRC)” had equivalent meanings, and stated that not treating the PRC like a country would be “ridiculous”. The following month, Lin criticized Ma Ying-jeou for stating the government had squandered money on national defense, observing that periodic review of military spending was warranted, as tensions with China had risen since Ma's presidency ended. After US presidential candidate Donald Trump stated that Taiwan should increase defense spending to 10% of gross domestic product, Lin commented that such an increase would not be beneficial.

In September 2024, Lin questioned the Ministry of Foreign Affairs for submitting a significantly larger budget proposal for overseas travel. Later that month, she received support from the Kuomintang and was elected a co-chair of the legislature's Foreign Affairs and National Defense Committee (FNDC), serving with Wang Ting-yu. As committee convenor, Lin requested that defense minister Wellington Koo submit a report to the FNDC on countermeasures against China's gray zone tactics.

In line with TPP regulations, Lin announced her resignation from the Legislative Yuan in January 2026.
