= Liu Shu-pin =

Taiwanese politician (born 1968)

Liu Shu-pin MLY
- 劉書彬
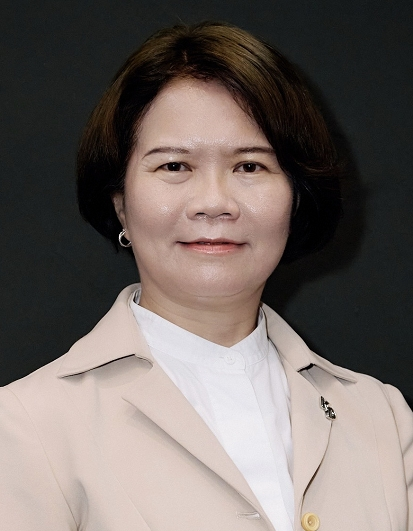
- Official portrait, 2025

Member of the Legislative Yuan
- Incumbent
- Assumed office 14 March 2025
- Preceded by: Wu Chun-cheng
- Constituency: Party-list (Taiwan People's Party)

Personal details
- Born: 30 May 1968 (age 58) Taipei, Taiwan
- Party: Taiwan People's Party
- Education: Soochow University (BS); Tamkang University (LLM); University of Cologne (PhD)

Liu Shu-pin (Chinese: 劉書彬; born 30 May 1968) is a Taiwanese political scientist and politician.

== Education and career ==
Liu earned a bachelor's degree in political science from Soochow University and a Master of Laws at Tamkang University before completing doctoral studies in Germany, where she earned her Ph.D. in political science from the University of Cologne in 1999. Her doctoral dissertation was titled, "Die deutsche Chinapolitik in den Jahren 1990–1996". She then returned to Soochow, holding a professorship within the Department of Political Science.

After Wu Chun-cheng announced his resignation as a party-list member of the Legislative Yuan, the Taiwan People's Party named Liu to Wu's seat.
