= Lin Chun-te =

Taiwanese Atayal politician

Lin Chun-te MLY
- 林春德

Member of the Legislative Yuan
- In office 1 February 1999 – 31 January 2008
- Constituency: Highland Aborigine

Member of the Taiwan Provincial Consultative Council
- In office 20 December 1989 – 20 December 1998

Personal details
- Born: 5 July 1947 (age 79) Nantou County, Taiwan
- Party: People First Party (since 2000)
- Other political affiliations: Kuomintang (until 2000)
- Education: National Pingtung University of Education; National Taiwan Normal University
- Occupation: politician

Lin Chun-te (Chinese: 林春德; pinyin: Lín Chūndé; born 5 July 1947) is a Taiwanese Atayal politician who served in the Legislative Yuan from 1999 to 2008.

== Early life and education ==
Lin was born in Nantou County and is of Atayal descent. He attended National Pingtung University of Education and completed further study in education at National Taiwan Normal University. Lin then worked as a teacher.

== Political career ==
Lin began his political career as mayor of Ren'ai, Nantou and later served on the Taiwan Provincial Consultative Council. He was first elected to the Legislative Yuan in 1998. In 2000, Lin's Kuomintang membership was revoked after he was found to have breached party regulations during the 2000 presidential election. He was reelected in 2001 as a member of the People First Party and won a third term in 2004. That year, Lin and Liao Kuo-tung led a protest against Vice President Annette Lu, after she stated that Aborigines were not the first people to live in Taiwan and that the group should move to Central America. Lin ran again in the legislative elections of 2008 and finished fourth in the Highland Aborigine district. In February, Lin was indicted for vote buying.
