= Chen Tao-ming =

Taiwanese politician (born 1947)

Chen Tao-ming (Chinese: 陳道明; pinyin: Chén Dàomíng; born 21 November 1947) is a Taiwanese politician.

== Early life and education ==
Chen is of Truku descent. He graduated from what became the National Pingtung University of Education and later attended Taipei Medical University.

== Political career ==
Chen served on the third National Assembly, in session from 1996 to 2000. He was elected to the fifth Legislative Yuan via proportional representation in December 2001, as part of the Democratic Progressive Party list. During his legislative term, Chen was the only indigenous lawmaker affiliated with the Democratic Progressive Party. As a legislator, Chen maintained an interest in indigenous rights and participated in foreign relations outreach, specifically on junkets to the United States, Canada, Palau, and the Solomon Islands. He ran for reelection in 2004, in the multimember Highland Aborigine district, but was unsuccessful. In March 2008, the Supreme Court dismissed Chen's appeal on charges of vote buying dating to 2004, sentencing him to twenty months imprisonment, a NT$500,000 fine, and suspension of his civil rights for four years.
