= Wu Chun-cheng =

Taiwanese politician (born 1961)

Wu Chun-cheng MLY
- 吳春城
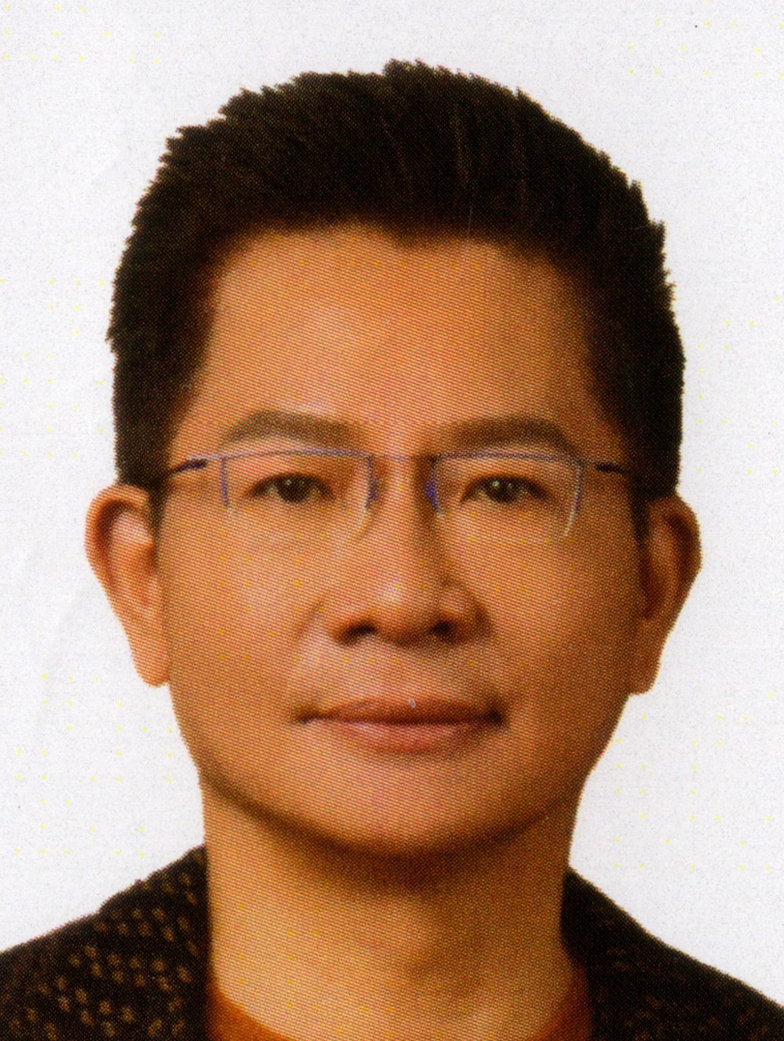

Member of the Legislative Yuan
- In office 1 February 2024 – 25 February 2025
- Succeeded by: Liu Shu-pin
- Constituency: Party-list (Taiwan People's Party)

Personal details
- Born: 18 August 1961 (age 64) Taoyuan County, Taiwan
- Party: Taiwan People's Party
- Education: National Central University (BA); National Sun Yat-sen University (LLM); Fudan University (PhD)

Wu Chun-cheng (Chinese: 吳春城; born 18 August 1961) is a Taiwanese business executive and politician.

== Education and early career ==
Wu graduated from National Central University with a Bachelor of Arts (B.A.) in literature. He then earned a Master of Laws (LL.M.) at National Sun Yat-sen University and a Ph.D. in business administration from Fudan University.

== Business career ==
Wu is the founding chairman of the Jet-Go Consulting Group, has served as director of the Cross-Strait Policy Association, and led the Strong Generation Educational and Cultural Association, advocating for dignified aging and aiding those who are to those aged 45, 55 or 60 and above, depending on varying definitions.

== Political career ==
Wu was elected to the Legislative Yuan in January 2024 via the Taiwan People's Party list for proportional representation, and has served as secretary-general of the TPP caucus. As a legislator, he continued advocating for educational and economic policy proposals to consider Taiwan's strong generation, and has discussed related issues with foreign delegations to Taiwan. In June 2024, legislator Wang Ting-yu alleged that Wu had skipped a vote on a bill exempting party-affiliated organizations from being implicated for holding ill-gotten assets.

Wu was invited to the July 2024 Inter-Parliamentary Alliance on China summit, and alongside Ariel Chang, co-organized a September 2024 march in New York City advocating for Taiwanese participation in the United Nations. After TPP chairman Ko Wen-je was linked to the Core Pacific City case and confirmed that he had used a presidential election subsidy to purchase his 2024 campaign headquarters, Wu commented that Ko was "Taiwan's [Nelson] Mandela.

Wu backed the passage of the Act for Promotion of Strong Generation Policies and Industrial Development through the Legislative Yuan in January 2025. On 25 February, he announced his resignation. Shortly after Wu's resignation, legislator Chen Pei-yu called for the act's repeal.

== Personal life ==
Wu is married to Chang Mei-hui.
