= Wang An-hsiang =

Taiwanese academic administrator and politician (born 1968)

Wang An-hsiang MLY
- 王安祥
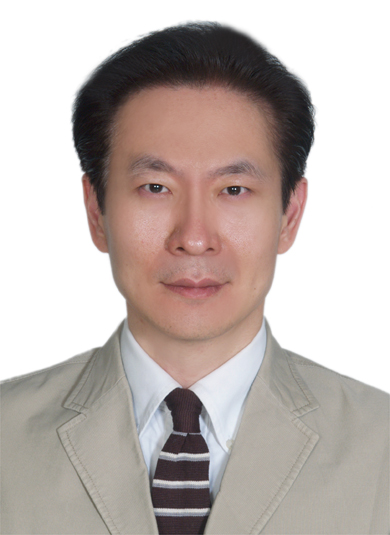
- Official portrait, 2026

Member of the Legislative Yuan
- Incumbent
- Assumed office 3 February 2026
- Preceded by: Mạch Ngọc Trân
- Constituency: Republic of China

Personal details
- Born: 23 January 1968 (age 58)
- Party: Taiwan People's Party
- Education: National Tsing Hua University

Wang An-hsiang (Chinese: 王安祥; born 23 January 1968) is a Taiwanese academic administrator and politician.

Wang earned a Master of Science and PhD in industrial engineering from National Tsing Hua University. Prior to seeking political office, Wang served National Chung Cheng University as secretary-general, and later became dean of the university's College of Social Sciences. Weeks before taking office as a legislator, Wang traveled with Taiwan People's Party chair Huang Kuo-chang and other party members to discuss national defense with American governmental officials.

Six members of the Legislative Yuan affiliated with the Taiwan People's Party announced their resignations in January 2026, and Wang assumed the seat vacated by Mạch Ngọc Trân on 3 February 2026. Within the legislature, Wang served as deputy caucus convener. He was assigned to the Foreign Affairs and National Defense Committee, and discussed matters related to national defense with a delegation from the United States in March.
