= Walis Perin =

Taiwanese politician

Walis Perin MLY
- Walis Perin
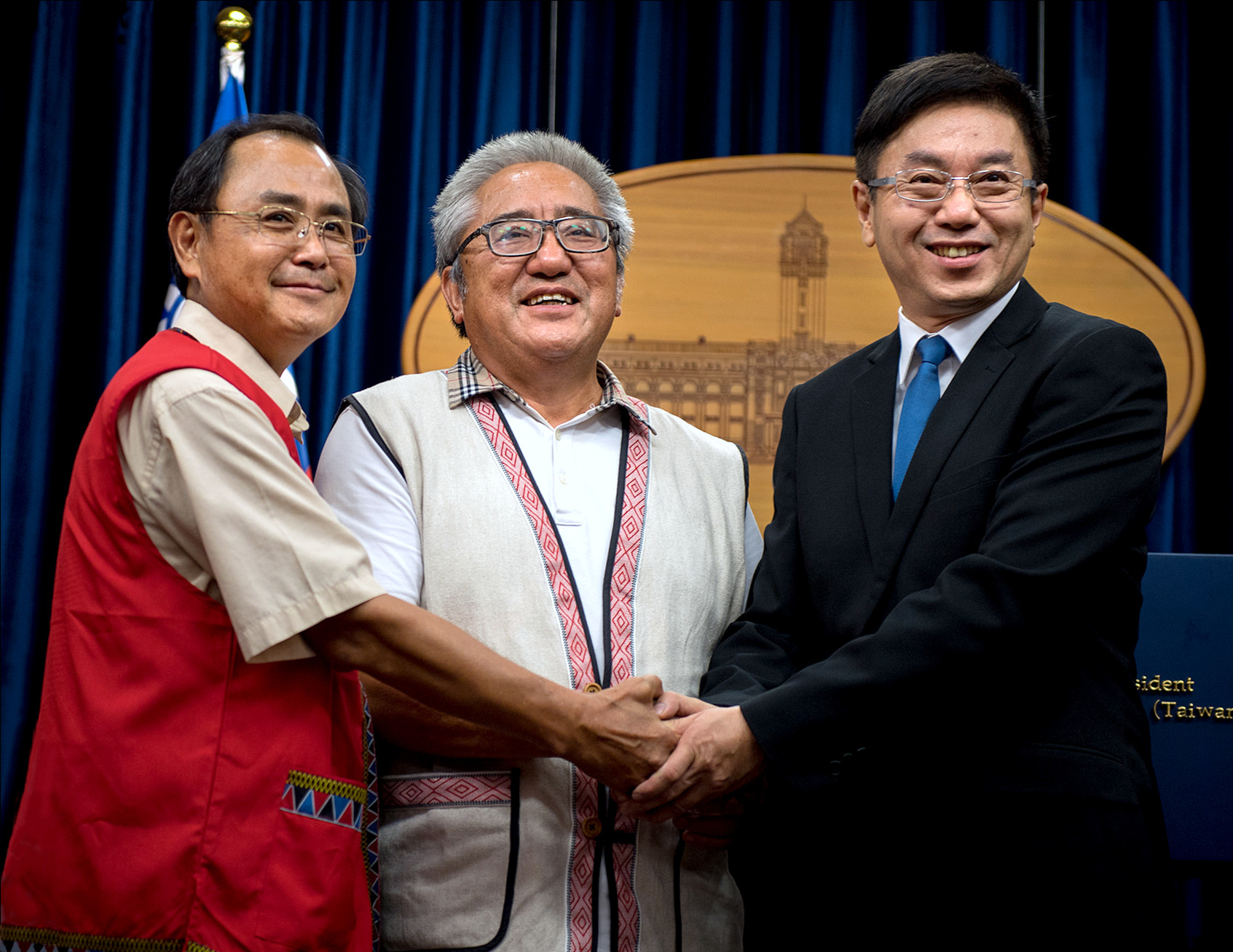
- Walis Perin (center) on 30 June 2017, after a meeting of the Indigenous Historical Justice and Transitional Justice Committee

Member of the Control Yuan
- Incumbent
- Assumed office 16 January 2018

Minister of the Council of Indigenous Peoples
- In office 10 March 2005 – 21 May 2007
- Preceded by: Chen Chien-nien
- Succeeded by: Icyang Parod

Member of the Legislative Yuan
- In office 1 February 1993 – 31 January 2005
- Preceded by: new seat in multi-member district
- Succeeded by: Kung Wen-chi
- Constituency: Highland Aborigine

Personal details
- Born: 8 August 1952 (age 73) Nantou County, Taiwan
- Party: Democratic Progressive Party (since 2015)
- Other political affiliations: Independent (before 1995); Kuomintang (1995–98); Democratic Non-Partisan Alliance (1998–2001); Taiwan Number One Party (Independent) (2001–2004); Non-Partisan Solidarity Union (2004–?); People First Party (2011–?)
- Education: Fu Jen Catholic University (BA, MA)

Walis Perin (born 8 August 1952) is a Seediq Taiwanese politician. He served four terms in the Legislative Yuan from 1993 to 2005, each time with a different political affiliation. He became a founding member of the Non-Partisan Solidarity Union in 2004, and after losing reelection, was appointed the minister for the Council of Indigenous Peoples in 2005. He stepped down in 2007, and since then has launched two unsuccessful legislative campaigns, in 2012 with the People First Party and 2016, representing the Democratic Progressive Party. In 2018, Walis Perin was appointed to the Control Yuan.

== Early life, education and career ==
Walis Perin was born in Nantou County on 8 August 1952 and obtained a bachelor's degree in philosophy followed by a master's degree in theology, both from Fu Jen Catholic University. He served as a Roman Catholic priest until 1986, when he won a seat on the Nantou County Council. Prior to 2008, when the government granted official status to the Seediq people, Wallis Perin was described as an Atayal.

== Political career ==
Walis Perin won a seat on the second Legislative Yuan as an independent in 1992. He ran under the Kuomintang banner in 1995, and won a second term. By 1998, Walis Perin left the KMT for the Democratic Non-Partisan Alliance, but again managed to keep his legislative seat. Walis Perin split from the DNPA to run for reelection yet again in 2001. He joined the Taiwan Number One Party, and was covered in Taiwanese media as an independent. In 2002, Walis Perin and other legislators reestablished a caucus for independents, of which he was named the convener.

As a legislator, Walis Perin worked extensively to protect aboriginal autonomy and culture. He proposed a bill that sought to form an aboriginal parliament and constitution, and has supported initiatives to cut the aboriginal unemployment rate. In further defense of aboriginal rights, Walis Perin has been known to lead protests. He and nine others founded the Non-Partisan Solidarity Union in June 2004. A month later, Vice President Annette Lu commented that aboriginals were not first to live on the island of Taiwan. Walis Perin planned a rally to counter the remark, and also said, "[Lu's] suggestion that Aboriginal people are not native to Taiwan and are outsiders is disrespectful and stems from an ignorance of the culture and history of the indigenous people." Shortly after the incident, it was recommended that the Council of Indigenous Peoples merge with the Hakka Affairs Council and the Mongolian and Tibetan Affairs Commission. The CIP and Walis Perin panned the suggestion, and the merger did not occur. In December, running as a Non-Partisan Solidarity Union candidate, Walis Perin was defeated in the legislative elections.

On 3 March 2005, Wallis Perin was appointed the minister of the Council of Indigenous Peoples, replacing Chen Chien-nien, who had resigned. Under his leadership, the CIP drafted a revision to laws pertaining to aboriginal autonomy, established a library and resource center for indigenous people, and helped start a radio station and television channel geared toward an aboriginal audience, the latter something Walis Perin had supported since his days in the legislature. Also during his tenure, the Sakizaya people applied for and received official governmental designation as a group separate from the Amis. Wallis Perin left the CIP in 2007, and was succeeded by Icyang Parod.

In August 2011, Walis Perin was named a People First Party candidate for the legislature, but lost. He ran again in 2016, this time with the Democratic Progressive Party. Walis Perin declared his candidacy in May 2015. During his campaign, he alleged that other candidates were engaging in electoral fraud. Shortly after defeating Walis Perin, Chien Tung-ming was indicted on charges of vote buying. In March 2017, President Tsai Ing-wen named Walis Perin to a position on the Control Yuan. He was also appointed to a committee set up to research aboriginal property rights. During questioning by the Legislative Yuan in January 2018, Wallis Perin stated that he supported the Control Yuan's abolition only if it was first approved by constitutional amendment and further backed by a referendum. Walis Perin was confirmed as a member of the Control Yuan on 16 January 2018, and took office immediately.
