= Mạch Ngọc Trân =

Vietnamese-born Taiwanese politician (born 1973)

Mai Yu-zhen
- Mạch Ngọc Trân; 麥玉珍
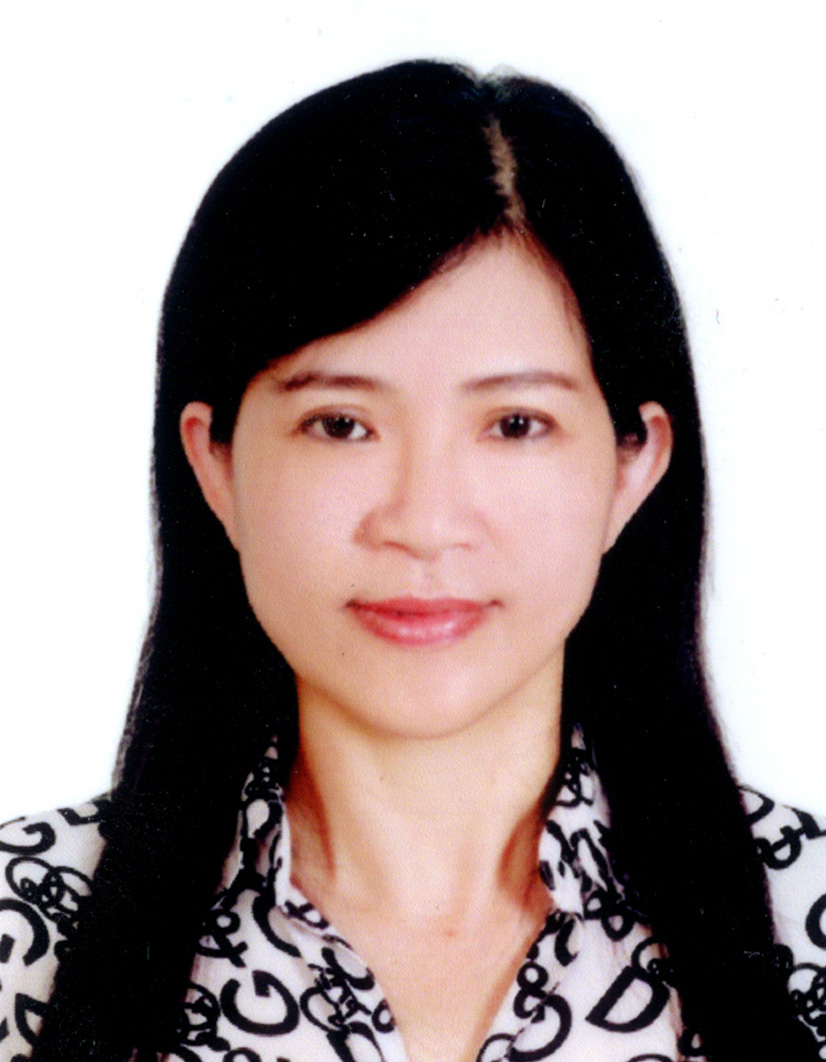

Member of the Legislative Yuan
- In office 1 February 2024 – 31 January 2026
- Succeeded by: Wang An-hsiang
- Constituency: Party-list

Personal details
- Born: 14 October 1973 (age 52) Biên Hòa Province, South Vietnam
- Citizenship: South Vietnam (1973–1975); Provisional Revolutionary Government of the Republic of South Vietnam (1975–1976); Vietnam (1976–1994); Republic of China (since 1994)
- Party: Taiwan People's Party (since 2024)
- Other political affiliations: Democratic Progressive Party (until 2024); Happy People Party (since 2022)
- Education: Providence University (BA, MA)

Mai Yu-zhen (Chinese: 麥玉珍; pinyin: Mài Yùzhēn; Vietnamese: Mạch Ngọc Trân; born 14 October 1973) is a Vietnamese-born Taiwanese politician.

== Early life and education ==
Mạch's family grew coffee beans, fruits and produce in Vietnam. Mạch was born in Biên Hòa province. She moved to Changhua County and acquired Taiwanese citizenship in 1994 after marrying a Taiwanese national, but later divorced her Taiwanese husband, citing domestic violence. Mạch then attended a master's program at Providence University and worked in Taichung.

== Career ==
She subsequently worked as a Vietnamese-language translator for the police and other governmental organizations. In 2022, Mạch was appointed the founding chair of the Happy People Party, and, at the time, also led the Taiwan Immigrant Association. In 2023, Mạch accepted a legislative nomination from the Taiwan People's Party, for which she was expelled from the Democratic Progressive Party. She won the 2024 election to the 11th Legislative Yuan on the Taiwan People's Party proportional representation party list. In line with TPP regulations, Mạch announced her resignation from the Legislative Yuan in January 2026.
