= Chien Tung-ming =

Taiwanese politician (1951–2024)

Uliw Qaljupayare MLY
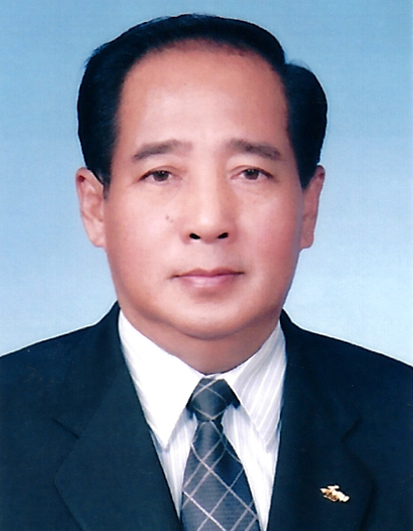
- Qaljupayare as a member of the Eighth Legislative Yuan

Member of the Legislative Yuan
- In office 1 February 2008 – 31 January 2020
- Preceded by: Tseng Hua-te
- Succeeded by: Wu Li-hua
- Constituency: Highland Aborigine

Personal details
- Born: 4 June 1951 Pingtung County, Taiwan
- Died: 11 March 2024 (aged 72) Kaohsiung, Taiwan
- Party: Kuomintang
- Spouse: Tai Chin-hua (戴錦花)
- Education: National Pingtung University of Education (BA); National Chung Hsing University (MPA)

Uliw Qaljupayare (Paiwan pronunciation: [ˈuliw qaʎupaˈjarə]; 4 June 1951 – 11 March 2024) was a Taiwanese politician. Also known by the Chinese name Chien Tung-ming (Chinese: 簡東明; pinyin: Jiǎn Dōngmíng), he represented the Highland Aborigine district for the Kuomintang from 2008 to 2020 at the Legislative Yuan.

== Early life and education ==
Born on 4 June 1951, Qaljupayare was a member of the Paiwan people of the Taiwanese aborigines in Shizi, Pingtung. He graduated from Fang Liao High School in Pingtung County before attending National Pingtung University of Education. He earned a master's degree in public administration and policy at National Chung Hsing University and taught at multiple elementary schools.

== Political career ==
Qaljupayare served Shizi Township as mayor for two terms from 1990 to 1998. He was elected to the Pingtung County Council later that year and stepped down in 2007 to prepare for a legislative campaign.

=== Electoral controversies ===
Qaljupayare was first elected to the Legislative Yuan in 2008 with 26.86% of the vote, to serve alongside Kao Chin Su-mei and Kung Wen-chi in the three-member Highland Aborigine district. Prosecutors in Kaohsiung sued Qaljupayare in February 2012 as part of a vote-buying probe related to the 2008 elections, and three of his staff were imprisoned, but Qaljupayare himself was cleared in 2013. More vote-buying allegations against Qaljupayare, this time in his native Pingtung County, surfaced during the 2016 legislative elections. The 2016 case was taken to Taichung District Court, where prosecutors sought an annulment of Qaljupayare's election victory. Qaljupayare and 57 others, including some of his campaign staff and a number of Pingtung County residents, were indicted in March. The Pingtung District Court issued the first ruling on the case in June 2017, sentencing Qaljupayare to five and a half years imprisonment. As a result of the guilty verdict, Qaljupayare became the first Taiwanese legislator to be suspended from his duties due to court proceedings. Upon appeal in January 2019, Qaljupayare's penalty was reduced, and he was acquitted in April of that year by the Kaohsiung branch of the Taiwan High Court. Qaljupayare did not run in the 2020 legislative elections, and was succeeded in office by Wu Li-hua in 2020, who contested the seat on behalf of the Democratic Progressive Party.

=== Legislative actions ===
Qaljupayare coauthored an amendment to the Mountain Slope Conservation and Utilization Act in 2012 that led to criticism from many aboriginal rights groups. The act contained a clause that mandated how long an aborigine was to keep their land before legally selling it. Chin, Kung, and Qaljupayare, along with Sra Kacaw, Liao Kuo-tung, and Lin Cheng-er, all aborigines, believed that the five-year ownership period mandated in the law was discriminatory and irrelevant, as the law already stated that all aboriginal land could only be sold to another aborigine. Qaljupayare authored another law related to aboriginal land reform in 2015, making it legal for aborigines to receive monetary compensation on land they own within conservation areas because they are barred from developing land marked as protected territory.

=== Political stances ===
Qaljupayare often criticized the Council of Indigenous Peoples for not supporting aboriginal people adequately. To give aboriginals more influence in the parliament, he advocated the reestablishment of an aboriginal caucus during his first term in office. In his first term as legislator, Qaljupayare opposed a proposal to remove the distinction between highland and lowland districts. Thereafter, he proposed that both nationwide aboriginal districts, currently divided by tribal groupings, be divided instead into three separate constituencies based on geography.

Qaljupayare described the Aboriginal Basic Act as ineffective. The law, passed in 2005, mandates that other bills relating to aboriginal affairs should have been passed by 2008. The Democratic Progressive Party administration in power at the time had proposed many initiatives, but most had been stalled in the legislature. Additionally, the Council of Indigenous Peoples had shut down four of the amendments proposed by the deadline.

Though Qaljupayare backed marriage between aboriginals and Han Taiwanese, he opposed the legalization of same-sex marriage.

== Personal life and death ==
Qaljupayare was married to Tai Chin-hua.

Qaljupayare Tung-ming, who had required regular kidney dialysis late in his life, died at Kaohsiung Veterans General Hospital on 11 March 2024, at the age of 72.
