= Tajen University =

University in Yanpu, Taiwan

Coordinates: 22.7269°N 120.5435°E

- 大仁科技大學
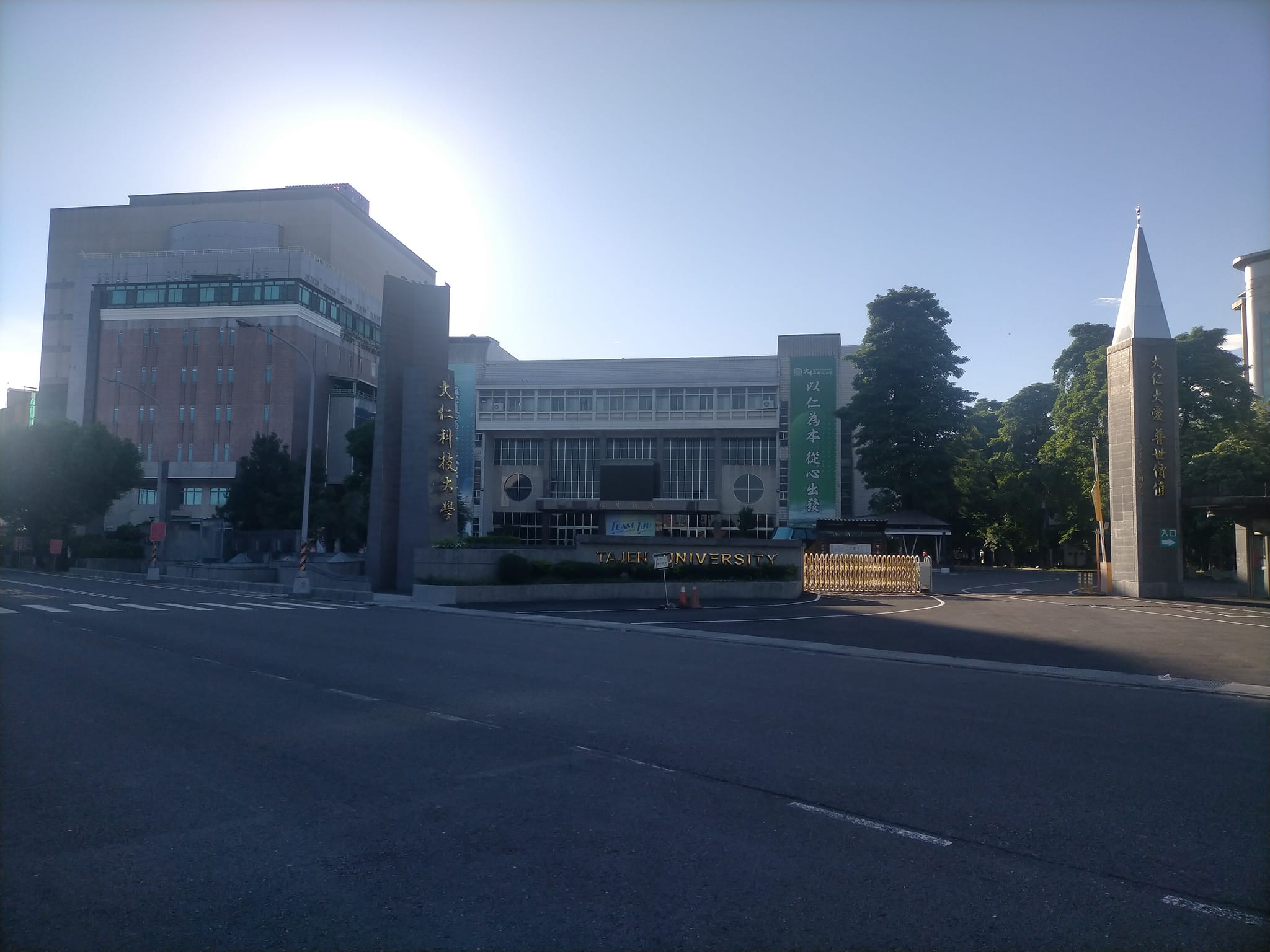
- Type: Private university
- Established: 1966 (as Tajen Pharmacy Institute); August 2005 (as Tajen University)
- Location: Yanpu, Pingtung County, Taiwan
- Website: www.tajen.edu.tw

Tajen University
- Traditional Chinese: 大仁科技大學
Transcriptions
Standard Mandarin
- Hanyu Pinyin: Dàrén Kējì Dàxué
- Wade–Giles: Ta^{4}-jen^{2} K'o^{1}-chi^{4} Ta^{4}-hsueh^{2}
Southern Min
- Hokkien POJ: Tāi-jîn Kho-ki Tāi-ha̍k

Tajen University (Chinese: 大仁科技大學; pinyin: Dàrén Kējì Dàxué) is a private university in Yanpu Township, Pingtung County, Taiwan.

== History ==
Taoyi Huang, the incumbent chairman of the board, and Yuan Tsai Lee, founded Tajen Pharmacy Institute in 1966. Tajen has grown and prospered during the years. When the institute was established, there was only one Department of Pharmacy, a five-year program for junior college students.

In 1980, other departments were established. Since its foundation, Tajen has been implementing its motto and pursuing the goal of becoming an excellent institute of higher learning. It has achieved this and has gained recognition from the Ministry of Education and society-at-large.

Tajen was upgraded from a five-year junior college to a university-level institute of Tajen University with affiliated five-year junior college programs since August 1, 1999 by permission of the Ministry of Education. Moreover, to carry out the education policy of lifelong learning, Tajen provides programs such as a two-year bachelor program for junior college graduates, and another two-year program for high school graduates. Currently, the student population exceeds 14,000.

The present president is Dr. Rhei-Long Chen.

== Faculties ==
- College of Humanities and Informatics
- College of Leisure and Hospitality
- College of Pharmacy and Health Care

== See also ==
- List of universities in Taiwan
