= Wu Li-hua =

Taiwanese politician (born 1969)

Wu Li-hua MLY
- Saidhai Tahovecahe
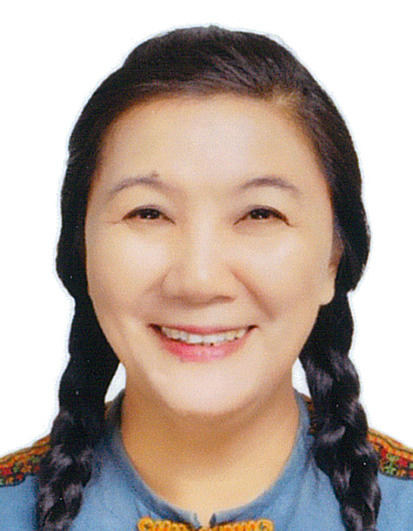
- Tahovecahe as a member of the Tenth Legislative Yuan

Member of the Legislative Yuan
- Incumbent
- Assumed office 1 February 2020
- Preceded by: Chien Tung-ming
- Constituency: Highland Aborigine

Personal details
- Born: 12 August 1969 (age 57) Maolin District, Kaoshiung, Taiwan
- Party: Democratic Progressive Party
- Education: National Pingtung University of Education (BA, MA)

Saidhai Tahovecahe (born 12 August 1969), known also as Wu Li-hua (Chinese: 伍麗華), is a Taiwanese Rukai educator and politician. She is the first legislator of the Democratic Progressive Party to represent the Highland Aborigine Constituency, to which she was elected in 2020.

== Early life and teaching career ==
Tahovecahe is from Wanshan Village, in Maolin District, Kaohsiung. She was born on 12 August 1969, to a mother of Rukai descent, and a father of Mainland Chinese descent. She earned degrees from the National Pingtung University of Education, and, during a 27-year career in education, served as a principal within two primary schools in Pingtung County.

== Political career ==
Tahovecahe worked in the Pingtung County Government under the administration of magistrate Pan Men-an starting in 2016. She was credited with increasing the vote share among the indigenous population for Pan. In Pan's administration, Tahovecahe was the director-general of the Indigenous Peoples Department and later the director of the Bureau of Cultural Affairs. She was subsequently appointed to the Indigenous Historical Justice and Transitional Justice Committee. In this capacity, Tahovecahe was one of the signatories of an open letter addressed to Xi Jinping on behalf of Taiwanese indigenous people in January 2019, shortly after he had commented on Chinese unification and the political status of Taiwan.

In August 2019, Tahovecahe was nominated by the Democratic Progressive Party to run for legislative office in the multimember Highland Aborigine Constituency. In January 2020, Tahovecahe was elected to the Legislative Yuan as one of three representatives in the Highland Aborigine Constituency. She succeeded Chien Tung-ming, who did not run for reelection. With her electoral victory, Tahovecahe became the first Democratic Progressive Party legislator to represent the Highland Aborigine Constituency.
