= Tjivuluan Paracasaw =

Taiwanese politician

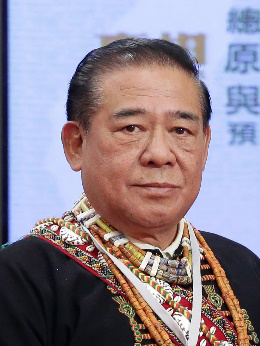
Picture of Paracasaw

Tjivuluan Paracasaw (born 18 October 1957) is a Taiwanese Paiwan politician. A member of the Kuomintang, he represented the Highland Aborigine Constituency in the Legislative Yuan from 1999 to 2008.

== Education and early career ==
Paracasaw studied at Taitung Agricultural Extension School and what became the National Pingtung University of Education. He later took graduate-level coursework in public administration at Tunghai University. Prior to his political career, Paracasaw was a teacher.

== Political career ==
Paracasaw served two terms as mayor of Laiyi, Pingtung, followed by two terms as a member of the Taiwan Provincial Assembly. He was elected to three terms as a member of the Legislative Yuan, serving the Highland Aborigine Constituency, and representing the Kuomintang.

In 2002, Paracasaw and other lawmakers voted in opposition to Kuomintang caucus directives while considering nominations for the Examination Yuan. He was proposed for expulsion from the party, though the only punitive measure he received was an admonition.

== Personal life ==
Paracasaw is of Paiwan descent and has led the Autonomous Confederation of Paiwan Aborigines.
