= Tama Talum prosecution =

The Tama Talum Judicial Case, known in Taiwan as the Wang Guanglu case (Chinese: 王光祿案; pinyin: Wáng Guānglù àn), is a controversial criminal case in Taiwan involving the prosecution of Tama Talum, a Bunun Aborigine, for possession of an illegal firearm and poaching. Talum was convicted in 2015 and sentenced to three and a half years in prison. Following a ruling by the Council of Grand Justices which did not acquit Talum, Talum was pardoned by President Tsai Ing-wen. The case has sparked protests and much discussion of indigenous rights in Taiwan.

== Case history ==
=== 2013 arrest ===
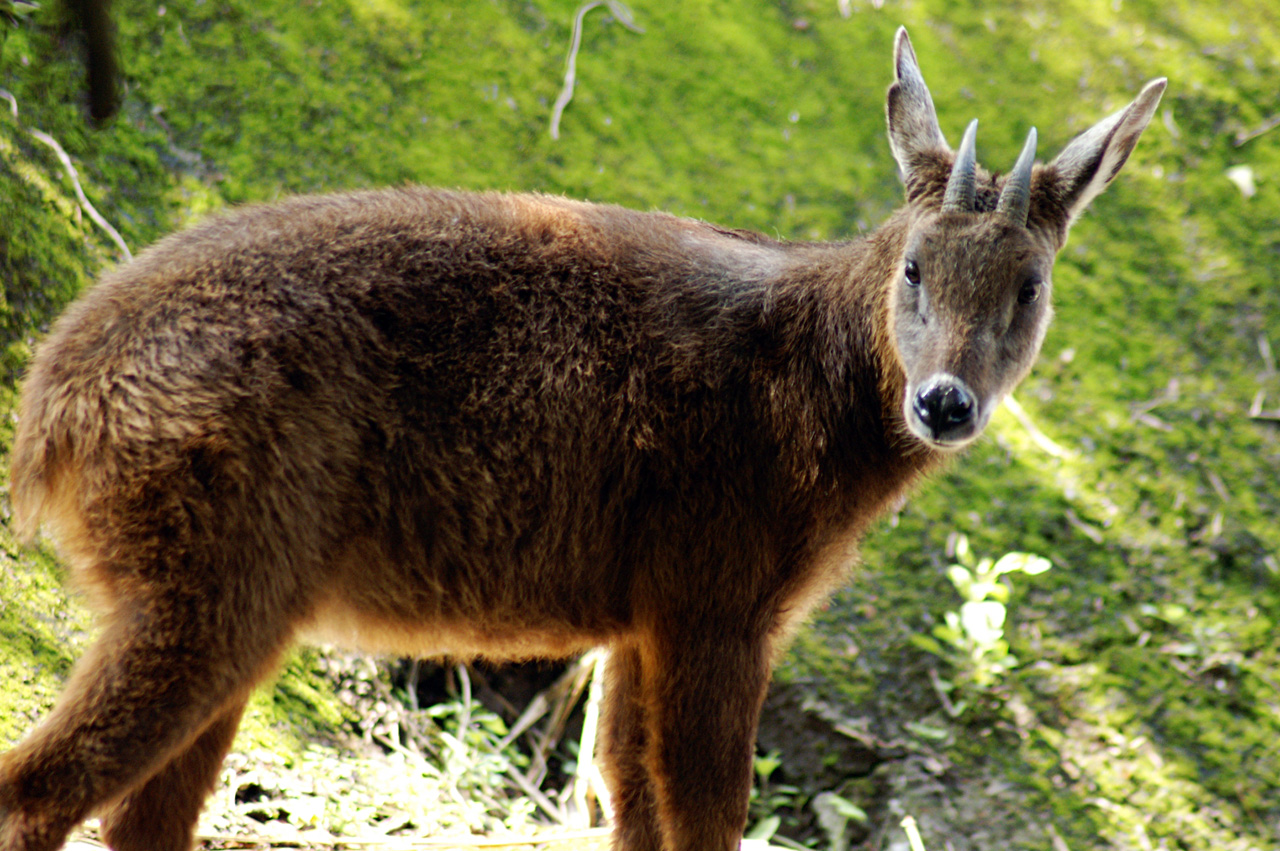
The Formosan serow

In July 2013 Tama Talum – also known by his Chinese name Wang Guanglu (Chinese: 王光祿; pinyin: Wáng Guānglù; Pe̍h-ōe-jī: Ông Kong-lo̍k) – a 54-year-old man from the Bunun tribe, went hunting in the mountains in Taitung County to obtain meat for his elderly mother. After killing a Formosan serow and a Reeve's muntjac, Talum was arrested for violation of the Controlling Guns, Ammunition and Knives Act as the shotgun he was carrying was not "home-made" (the act provides exceptions for Aborigines with home-made weapons). He was also charged with violation of the Wildlife Conservation Act as his hunt was deemed to fall outside permitted ceremonial activities. Talum did not deny the facts of the case, but maintained that his actions were not illegal. Aboriginal and human rights groups protested that hunting is an integral part of Bunun culture, and that Talum was being prosecuted for a "filial act" (i.e. hunting to provide meat for his elderly mother).

=== 2015 conviction ===
After being found guilty on both charges in the case by the Hualien County District Court's 103rd Branch, in its 17th ruling on an appeal for the year 2014 (花蓮分院103年度原上訴字第17號), Talum was sentenced to three years and two months in prison for possession of an illegal weapon, and seven months for violating the Wildlife Conservation Act. Part of the sentences were to run concurrently, so the total sentence was three years and six months. He was also fined NT$70,000. Community groups criticised the harshness of the sentence, and Talum was defended by a seven-person legal team from the Taitung Legal Aid Foundation, who argued that the Controlling Guns, Ammunition and Knives Act did not limit Aboriginal hunters to "home-made" weapons.

=== 2015–2017 appeal to the Supreme Court ===
On 15 December 2015 Talum was due to start his prison sentence. He remained at home with his mother in Haiduan, Taitung, waiting for authorities to come for him, but the local police reported that they were waiting for orders from above. On the same day Prosecutor-General Yen Da-ho filed an extraordinary appeal to the Supreme Court, asserting that the original judgment in the case was itself illegal.

The Supreme Court, in a ruling by its seventh criminal division, found that the case had constitutional significance and referred the case to the Council of Grand Justices, Taiwan's constitutional court, in 2017, in its first ruling for that year (最高法院106年度台非字第1號).

=== 2021 Council of Grand Justices ruling and pardon ===
On 7 May 2021, in Interpretation No. 803 (司法院釋字第803號解釋), the Council of Grand Justices found some elements of the law unconstitutional, especially as they related to restrictions on the guns that indigenous people could own, overturning the requirement that indigenous firearms must be handmade. Nevertheless, the Court ruled that prosecutions remain constitutional if they concern the killing of endangered species.

As Talum could have found himself re-prosecuted on the offenses as they related to the killing of endangered species, President Tsai Ing-wen pardoned Tama Talum on 20 May, her first ever use of the pardon power and only the seventh pardon in Taiwanese history. Talum vows to keep hunting "until he dies", and so there is technically a possibility he could be re-tried were he to kill another animal considered endangered under Taiwanese law.
