= Marai Gumi =

Taiwanese politician

Marai Gumi or Kao Tien-lai (Chinese: 高天來; 1951–2006) was a Taiwanese Atayal politician.

Marai Gumi was born on 23 August 1951. He attended National Sun Yat-sen University. Prior to representing what became known as the Highland Aborigine Constituency in the Legislative Yuan from 1990 to 1996, he was mayor of Jianshi, Hsinchu.
