= Highland Aborigine Constituency =

Constituency of the Legislative Yuan of Taiwan

Highland Aborigine district
- Multi-members constituency for the Legislative Yuan
- Electorate: Taiwanese aborigines

Current constituency
- Created: 1972
- Member(s): Ciwas Ali (2008–); Saidhai Tahovecahe (2020–); Sasuyu Ruljuwan (2024–)

The Highland Aborigine constituency (Chinese: 山地原住民選舉區; pinyin: Shāndì Yuán Zhùmín Xuǎnjǔ Qū) is a multi-member constituency of the Legislative Yuan. Taiwanese indigenous people have elected representatives to reserved legislative seats since the 1970s. Predecessors to both the Highland and Lowland Aborigine districts were established in 1994. Since 2008, the Highland Taiwanese indigenous elect three members to the Legislative Yuan.

== Legislators ==
Election	Representative	Representative	Representative	Representative
1972	Hua Ai (Paiwan); Tarigu Pujaruyang; Kuomintang			
1975	Hua Ai (Paiwan); Tarigu Pujaruyang; Kuomintang			
1980	Hua Ai (Paiwan); Tarigu Pujaruyang; Kuomintang			
1983	Hua Ai (Paiwan); Tarigu Pujaruyang; Kuomintang			
1986	Lin Tien-sheng (Paiwan); Kuomintang			
1989	Kao Tien-lai (Atayal); Kuomintang	Hua Chia-chih (Paiwan); Tjaravak Kadrangian; Kuomintang		
1992	Kao Tien-lai (Atayal); Kuomintang	Hua Chia-chih (Paiwan); Tjaravak Kadrangian; Kuomintang	Walis Perin (Seediq); Independent	
1995	Kao Yang-sheng (Atayal); Kuomintang	Chuan Wen-sheng (Bunun); Kuomintang	Walis Perin (Seediq); Kuomintang	
1998	Kao Yang-sheng (Atayal); Kuomintang	Tseng Hua-te (Paiwan); Tjivuluan; Kuomintang	Walis Perin (Seediq); National Democratic Non-Party Union	Lin Chun-te (Seediq); Kuomintang
2001	Kao Chin Su-mei (Atayal); Ciwas Ali; Independent	Tseng Hua-te (Paiwan); Tjivuluan; Kuomintang	Walis Perin (Seediq); Taiwan Number One Party	Lin Chun-te (Seediq); People First Party
2004	Kao Chin Su-mei (Atayal); Ciwas Ali; Independent	Tseng Hua-te (Paiwan); Tjivuluan; Kuomintang	Kung Wen-chi (Seediq); Yosi Takun; Kuomintang	Lin Chun-te (Seediq); People First Party
2008	Kao Chin Su-mei (Atayal); Ciwas Ali; Non-Partisan Solidarity Union	Chien Tung-ming (Paiwan); Uliw Qaljupayare; Kuomintang	Kung Wen-chi (Seediq); Yosi Takun; Kuomintang	
2012	Kao Chin Su-mei (Atayal); Ciwas Ali; Non-Partisan Solidarity Union	Chien Tung-ming (Paiwan); Uliw Qaljupayare; Kuomintang	Kung Wen-chi (Seediq); Yosi Takun; Kuomintang	
2016	Kao Chin Su-mei (Atayal); Ciwas Ali; Non-Partisan Solidarity Union	Chien Tung-ming (Paiwan); Uliw Qaljupayare; Kuomintang	Kung Wen-chi (Seediq); Yosi Takun; Kuomintang	
2020	Kao Chin Su-mei (Atayal); Ciwas Ali; Independent	Wu Li-hua (Rukai); Saidhai Tahovecahe; Democratic Progressive Party	Kung Wen-chi (Seediq); Yosi Takun; Kuomintang	
2024	Kao Chin Su-mei (Atayal); Ciwas Ali; Independent	Wu Li-hua (Rukai); Saidhai Tahovecahe; Democratic Progressive Party	Lu Hsien-yi (Paiwan/Rukai); Sasuyu Ruljuwan; Kuomintang	

== Election results ==
=== 2024 ===
Legislative Election 2024: Highland Aborigine Constituency
Party	Candidate	Votes	%	±%
Independent	Kao Chin Su-mei	37,131	25.75	
DPP	Wu Li-hua	31,874	22.10	
Kuomintang	Lu Hsien-yi	22,284	15.45	
Kuomintang	Kung Wen-chi	21,304	14.77	
Independent	Zhang Zi Xiao	11,726	8.13	
Independent	Savungaz Valincinan	6,840	4.74	
Independent	Lin Shi Wei	6,331	4.39	
TPP	Hu Huang Guang Wen	6,143	4.26	
Judicial Reform Party	Kao Wan Hsin	351	0.24	
Independent	Lin Kuo	230	0.16	
Total valid votes		144,214		
Independent hold		Swing		
DPP hold		Swing		
Kuomintang hold		Swing		
