= Chuan Wen-sheng =

Taiwanese politician

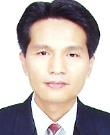
Chuan Wen-sheng

Chuan Wen-sheng (Chinese: 全文盛; pinyin: Quán Wénshèng; born 13 July 1959) is a Taiwanese politician.

== Education ==
Chuan graduated from what became Chung Shan Medical University.

== Political career ==
Chuan was mayor of Xinyi Township in Nantou County for two terms prior to his 1995 election to the Legislative Yuan as a member of the Kuomintang representing the Highland Aborigine district. He lost reelection in 1999, and ran again in 2001. During his unsuccessful 2001 legislative campaign, Chuan was indicted for vote buying, as were fellow candidates Hsiao-Chin-lan, Hsu Chih-ming, and Wang Tien-ching.
