= 11th Legislative Yuan =

Session of the Legislative Yuan of Taiwan

←	10th	12th	→

Overview
- Legislative body: Legislative Yuan
- Jurisdiction: Republic of China
- Meeting place: Legislative Yuan Building
- Term: 1 February 2024 – 31 January 2028
- Election: 2024 Taiwanese legislative election
- Government: Chen Chien-jen cabinet Cho cabinet
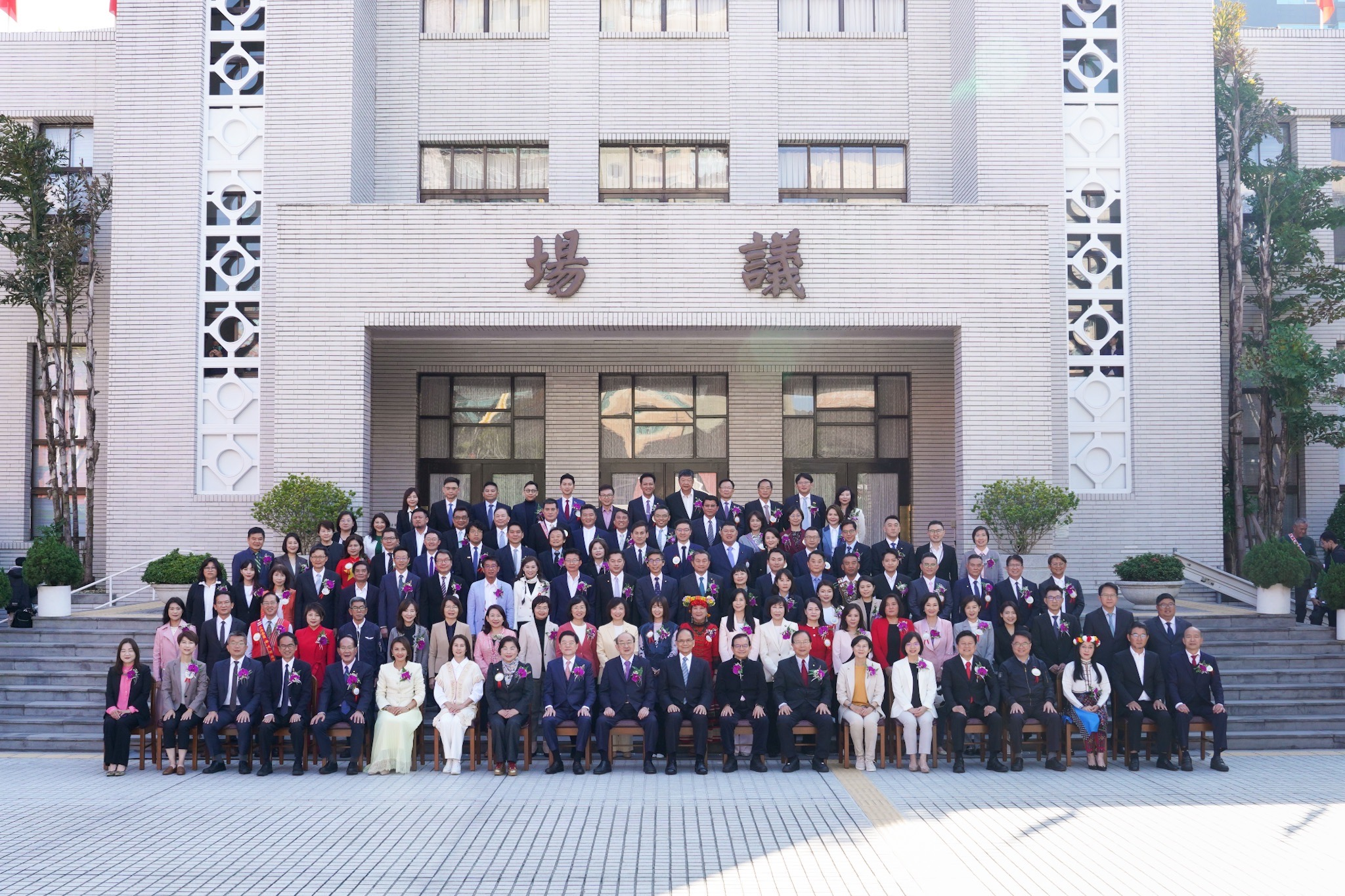
- Group portrait, February 2024
- Members: 113
- Speaker: Han Kuo-yu (KMT)
- Deputy Speaker: Johnny Chiang (KMT)
- Majority Leader: Fu Kun-chi (KMT)
- Minority Leader: Ker Chien-ming (DPP)
- Secretary General: Chou Chester W.L.

Seat composition for the 11th Legislative Yuan KMT (52) DPP (51) TPP (8) Independent (2)

The 11th Legislative Yuan is the current term of members of the Legislative Yuan of the Republic of China (Taiwan) which began on 1 February 2024.

Members were elected in the 2024 legislative election, in which the Democratic Progressive Party (DPP) lost majority status. This is the first time since the election of 2004 that no party received an absolute majority in the Legislative Yuan. Han Kuo-yu was elected the President of the Legislative Yuan. The next legislative election is due for 2028.

== Composition ==
Affiliation	Elected in 2024	Current	Remarks
Kuomintang	52	52	
**Democratic Progressive Party**	51	51	
Taiwan People's Party	8	8	
Independent	2	2	Caucus with Kuomintang
Total	113	113	

Note: Bold represents ruling party

=== Single-member constituency ===
Constituency		Legislator	Party
Taipei City	I	Rosalia Wu	Democratic Progressive Party
Taipei City	II	Wang Shih-chien	Democratic Progressive Party
Taipei City	III	Wang Hung-wei	Kuomintang
Taipei City	IV	Lee Yen-hsiu	Kuomintang
Taipei City	V	Wu Pei-yi	Democratic Progressive Party
Taipei City	VI	Lo Chih-chiang	Kuomintang
Taipei City	VII	Hsu Chiao-hsin	Kuomintang
Taipei City	VIII	Lai Shyh-bao	Kuomintang
New Taipei City	I	Hung Mong-kai	Kuomintang
New Taipei City	II	Lin Shu-fen	Democratic Progressive Party
New Taipei City	III	Lee Kuen-cheng	Democratic Progressive Party
New Taipei City	IV	Wu Ping-jui	Democratic Progressive Party
New Taipei City	V	Su Chiao-hui	Democratic Progressive Party
New Taipei City	VI	Chang Hung-lu	Democratic Progressive Party
New Taipei City	VII	Yeh Yuan-chih	Kuomintang
New Taipei City	VIII	Chang Chih-lun	Kuomintang
New Taipei City	IX	Lin Te-fu	Kuomintang
New Taipei City	X	Wu Chi-ming	Democratic Progressive Party
New Taipei City	XI	Lo Ming-tsai	Kuomintang
New Taipei City	XII	Liao Hsien-hsiang	Kuomintang
Taoyuan City	I	Niu Hsu-ting	Kuomintang
Taoyuan City	II	Tu Chuan-chi	Kuomintang
Taoyuan City	III	Lu Ming-che	Kuomintang
Taoyuan City	IV	Wan Mei-ling	Kuomintang
Taoyuan City	V	Lu Yu-ling	Kuomintang
Taoyuan City	VI	Chiu Jo-hua	Kuomintang
Taichung City	I	Tsai Chi-chang	Democratic Progressive Party
Taichung City	II	Yen Kuan-heng	Kuomintang
Taichung City	III	Yang Chiung-ying	Kuomintang
Taichung City	IV	Sean Liao Wei-hsiang	Kuomintang
Taichung City	V	Huang Chien-hao	Kuomintang
Taichung City	VI	Lo Ting-wei	Kuomintang
Taichung City	VII	Ho Hsin-chun	Democratic Progressive Party
Taichung City	VIII	Johnny Chiang	Kuomintang
Tainan City	I	Lai Huei-yuen	Democratic Progressive Party
Tainan City	II	Kuo Kuo-wen	Democratic Progressive Party
Tainan City	III	Chen Ting-fei	Democratic Progressive Party
Tainan City	IV	Lin I-chin	Democratic Progressive Party
Tainan City	V	Lin Chun-hsien	Democratic Progressive Party
Tainan City	VI	Wang Ting-yu	Democratic Progressive Party
Kaohsiung City	I	Chiu Yi-ying	Democratic Progressive Party
Kaohsiung City	II	Chiu Chih-wei	Democratic Progressive Party
Kaohsiung City	III	Lee Po-yi	Democratic Progressive Party
Kaohsiung City	IV	Lin Tai-hua	Democratic Progressive Party
Kaohsiung City	V	Lee Kun-tse	Democratic Progressive Party
Kaohsiung City	VI	Huang Jie	Democratic Progressive Party
Kaohsiung City	VII	Hsu Chih-chieh	Democratic Progressive Party
Kaohsiung City	VIII	Lai Jui-lung	Democratic Progressive Party
Hsinchu County	I	Hsu Hsin-ying	Kuomintang
Hsinchu County	II	Lin Szu-ming	Kuomintang
Miaoli County	I	Chen Chao-ming	Independent (Caucuses with KMT)
Miaoli County	II	Chiu Chen-chun	Kuomintang
Changhua County	I	Chen Hsiu-bao	Democratic Progressive Party
Changhua County	II	Huang Hsiu-fang	Democratic Progressive Party
Changhua County	III	Hsieh Yi-fong	Kuomintang hold
Changhua County	IV	Chen Su-yueh	Democratic Progressive Party
Nantou County	I	Ma Wen-chun	Kuomintang
Nantou County	II	Yu Hao	Kuomintang
Yunlin County	I	Ting Hsueh-chung	Kuomintang
Yunlin County	II	Liu Chien-kuo	Democratic Progressive Party
Chiayi County	I	Tsai Yi-yu	Democratic Progressive Party
Chiayi County	II	Chen Kuan-ting	Democratic Progressive Party
Pingtung County	I	Chung Chia-pin	Democratic Progressive Party
Pingtung County	II	Hsu Fu-kuei	Democratic Progressive Party
Yilan County		Chen Chun-yu	Democratic Progressive Party
Hualien County		Fu Kun-chi	Kuomintang
Taitung County		Huang Chien-pin	Kuomintang
Penghu County		Yang Yao	Democratic Progressive Party
Kinmen County		Chen Yu-jen	Kuomintang
Lienchiang County		Cheng Hsueh-sheng	Kuomintang
Keelung City		Jonathan Lin	Kuomintang
Hsinchu City		Cheng Cheng-chien	Kuomintang
Chiayi City		Wang Mei-hui	Democratic Progressive Party
Lowland Aboriginal	I	Jeng Tian-tsair (Sra Kacaw)	Kuomintang
Lowland Aboriginal	II	Chen Ying (Asenay Daliyalrep)	Democratic Progressive Party
Lowland Aboriginal	III	Huang Jen (Kin Cyang)	Kuomintang
Highland Aboriginal	I	Kao Chin Su-mei (Ciwas Ali)	Independent (Caucuses with KMT)
Highland Aboriginal	II	Wu Li-hua (Saidhai Tahovecahe)	Democratic Progressive Party
Highland Aboriginal	III	Lu Hsien-yi (Sasuyu Ruljuwan)	Kuomintang

=== Party-list proportional representation ===
No.	Name	Party	Remarks
1	Lin Yueh-chin	Democratic Progressive Party	
2	Puma Shen	Democratic Progressive Party	
3	Ariel Chang	Democratic Progressive Party	
~~4~~	~~Hung Sun-han~~	Democratic Progressive Party	Resigned on 24 November 2024 after appointed as Minister of Labor
5	Loh Meei-ling	Democratic Progressive Party	
~~6~~	~~You Si-kun~~	Democratic Progressive Party	Resigned on 2 February 2024 after failed re-election for President of the Legislative Yuan
7	Fan Yun	Democratic Progressive Party	
8	Ker Chien-ming	Democratic Progressive Party	
9	Shen Fa-hui	Democratic Progressive Party	
10	Chuang Jui-hsiung	Democratic Progressive Party	
11	Michelle Lin	Democratic Progressive Party	
12	Jean Kuo	Democratic Progressive Party	
13	Wang Cheng-hsu	Democratic Progressive Party	Replaced You Si-kun
14	Wang Yi-chuan	Democratic Progressive Party	Replaced Hung Sun-han
15	Chen Pei-yu	Democratic Progressive Party	
No.	Name	Party	
1	Han Kuo-yu	Kuomintang	President of the Legislative Yuan
2	Ko Chih-en	Kuomintang	
3	Ko Ju-chun	Kuomintang	
4	Weng Hsiao-ling	Kuomintang	
5	Chen Jing-hui	Kuomintang	
6	Wu Tsung-hsien	Kuomintang	
7	Lin Chien-chi	Kuomintang	
8	Chen Yeong-kang	Kuomintang	
9	Hsu Yu-chen	Kuomintang	
10	Hsieh Lung-chieh	Kuomintang	
11	Su Ching-chuan	Kuomintang	
12	Chang Chia-chun	Kuomintang	
13	Wang Yu-min	Kuomintang	
No.	Name	Party	
1	~~Huang Shan-shan~~	Taiwan People's Party	Resigned under "two-year clause"
2	~~Huang Kuo-chang~~	Taiwan People's Party	Resigned under "two-year clause"
3	Chen Gau-tzu	Taiwan People's Party	
4	~~Wu Chun-cheng~~	Taiwan People's Party	Resigned on 25 February 2025 due to conflict of interest over "Strong Generation" project
5	~~Mai Yu-zhen~~	Taiwan People's Party	Resigned under "two-year clause"
6	~~Lin Kuo-cheng~~	Taiwan People's Party	Resigned under "two-year clause"
7	~~Lin Yi-chun~~	Taiwan People's Party	Resigned under "two-year clause"
8	~~Chang Chi-kai~~	Taiwan People's Party	Resigned under "two-year clause"
9	Liu Shu-pin	Taiwan People's Party	Replaced Wu Chun-cheng
10	Hung Yu-shiang	Taiwan People's Party	Replaced Huang Shan-shan
11	Tsai Chun-chou	Taiwan People's Party	Replaced Huang Kuo-chang
12	Wang An-hsiang	Taiwan People's Party	Replaced Mai Yu-zhen
13	Chiu Hui-ju	Taiwan People's Party	Replaced Lin Kuo-cheng
14	Chen Ching-lung	Taiwan People's Party	Replaced Lin Yi-chun
15	~~Li Zhenxiu~~	Taiwan People's Party	Replaced Chang Chi-kai; ousted after expelled from party
16	Hsu Chung-hsin	Taiwan People's Party	Replaced Li Chen-hsiu
