= Rukai language =

Formosan language spoken in Taiwan

Rukai
- Drekay / Drekai
- Native to: Taiwan
- Region: Pingtung County; Kaohsiung County; Taitung County
- Ethnicity: Rukai
- Native speakers: 10,500 (2002)
- Language family: Austronesian: Rukai
- Dialects: Budai; Labuan; Maga; Mantauran; Tanan; Tona
- Writing system: Latin (Rukai alphabet)

Language codes
- ISO 639-3: dru
- Glottolog: ruka1240
- Linguasphere: 30-HAA-a
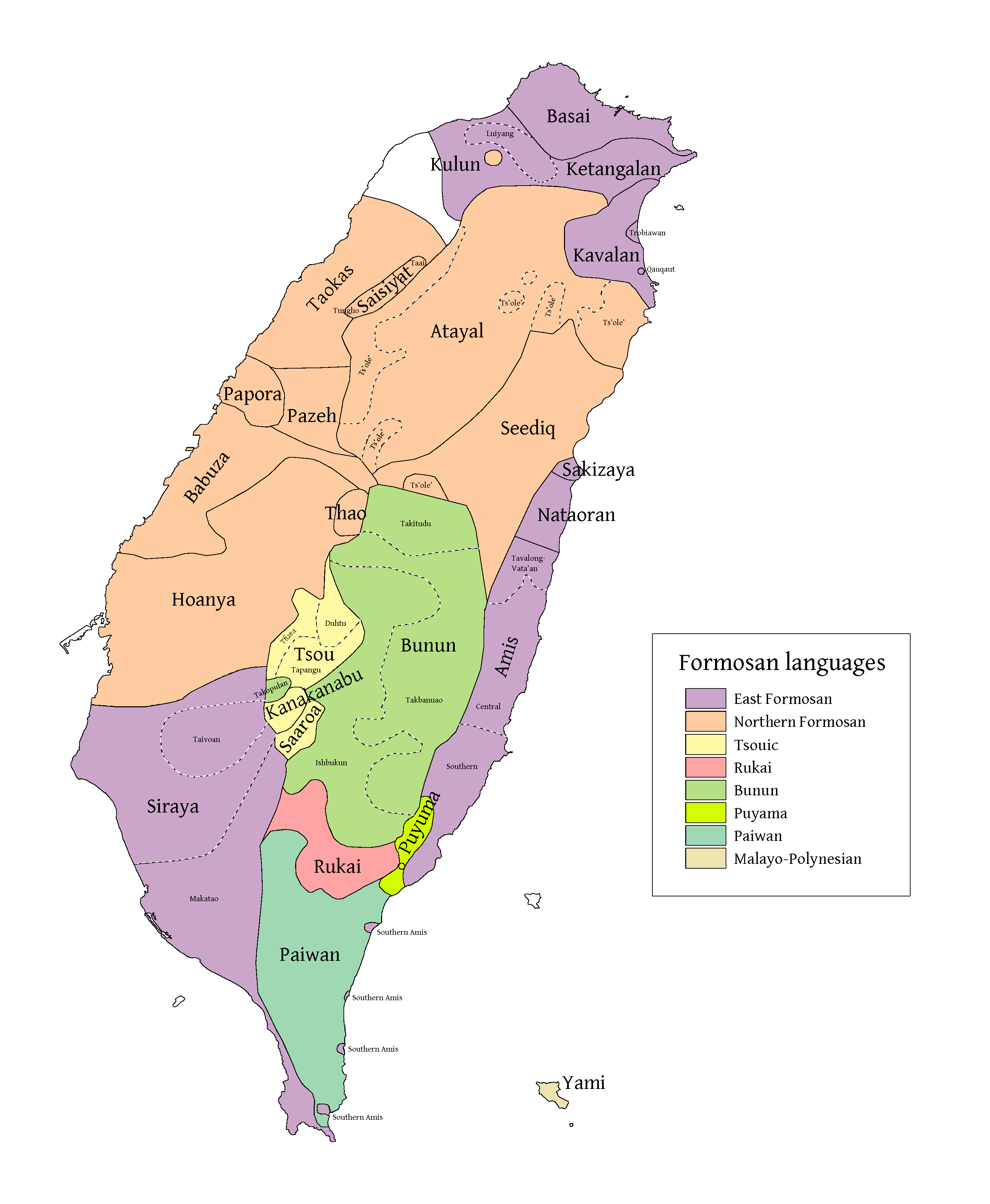
- Distribution of the Rukai language (in pink) on the island of Taiwan

- Rukai is classified as Vulnerable by the UNESCO Atlas of the World's Languages in Danger

Rukai is a Formosan language spoken by the Rukai people in Taiwan. It is a member of the Austronesian language family. The Rukai language comprises six dialects, which are Budai, Labuan, Maga, Mantauran, Tanan and Tona. The number of speakers of the six Rukai dialects is estimated to be about 10,000. Some of them are monolingual. There are varying degrees of mutual intelligibility among the Rukai dialects. Rukai is notable for its distinct grammatical voice system among the Formosan languages.

== Classification ==
Paul Jen-kuei Li considers Rukai to be the first language to have split from the Proto-Austronesian language. Below are the estimated divergence dates of various Formosan languages from Li (2008:215).

1. Proto-Austronesian: 4,500 BCE
2. Rukai: 3,000 BCE
3. Tsouic: 2,500 BCE (split into Tsou and Southern Tsouic around 1,000 BCE)
4. Most other splits: 2,000 to 0 BCE
5. Western Plains: 1,000 CE

Classifications by various scholars repeatedly find that Rukai is one of the, and often the, most divergent of the Austronesian languages. It is therefore prime evidence for reconstructing Proto-Austronesian. Ross (2009) noted that up to that point, reconstructions had not taken Rukai into account, and therefore could not be considered valid for the entire family.

== Dialects ==
Rukai is unique for being the only Formosan language without a focus system.

Tanan Rukai is also the Formosan language with the largest consonant inventory, with 23 consonants and 4 vowels having length contrast. Tanan Rukai also makes an animate/inanimate instead of a personal/non-personal one as most other Formosan languages do.

Mantauran is one of the most divergent dialects. Li (2001) classifies them as follows:

- Rukai
  - Mantauran (萬山 Wanshan, also ʼoponoho): 250–300 speakers
    - Maga–Tona
      - Maga (馬加 Majia)
      - Tona (多納 Duona)
    - Budai–Tanan (Rukai Proper)
      - Budai (霧台 Wutai)
      - Tanan (大南 Danan; also Taromak)

== Geographic distribution ==
According to Zeitoun (2007:4), there are a total of 6 Rukai dialects spoken in 12 different villages.

Rukai Villages by Dialect
Dialect	Autonym	Village	Township
Tanan	Taromak	Tunghsin 東興	Peinan Township, Taitung County
Labuan	Laboa(n)	Tawu 大武	Wutai Township, Pingtung County
Labuan	Talamakao	Chinye	Wutai Township, Pingtung County
Budai	Vedrai	Wutai 霧臺	Wutai Township, Pingtung County
Budai	Kucapungan	Haocha 好茶	Wutai Township, Pingtung County
Budai	Adiri	Ali 阿禮	Wutai Township, Pingtung County
Budai	Kalramomodhesae	Chiamu 佳暮	Wutai Township, Pingtung County
Budai	Kinulan	Chulu 吉露	Wutai Township, Pingtung County
Maga	Teldrɨka	Maolin 茂林	Maolin Township, Kaohsiung County
Tona	Kongadavane	Tona 多納	Maolin Township, Kaohsiung County
Mantauran	ʼoponoho	Wanshan 萬山	Maolin Township, Kaohsiung County

Together, Maga, Tona, and Mantauran are also known as the "Lower Three Villages." Rukai have also recently in Sandimen Township and southern Sanhe Village, Majia Township, where there are many Paiwan. Sanhe Village is also where the Budai Rukai originally lived in before they relocated to Wutai Township in the mid-1900s.

== Phonology ==
Most Rukai dialects have four vowels and retroflex and interdental consonants.

Budai Rukai has four vowels, /i ə a u/. Words ending phonemically in a consonant add an echo vowel, one of /i ə u/, which unlike morphophonemic vowels is often lost in derivation. /ə/ is used when the last vowel of the stem is /a/.

Budai Rukai consonants
		Labial	Dental	Alveolar	Retroflex	Palatal	Velar
Nasal		m		n			ŋ
Stop	voiceless	p		t			k
Stop	voiced	b		d	ɖ		g
Affricate				t͡s			
Fricative	voiceless		θ	s			
Fricative	voiced	v	ð				
Trill				r			
Approximant		w		l	ɭ	j	

Due to influence from Paiwan and Chinese, younger speakers sometimes pronounce /ð/ as [z], and in Tanan Rukai, younger speakers may merge /θ/ into /s/.

In Mantauran Rukai, the voiced stops have spirantized: *b to /v/, *d and *ɖ to /ð/, and *g to /h/.

The following table displays the consonant inventory of Mantauran Rukai, with written representations that differ from their IPA representations given in angle brackets (Zeitoun 2007):

Mantauran Rukai consonants
	Labial	Dental	Alveolar	Retroflex	Velar	Glottal
Nasal	m		n		ŋ ⟨ng⟩	
Stop	p		t		k	ʔ ⟨’⟩
Affricate			ts ⟨c⟩			
Fricative	v	ð ⟨dh⟩	s			h
Trill			r			
Approximant			l	ɭ ⟨lr⟩		

- 4 vowels, written a, i, e, o

== Grammar ==
=== Morphology ===
Basic Mantauran Rukai syllables take on a basic (C)V structure, with words usually ranging from 2 to 4 syllables long (Zeitoun 2007). There are four morphological processes.

1. Affixation
2. Stem modification
3. Reduplication
4. Compounding

The following reduplication patterns occur in Budai Rukai (Austronesian Comparative Dictionary).

Reduplication of the noun stem

- N + RED 'a great amount'
- N(umeral or period) + RED 'lasting for a period of...'

Reduplication of the verb stem

- V + RED 'continuous, keep doing, do repeatedly'
- V + RED 'future'
- V (stative) + RED 'intensity, comparatively greater'

In Budai Rukai, reduplication of a bound stem can also be used to create certain basic nouns and verbs, such as 'thunder,' 'mountain,' and 'to scrape' (Austronesian Comparative Dictionary).

Based on an analysis of the Budai (Kucapungan) dialect, Rukai is said to be unusual among Formosan languages for having a dichotomous active-passive voice system, (Chen & Sung, 2005) which may include voices such agent, patient, locative, or instrumental focus. Stanley Starosta considers this to be an indication that Rukai is the first offshoot of the Austronesian language family (Zeitoun, 2007). However, this dichotomy has been challenged (Chen, 2005).

- Active / Agent Focus (AF): prefix u-/w-
- Passive / Patient Focus (PF): prefix ki-

=== Syntax ===
Unlike most other Formosan languages, Rukai has a nominative-accusative case-marking system instead of an ergative one typical of Austronesian-aligned languages (Zeitoun 2007). There are two types of clauses in Mantauran Rukai:

1. Nominal
2. Verbal

Complementalization can take on four strategies (Zeitoun 2007).

1. Zero strategy (i.e. paratactic complements)
2. Verb serialization
3. Nominalization
4. Causativization

Definite objects can be topicalized in both active and passive sentences.

=== Function words ===
Below are some Mantauran Rukai function words from Zeitoun (2007).

- la – and
- mani – then

=== Word classes ===
Zeitoun (2007) distinguishes eleven word classes in Mantauran Rukai:.

1. Nouns
2. Verbs
3. Pronouns
4. Demonstratives
5. Numerals
6. Adverbs
7. Phrasal elements
8. Clausal elements
9. Interclausal elements
10. Exclamations
11. Interjections

=== Verbs ===
Below are some Mantauran Rukai verb affixes from Zeitoun (2007).

- Dynamic verbs: o-; very rarely om- and m-
- Stative verbs: ma-
- Negating prefix: ki-
- Causative: pa-
- ʔini-Ca- "(one)self"
- mati- "well"
- k-in-a ... aə "... more"
- ʔako- "barely, just"
- ka- "in fact"
- mata ... aə "certainly"

=== Pronouns ===
Below are Rukai pronouns from Zeitoun (1997). Note that Mantauran Rukai pronouns are usually bound.

Mantauran Rukai Personal Pronouns
Type of Pronoun			Topic	Nominative	Oblique	Genitive
1st person	singular		iɭaə	-ɭao, nao-	-i-a-ə	-li
1st person	plural	exclusive	inamə	-nai	-i-nam-ə	-nai
1st person	plural	inclusive	imitə, ita	-mita, -ta	-i-mit-ə	-ta
2nd person	singular		imiaʔə	-moʔo	i-miaʔ-ə	-ʔo
2nd person	plural		inomə	-nomi	-i-nom-ə	-nomi
3rd person	visible	singular	ana	–	-i-n-ə	-(n)i
3rd person	visible	plural	ana-lo	–	-i-l-i-n-ə	-l-i-ni
3rd person	not visible	singular	ðona	–	-i-ð-ə	-ða
3rd person	not visible	plural	ðona-lo	–	-i-l-i-ð-ə	-l-i-ða

Budai Rukai Personal Pronouns
Type of Pronoun			Topic	Nominative	Oblique	Genitive
1st person	singular		kunaku	-(n)aku, naw-	nakuanə	-li
1st person	plural	exclusive	kunai	-nai	naianə	-nai
1st person	plural	inclusive	kuta	-ta	mitaanə	-ta
2nd person	singular		kusu	-su	musuanə	-su
2nd person	plural		kunumi	-numi, -nu	numianə	-numi
3rd person	visible	singular	kuini	–	inianə	-ini
3rd person	visible	plural	kuini	–	inianə	-ini
3rd person	not visible	singular	kuiɖa	–	–	–
3rd person	not visible	plural	kuiɖa	–	–	–

Maga Rukai Personal Pronouns
Type of Pronoun			Topic	Nominative	Oblique	Genitive
1st person	singular		i kɨkɨ	ku-, kɨkɨ	ŋkua	-li
1st person	plural	exclusive	i knamɨ	namɨ-, knamɨ	nmaa	-namɨ
1st person	plural	inclusive	i miti	ta-, miti	mitia	-ta
2nd person	singular		i musu	su-, musu	sua	-su
2nd person	plural		i mumu	mu-, mumu	mua	-mu
3rd person	visible	singular	i kini	kini	nia	-ini
3rd person	visible	plural	i kini	kini	nia	-ini
3rd person	not visible	singular	i kiɖi	kiɖi	ɖia	-ɖa
3rd person	not visible	plural	i kiɖi	kiɖi	ɖia	-ɖa

== Affixes ==
=== Budai Rukai ===
The list of Budai Rukai affixes below is sourced from Chen (2006:199-203).

Prefixes

- a- 'become'
- ana- 'if'
- api- 'like', 'want'
- i- 'at', 'in'
- ki- 'to gather', 'to collect'
- ki- 'Dative Focus'
- ki- 'to dig
- ku- 'to remove'
- ku- 'Free Pronoun marker'
- ku- 'Past marker'
- la- 'Plural'
- lu- 'Future'
- ma- 'Stative Verb'
- ma- 'reciprocal'
- ma- 'dual (two people)'
- mu- 'to remove'
- mu- 'self-motion'
- muasaka- 'ordinal'
- nai- 'have done'
- ŋi- 'to move in certain direction'
- ŋi- '-self'
- ŋu- 'to ride'
- pa- 'causative'
- paŋu- 'by'
- sa- 'body parts'
- sa- 'when'
- si- 'verbal prefix'
- si- 'to wear'
- sini- 'from'
- su- 'to clean'
- su- 'belong'
- ta- 'to feel'
- taru- 'certain'
- tu- 'to mark'
- tua- 'to wash'
- θi- 'to release'
- u-/w- 'Agent Focus'

Suffixes

- -a 'imperative'
- -a 'Accusative Case'
- -ana 'still', 'yet'
- -anə 'nominalize'
- -ŋa 'completive'
- -ŋa 'close to'

Infixes

- ⟨a⟩ 'past tense; non-future'
- ⟨a⟩ 'realis'
- ⟨in⟩ 'Goal subject', 'Past time'

Circumfixes

- a⟩...⟨anə 'future state'
- a⟩...⟨anə 'nominalizer'
- ka⟩...⟨anə 'real or genuine'
- kala⟩...⟨anə 'season'
- sa⟩...⟨anə 'ins>rument'
- sanu⟩...⟨anə 'left-over'
- sanu⟩...⟨lə 'frequency'
- ta⟩...⟨anə 'time', 'location'

Compound (Multiple) Affixes

- la-ma- 'plural marker'
- ɭi-tara- 'have to', must'
- sa-ka- 'household'
- sa-ka-u⟩...⟨anə; the whole'
- sa-ka-si-... l-anə the ... generation
- ta-ra- for a period of time
- ta-ra- be good at
- t-in-u⟩...⟨anə personal relation

=== Mantauran Rukai ===
The following list of Mantauran Rukai affixes is sourced from Zeitoun (2007).

- a- 'when'
- a- (action/state nominalization)
- a- 'plural'
- -a 'beyond (in time or space)'
- -a 'irrealis'
- -a 'imperative'
- -ae (state nominalization)
- a⟩...⟨ae; allomorph: ... -ae (objective nominalization; negative imperative)
- amo- 'will'
- -ane (meaning unknown; used on verbs to insult someone)
- -a-nga 'imperative' (mild requests)
- apaa- 'reciprocal causative' (dynamic verbs)
- apano- 'like to, prone to, have a tendency to'
- apa'a 'reciprocal causative' (stative verbs)
- apa'ohi- 'split (causative form)'
- -ci 'snivel'
- dh- 'invisible'
- i- 'at'
- -i 'irrealis'
- -i⟩...⟨e (marking of the oblique case on personal and impersonal pronouns)
- -ka 'predicative negation'
- ka- 'in fact, indeed, actually'
- ka⟩...⟨ae 'genuine, real, original'
- kala⟩...⟨ae 'temporal nominalization'
- kapa ~ kama- 'continuously'
- kapa ...-nga 'all, every'
- ki- 'modal negation'
- ki⟩...⟨ae 'whose'
- k⟨in⟩a⟩...⟨ae 'more and more'
- la- 'plural'
- la-ma'a- 'reciprocal'
- -lo 'plural' (demonstrative pronouns)
- m- (dynamic (finite and subjunctive) verbs; alternates with k-, p-, or Ø in its non-finite form)
- ma- (stative (finite and subjunctive) verbs; alternates with ka- in its non-finite form)
- ma⟩...⟨le (forms 'tens')
- ma-Ca- 'reciprocity' (dynamic (finite and subjunctive) verbs; alternates with pa-Ca; Ca refers to the reduplication of the first consonant)
- maa- 'reciprocity' (dynamic (finite and subjunctive) verbs; alternates with paa)
- maa⟩...⟨e (~ paa⟩...⟨e; maa- (dual reciprocal) + -e (meaning unknown))
- maaraka- 'each/both'
- maatali⟩...⟨le/lo '(a number of) floors'
- maka- 'finish'
- maka⟩...⟨le/lo (~ paka⟩...⟨le/lo) 'up to N-/for N- days/months/years'
- maka'an- (attaches only to aleve 'below' and lrahalre 'above')
- makini⟩...⟨(a)e (~ pakini⟩...⟨(a)e) 'all'
- Mali- (~ pali) 'along'
- ma'ohi (~ pa'ohi) 'split'
- m-o- (~ o-) 'holds X's ritual (where X = household name)' (attaches to household names to form dynamic verbs)
- m-o- (~ o-) 'toward'
- mo- 'anti-causative'
- m-ore (~ ore-) 'perform'
- mota'a- (~ ota'a-) 'raise'
- n- 'visible'
- -na 'still'
- naa- 'continuously'
- -nae 'place where'
- -nae 'time when'
- -nga 'already'
- -nga 'superlative'
- ni- 'counterfactuality (irrealis)'
- ni⟩...⟨a 'concessive'
- o- 'dynamic / finite / realis / active'
- o⟩...⟨e 'dress well' (derives verbs from nouns)
- o-ara- 'only' (attached to verbs)
- o-ka'a⟩...⟨le/lo (~ ko'a⟩...⟨le/lo) 'a number of recipients'
- om- (~ m- / ~ Ø) 'dynamic / finite / realis / active'
- o-tali (~ tali- / ~ toli) 'wrap up, pack up'
- o-tali (~ tali-) 'made of'
- o-tara- (~ tara-) 'a number of months / years'
- taro- (doublet form: tao-) 'group of persons in movement'
- o-ta'i- (~ ta'i-) 'precede'
- o-'ara- (~ 'ara-) 'early'
- pa- 'causative'
- pa- 'every N-times'
- paori 'stick to, think about'
- pa'a⟩...⟨ae '(what is) left'
- pe- 'forbiddance (?)'
- pi- 'local causative'
- po- 'causative of movement'
- po- 'bear, grow N' (attaches to nouns)
- saka- 'external'
- samori- 'keep on ...-ing' (attaches only to the root kane 'to eat')
- sa'api- 'prone to, inclined to'
- so- 'tribute'
- ta- (subjective nominalization)
- ta- 'inalienability' (kinship and color terms)
- ta⟩...⟨(a)e 'place where'
- ta⟩...⟨ae 'time when'
- ta⟩...⟨n-ae (forms derived locative nominal)
- taka- 'a number of persons'
- tako- 'while'
- tala- 'container' (?; found only with the root ove'eke)
- tali- 'belong to'
- ta'a- 'with (a group of persons)'
- ta'a⟩...⟨le/lo 'measure with an extended arm' (bound numerals)
- to- 'do, make, produce, build'
- toka⟩...⟨(a)e 'use ... for, by ...-ing'
- to'a- 'use ... to, for'
- 'a- 'instrument/manner nominalizer'
- 'a⟩...⟨e 'have a lot of'
- 'aa- 'turn into'
- 'aka- 'Nth' (ordinal prefix 'a- + stative marker ka- (non-finite form))
- 'ako- (doublet form: 'ako⟩...⟨ae) 'speak (out)'
- 'ako- 'barely, a little'
- 'ako⟩...⟨le 'say a number of times'
- 'ako⟩...⟨nga 'more'
- 'ali- 'from (in time or space)' (< 'aliki '(come) from')
- 'ano- 'walk, ride, take'
- 'ano- 'unknown meaning' (only attaches to stative roots)
- 'ano-Ca- 'along/with a number of persons (in movement)' (attaches to bound numeral forms and certain other roots)
- 'ano⟩...⟨ae 'entirely, completely, cease, alleviate'
- 'ao⟩...⟨le/lo 'the Nth time' (ordinal prefix 'a- + 'o⟩...⟨le/lo 'a number of times')
- 'apaka⟩...⟨le/lo 'the Nth day' (ordinal prefix 'a- + paka⟩...⟨le/lo 'up to/for a number of days / months / years)
- 'api- 'like ... -ing'
- 'a-po- 'as a result of'
- 'apo- 'come out'
- 'asa⟩...⟨ae 'what's the use of'
- 'asi- (meaning unknown; found only once in the word 'work')
- 'i- 'passive'
- 'i- 'verbalizer' (from nouns; polysemous prefix). Semantic core of 'i-N is 'get, obtain-N', although it can also be glossed as 'get, harvest, gather, look after, bear, have for, kill, etc.'
- 'i- 'put on, wear' (derives verbs from nouns)
- 'ia-... ae 'because of, out of'
- 'ini- 'movement toward'
- 'ini- 'cross'
- 'ini- 'consume'
- 'ini-Ca- '(one)self' (reflexive)
- 'ini⟩...⟨ae 'pretend'
- 'ini⟩...⟨(-ae) 'behave like, look like' (derived from 'inilrao 'resemble')
- 'ira- 'for' (derived from 'iraki '(do) for')
- 'o- 'take off'
- 'o⟩...⟨le/lo 'a number of times' (attaches to bound numerals)
- 'o⟩...⟨le/lo 'measure' (must be followed by certain words to indicate a measure with the hand, foot, ruler, etc.)
- 'o-tali 'unpack'

The following list of Budai Rukai affixes is sourced from the Comparative Austronesian Dictionary (1995).

Nominal affixes

- ka⟩...⟨anə + N 'something real or genuine
- ko- + Pronoun 'nominative'
- moasaka- + N (numeral) 'ordinal'
- sa-... anə + V 'instrument, tool'
- sa- + N 'some body parts'
- ta⟩...⟨anə + N 'location, time'
- ta-ra + N 'agentive, a person specialised in...'

Verbal affixes

- -a- + V 'realis'
- -a + V 'imperative'
- ki- + N 'to gather, to collect, to harvest'
- ki- + V 'dative-focus, involuntary action'
- ko- + N 'to remove, to peel'
- ko- + V 'intransitive, patient-focus'
- ma- + V 'mutual, reciprocal'
- maa- + V 'stative'
- mo- + N 'to discharge, remove'
- mo- + V '(to go) self-motion, non-causative'
- ŋi- + V 'to act or to move in a certain direction or manner'
- ŋo- + N 'to ride'
- pa- + V 'causative'
- si- + V (bound stem) 'verbal prefix'
- si- + N 'to wear, to carry, to possess'
- so- + N 'to spit, to clean, to give out'
- to- + N 'to make, produce, bring forth'
- θi + N 'to release'
- w- + V 'agent-focus, verbal prefix'
