= National Pingtung University of Education =

University in Pingtung, Taiwan; now part of National Pingtung University

Coordinates: 22.6698°N 120.4986°E

National Pingtung University of Education 國立屏東教育大學
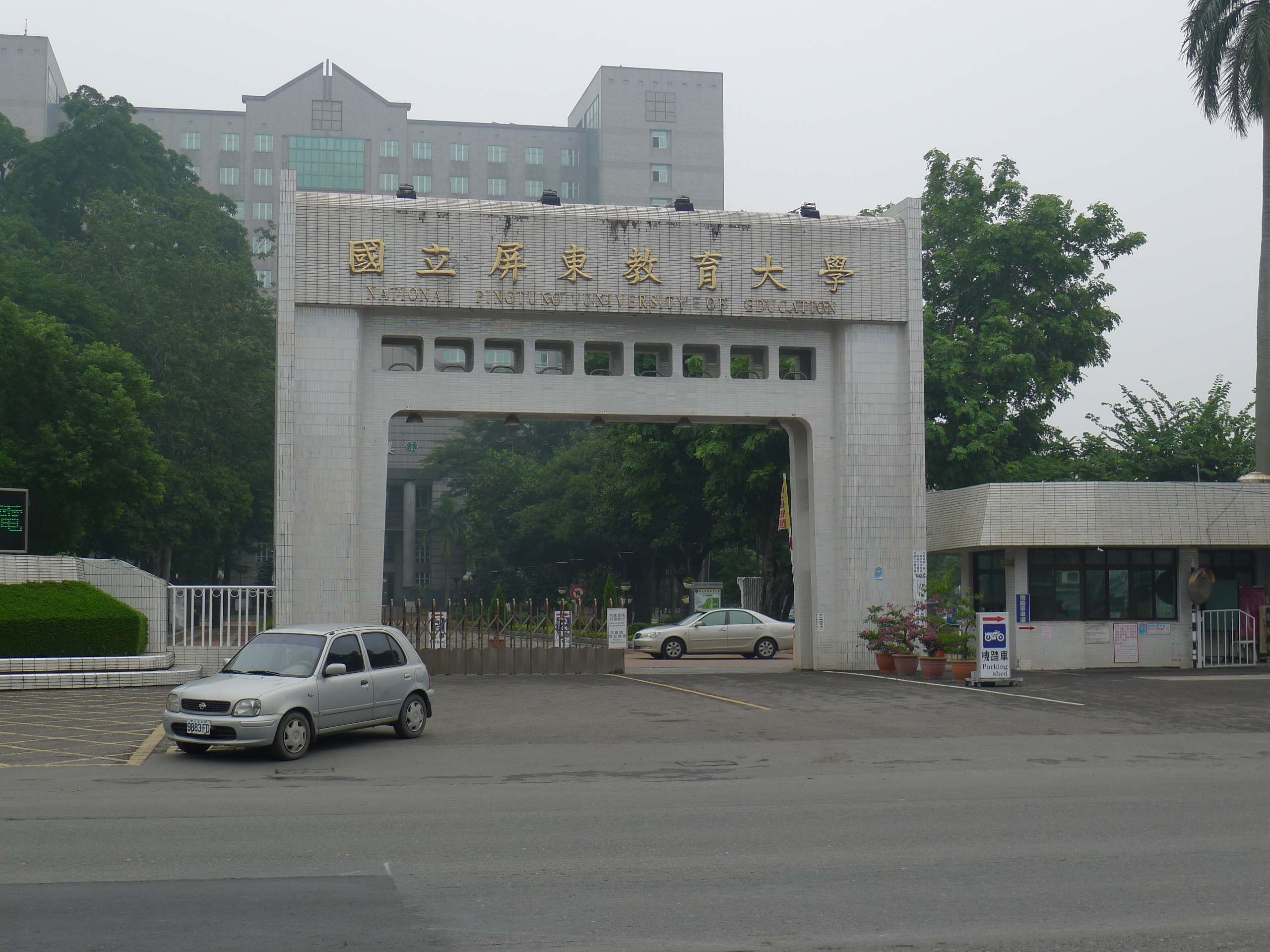
- Established: 1 August 2005 (as NPUE); 1 August 2014 (as National Pingtung University)
- Location: Pingtung City, Pingtung County, Taiwan
- Website: www.npue.edu.tw

National Pingtung University of Education (NPUE; Chinese: 國立屏東教育大學; pinyin: Guólì Píngdōng Jiàoyù Dàxué) was an institution of higher learning in Pingtung City, Pingtung County, Taiwan. It has now become part of National Pingtung University.

== Academics ==
There were 14 departments at the university, including Elementary Education, Educational Psychology and Counseling, Early Childhood Education, Special Education, Mathematics Education, Physical Education, Natural Science Education, Physics and Geoscience, Computer Science, Language and Literature Education, Social Studies Education, Music Education, Visual Arts Education, English Education, Taiwan Cultural Industries Management.

== Address ==
The National Pingtung University of Education was located in southern Taiwan at No. 4-18 Ming Shen Road, Pingtung, Taiwan (Republic of China). It has since merged with another institution and is now National Pingtung University.

== Notable alumni ==
- Chen Tao-ming, member of Legislative Yuan (2001–2004)
- Lin Chun-te, member of Legislative Yuan (1999–2008)
- Uliw Qaljupayare, member of Legislative Yuan (2008–2020)
- Wu Tse-yuan, Magistrate of Pingtung County (1993–1997)

== Transportation ==
The university is accessible within walking distance East from the Pingtung Station of Taiwan Railway.

== See also ==
- List of universities in Taiwan
