= Taiwan Number One Party =

Political party in Taiwan

The Taiwan Number One Party (Chinese: 台灣吾黨; pinyin: Táiwān Wúdǎng) was a minor political party in Taiwan.

== See also ==
- List of political parties in the Republic of China
