= Rukai people =

Indigenous people of Taiwan

Rukai Drekay
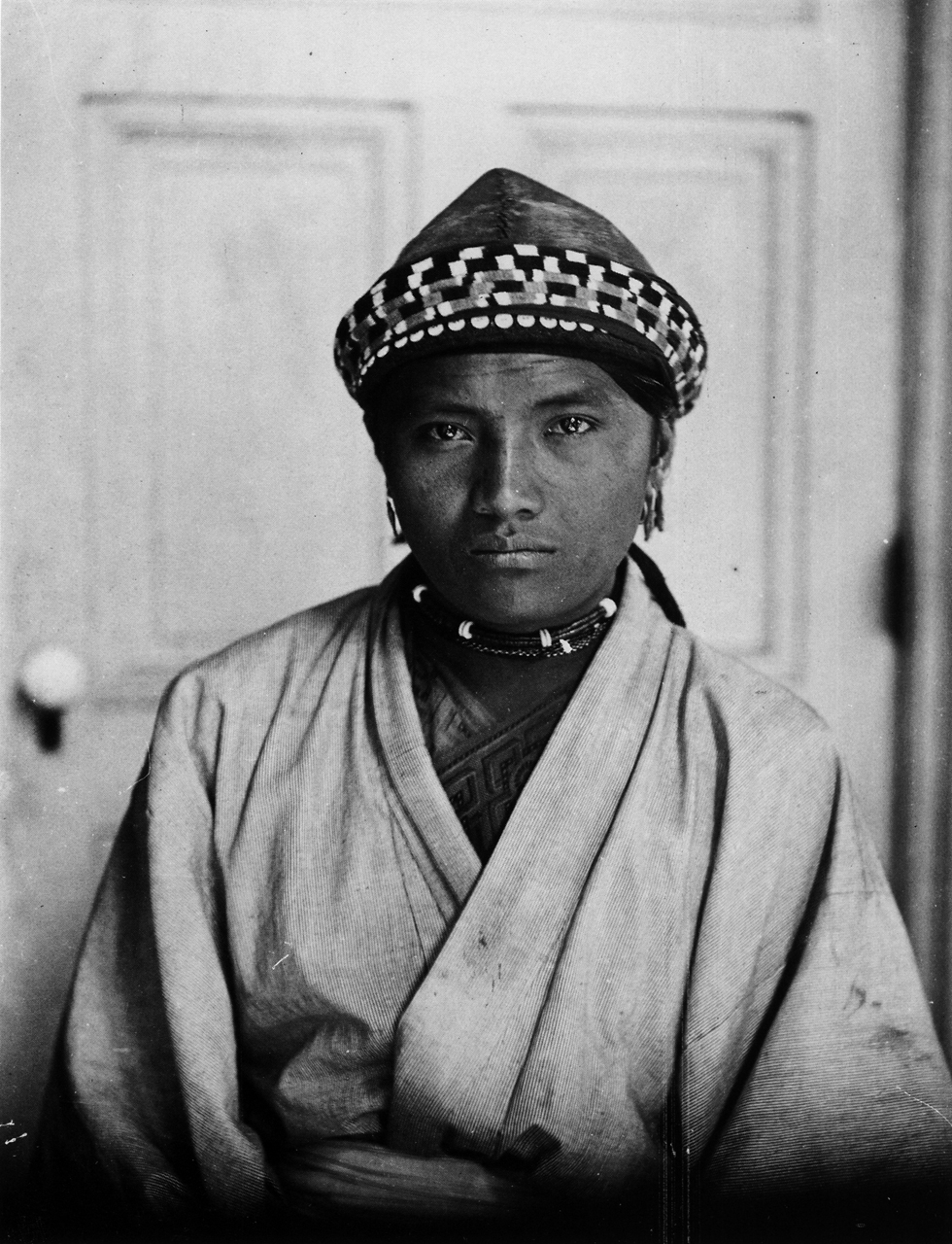
- A Rukai village chief visiting Department of Anthropology in Tokyo Imperial University during the Japanese rule.

Total population
- 12,699 (2014)

Regions with significant populations
- Taiwan

Languages
- Rukai, Mandarin

Religion
- Animism, Christianity

Related ethnic groups
- Paiwan, Taiwanese

The Rukai (Rukai: Drekay; Mandarin: 魯凱族; pinyin: Lǔkǎi zú) are one of the indigenous people of Taiwan. They consist of six communities residing in southern Taiwan (Budai, Labuan, Tanan, Maga, Mantauran, and Tona), each of which has its own dialect of the Rukai language. As of the year 2014, the Rukai numbered 12,699, and is the seventh-largest of the 13 officially recognized indigenous groups in Taiwan. The Rukai were formerly called Tsarisen or Tsalisen, which means "people living in the mountain".

The Rukai people honored the clouded leopard (Neofelis nebulosa) and the hundred pacer (Deinagkistrodon acutus), which they believe to be the spirit of their ancestor.

== Traditional dress and textile ==
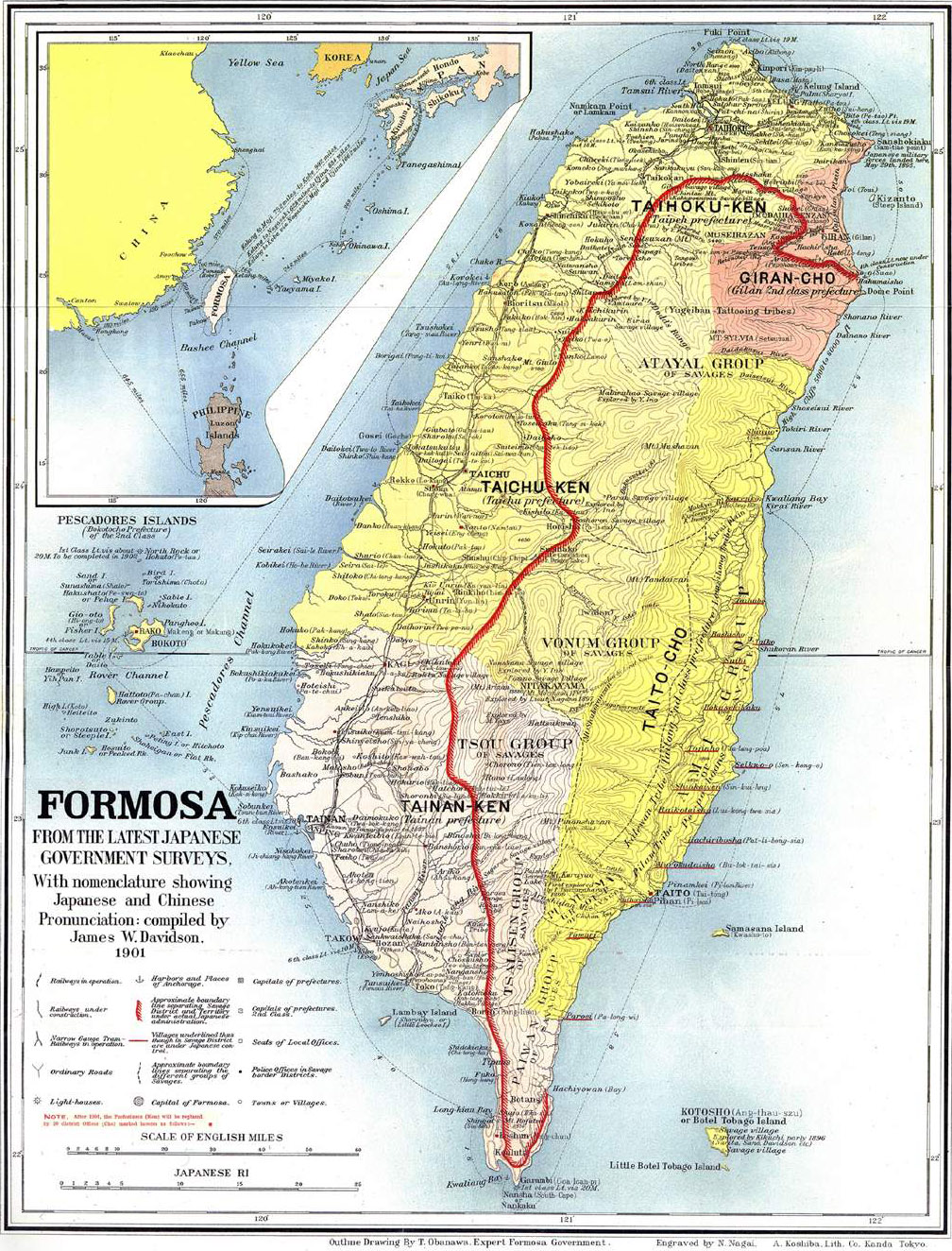
Taiwan in 1901, with the Rukai marked as "Tsalisen Group of Savages" in the southern part of the island.

The traditional dress of Rukai people has many similarities with that of the Paiwan people, probably due to the similarity of their geographical distribution and hereditary aristocratic social structure. The traditional dress and textile of the Rukai people also possesses original and distinctive qualities and characteristics. Rukai people's dress include both ceremonial attire and casual wear. Men's ceremonial attire includes headwear with insignia, headscarves, tops, skirts, shawls, and leggings, while women wear garlands, headscarves, earrings, necklaces, lazurite necklaces, bead bracelets, arm rings, long gowns, skirts, girdles, leggings, and shoulder ornaments. In terms of casual wear, men wear leather headgear, headscarves, tops, shoulder straps, girdles, leather raincoats, deer hide coats, deer hide leggings, tobacco bags, and gunpowder bags, while women wear headscarves, long robes, skirts, leggings, gloves, mesh belts, leather raincoats, and cloth bags. Rukai social structure, hereditary aristocracy, is reflected in every facet of their lives, including attire. Generally, only the nobility are permitted to dress up and the commoners dress plainly and simply, although commoners can buy jewels from the nobility, usually bartering with pigs, millet, and pots. The nobility used to buy cotton, silk and woollen from the Han people to make clothes.

=== Cloth making and dyeing ===
Like the traditional dress of all other indigenous groups in Taiwan, the traditional dress of Rukai people uses cloth made by the squared cloth system. The main tool is the horizontal loom and the traditional material of the Rukai dress is linen, but under the influence of the Han people they have also begun using cotton and wool. Rukai people make linen from flax and use a horizontal loom with a strap to weave the linen into exquisite and beautiful cloth, and then sew pieces of cloth together to make garments. Making cloth is a duty particular to women in Rukai society, and when women are making cloth in a little house, men cannot enter.

Cloth is usually dyed red, yellow, brown, dark blue or green with dyes made from herbs or plants. The red colorant is extracted from the root of a specific vine by chopping the roots into pieces and soaking them in water. The yellow colorant usually comes from ginger root juice. The brown colorant comes from the Dioscorea matsudae, and is extracted with the same method used to make the red dye. The dark blue dye comes from the leaf juice of a plant called danadana, and the green colorant comes from the leaf juice of a plant called rasras.

=== Four manufacturing techniques ===
Traditionally, the Rukai people's dresses were made entirely by hand, which required the meticulous and lengthy hand work of fine craftsmen. Even though nowadays it is becoming more and more common to use computer scanning programs to design the cut and style of the clothes, and apply the embroidery and other details mechanically, handmade embroidered garments remain the most valued kind of attire among the Rukai.

There are four essential manufacturing techniques:

1. Inlay. Inlay is a technique that using different colors of linens as weft to knit through the other linens as warp in order to create geometry patterns in the cloth.
2. Stitch embroidery. Traditionally, Rukai people use needles made of bamboo for stitch embroidery, but since the Han people introduced the metal needles into Taiwan, like the other indigenous people in Taiwan, Rukai people use metal needles instead. In the old days, the stitch lines used by Rukai people came from the colorful cloth brought from the plain and they got the stitch lines by tearing the colorful cloth apart, until period of the Japanese colonization could they directly brought the stitch lines. There are five methods of embroidery used by the Rukai people, cross-stitch embroidery, chain stitch embroidery, straight stitch embroidery, circle stitch embroidery, and satin stitch embroidery. Among them, the satin stitch embroidery is the most delicate technique, requiring the most meticulous hand work, and the technique can only be found in Rukai traditional dress. There is no restriction of direction while embroidering, but every stitch line, whether long or short, should be placed side by side tidily. Overlapping and gaps between them are forbidden. If the embroiderer makes one mistake, she has to undo it and embroider it from the beginning.
3. Pearl embroidery. Traditionally, Rukai people used glass beads with a single color to design a pattern and then embroidered it on the cloth. Nowadays, plastic beads are more commonly used.
4. Patch embroidery. Rukai people usually cut the black cloth in a particular pattern and then sew it onto the white or blue cloth; or cut the white cloth in a particular pattern and then sew it onto the black cloth.

=== Patterns ===
The patterns of the Rukai people's traditional dress include the sun, hundred pacer, human head, human figure, string, pig, rhombus, and deer patterns, but the sun and the hundred pacer pattern are the most popular ones. The rhombus pattern, which Rukai people regard as the symbol of the hundred pacer, is usually made with satin stitch embroidery. The anise star pattern, signifying holiness, is usually made with cross-stitch embroidery. Two sun patterns, considered a sign of the aristocracy, are normally embroidered on the breast area of the nobles’ dresses. The snake, human head, and human figure patterns are usually made with patch embroidery.

=== Headhunting ===
According to a Rukai informant in Wutai, Pingtung, the Rukai themselves did not practise headhunting, meaning they would specifically hunt their enemies' heads. Rather, when an enemy intruded into their living space, they would cut off their enemy's head, and then return to their village, carrying the head with them. This was the law of the land. However, they would not enter the village with the head, but rather take it to a special, nearby place where they would perform a solemn prayer. The head belonged to their enemy, but human life was special and needed to be respected. Though, the act of taking a head in defense of your tribe meant you were brave. The idea the Rukai intentionally attacked their enemies to take their heads, and hence that they were headhunters, is an issue the informant felt needs to be addressed.

== Sovereignty issues ==
The government relocated several Rukai villages following the damage to southern Taiwan from Typhoon Morakot. This mandated move threatened Rukai culture and prompted Rukai groups to begin community-based conservation programs to help local Rukai communities assert sovereignty over traditional lands.

== Notable Rukai people ==
- Rachel Liang, singer
- Saidhai Tahovecahe, member of the Legislative Yuan

== See also ==
- Demographics of Taiwan
- Taiwanese indigenous peoples

== Sources ==
- Saalih, Lee (1998). Culture of Clothing among Taiwan Aborigines. Taiwan: SMC Publishing.
