= 2024 in Taiwan =

- Decades: 2000s; 2010s; 2020s
- See also: Other events of 2024; History of Taiwan • Timeline • Years

Events from the year 2024 in Taiwan, Republic of China. This year is numbered Minguo 113 according to the official Republic of China calendar.

== Incumbents ==
- President: Tsai Ing-wen (until 20 May); Lai Ching-te (since 20 May)
- Vice President: Lai Ching-te (until 20 May); Hsiao Bi-khim (since 20 May)
- Premier: Chen Chien-jen (until 20 May); Cho Jung-tai (since 20 May)
- Vice Premier: Cheng Wen-tsan (until 20 May); Cheng Li-chun (since 20 May)

== Events ==
=== January ===
- January 13:
  - The opposition Kuomintang wins a plurality of seats in the 2024 Taiwanese legislative election.
  - Vice President Lai Ching-te of the ruling Democratic Progressive Party is elected president.
- January 25 – Taiwan officially extends compulsory military service to one year from four months due to rising tensions with China.

=== February ===
- February 14 – 2024 Kinmen Chinese motorboat capsizing incident: Four Chinese fishermen go overboard and two drown near Kinmen, after their boat capsizes while being chased by the Taiwan Coast Guard, who allege they were trespassing.

=== March ===
- March 27 - Polam Kopitam poisoning incident: A food poisoning outbreak originating from Po Lin Teahouse in Xinyi District, Taipei, occurs, believed to be caused by bongkrek acid. Two people die and several others are hospitalized.

=== April ===
- April 3 –
  - 2024 Hualien earthquake: A magnitude 7.4 earthquake is felt off the east coast of Taiwan in Hualien County. Eighteen people are killed, while over 1,100 others are injured.
  - The National Defense Ministry of Taiwan says more than 30 Chinese PLA Air Force warplanes flew near the Taiwanese airspace, and at least nine PLA Navy warships were detected around Taiwan. The ROC Armed Forces is deployed in response.
- April 13 – The Kuomintang wins five of six by-elections for the mayorship of Miaoli City and other local positions, with an independent candidate winning the sixth.

=== May ===
- May 19 – White Terror Memorial Day, an event to commemorate political repression under the regime of Chiang Kai-shek from 1949 to 1987, is officially observed for the first time following a decision by the Taiwanese government.
- May 17 – Highly controversial legislative reform bills are read in the Legislative Yuan, where some lawmakers engage in legislative violence. Chung Chia-pin, Chiu Chih-wei, Chuang Jui-hsiung, Puma Shen and Wu Tsung-hsien go to the hospital for treatment following the incident.
- May 20 – Lai Ching-te is sworn in as President of Taiwan, with Hsiao Bi-khim as his Vice President.
- May 21 – Three people are injured in the 2024 Taichung Metro attack. A suspect is arrested and subsequently sentenced on 26 December to ten years' imprisonment.
- May 23 – China holds military drills around Taiwan as a "strong punishment" for "separatist acts".
- May 24 – Tens of thousands of people protest against reforms in the Legislative Yuan.
- May 28 – The Kuomintang and the Taiwan People's Party pass amendments granting the Legislative Yuan greater powers to monitor the executive and to question officials and citizens. The Democratic Progressive Party said that the opposition wanted to use these amendments to undermine Lai Ching-te's administration.

=== June ===
- June 9 – A Chinese speedboat enters the mouth of the Tamsui River before colliding with other vessels at a ferry terminal. The boat's sole occupant, who claims to be a defector from China, is arrested and later identified as a former captain in the People's Liberation Army Navy of China.
- June 21 – China officially defines Taiwanese separatist behavior as a criminal act.
- June 27 – The government officially advises its citizens to avoid traveling to the People's Republic of China as well as Hong Kong and Macao in response to Beijing's decision to criminalise pro-independence sentiments.

=== July ===
- July 2 – The Taiwanese fishing vessel Tachinman 88 is intercepted and boarded by the China Coast Guard off Kinmen and taken along with its crew to Fujian Province in mainland China.
- July 11 – Taiwan reports that 66 Chinese military aircraft operated around Taiwanese airspace in a 24-hour period, marking the highest single-day number in 2024 so far.
- July 12 – The Ministry of Culture announces the removal of military honor guards from the Chiang Kai-shek Memorial Hall as part of efforts to stop the promotion of a "cult of personality" around the former leader and "authoritarianism".
- July 24–25 – At least ten people are killed nationwide as Typhoon Gaemi makes landfall over Yilan County.
- July 30 – An agreement is reached between China and Taiwan to repatriate the fatalities of the 2024 Kinmen Chinese motorboat capsizing incident to the mainland.
- July 31 – The closure of TransWorld University.

=== August ===
- August 16 – A kindergarten teacher is sentenced to 28 years' imprisonment by the Taipei District Court for 200 cases of sexual abuse involving children dating as early as 2022.
- August 19 – Health officials in Tainan report three cases of mpox since the start of the year.
- August 22 – A court in Taipei sentences eight military officers to up to 13 years' imprisonment for spying for China.
- August 26 – Chinese rapper Wang Yitai is barred from entering Taiwan and has his 14 September concert in Taipei banned for using the term "Taipei, China" in his promotional materials.
- August 30 – Ko Wen-je, the leader of the Taiwan People's Party, is arrested as part of a corruption investigation into a property project conducted when he was mayor of Taipei.

=== September ===
- September 10 – A Mirage 2000 fighter jet of the Republic of China Air Force crashes off the coast of Hsinchu during a nighttime training exercise. The pilot safely ejects and is later rescued.
- September 20 – The Constitutional Court imposes tighter regulations on the usage of the death penalty following a case brought by 37 death row inmates, including a ban on its application to "defendants with mental conditions".

=== October ===
- October 3 –
  - At least two people are killed nationwide as Typhoon Krathon makes landfall over Siaogang District, Kaohsiung.
  - At least nine people are killed in a fire at a hospital in Donggang, Pingtung.
- October 18 – The Department of International Relations and Cooperation of South Africa orders the transfer of the Taiwan Liaison Office in Pretoria to Johannesburg, which Taiwan rejects, calling a violation of a 1997 agreement made following the downgrading of their relations.
- October 25 – The Constitutional Court strikes down amendments passed in May by the Kuomintang and Taiwan People's Party granting the Legislative Yuan expanded oversight powers as unconstitutional, citing the separations of powers among branches of government.
- October 31 – At least two people are killed nationwide as Typhoon Kong-rey makes landfall over Chenggong, Taitung.

=== November ===
- November 15 – The Control Yuan impeaches Feng Kwang-chung, the head of the Taipei Economic and Cultural Office in São Paulo, following investigations into procurement violations and neglect of duties that contributed the suicide of an agency employee in 2023.

=== December ===
- December 19 – Nine people are killed in a fire at an under-construction food-processing building in Taichung.
- December 20 – A brawl breaks out in the Legislative Yuan after KMT lawmakers try to regain control over the Speaker's chair, which had been occupied overnight by DPP lawmakers trying to prevent the passage of legislative reform bills.
- December 25 – The Fair Trade Commission blocks Uber Eats' proposed acquisition of rival service Foodpanda in Taiwan, citing concerns against a monopoly.

== Deaths ==
- 1 January – Chang Chih-chia, 43, baseball pitcher (Seibu Lions, La New Bears).
- 4 January
  - Ssu-ma Chung-yuan, 90, writer.
  - Chen Den-li (陳登立), 89, sportswear company founder (Victor).
- 6 January – Cheng Chung-chuan, 93, artist.
- 15 January – Shih Ming-teh, 83, activist and politician, MLY (1993–2002).
- 1 February – Chang Chuan-chiung, 95, pharmacologist, member of the Academia Sinica.
- 11 February – Chen Chun-han, 40, lawyer, complications of the common cold.
- 15 February – Law Pak, 90, Hong Kong-Taiwanese football player and coach.
- 16 February – Hu Yao-heng (胡耀恆), 88, theatre historian.
- 11 March – Chien Tung-ming, 72, politician, MLY (2008–2020).
- 20 March – Wang Shih-hsiung, 63, politician, MLY (1990–1996), pancreatic cancer.
- 28 March – Chi Pang-yuan, 100, translator.
- 27 June – Chang Yuan-chih, 35, mountaineer, fall.
- 28 July – Shi Jin-Hua, 60, artist, traffic collision.
- 6 August
  - Doris Brougham, 98, American–Taiwanese missionary and English-language educator, multiple organ dysfunction syndrome.
  - Tseng Kuei-hai, 78, physician and poet.
- 4 September – Yang Jen-fu, 82, politician, member of the Legislative Yuan (1999–2012).
- 8 September – Wu Chien-pao, politician, member (1998–2011) and speaker (2002–2010) of the Tainan City Council, esophageal cancer.
- 27 September – Yen Shih-hung, 96, writer and physician.
- 11 October – Ya Hsien, 92, poet.
- 25 October – Wang Ching-feng, 91, politician, Hualien County magistrate (1993–2001).
- 1 November – Chen Huei-dung (陳輝東), 86, artist and museum founder (Tainan Art Museum).
- 19 November – Chang Si-liang, 83, police officer, director-general of the National Police Agency (2003–2004).
- 26 November
  - Peng Tien-fu, 73, politician, member of the Legislative Yuan (2002–2008), member (1990–1998) and speaker (2000–2001) of the Taiwan Provincial Consultative Council.
  - C. S. Song, 95, theologian.
- 29 November – Tony Jian, 69, politician, member of the Legislative Yuan (2002–2005, 2010–2011), esophageal cancer.
- 2 December – Liu Chia-chang, singer-songwriter, screenwriter, director and actor.
- 4 December – Chiung Yao, 86, novelist, suicide.
- 12 December – Lee Tien-yu, 79, air force general and politician, Minister of National Defense (2007–2008), complications of pneumonia.
- 30 December – Lin Kuei-you, 64, political cartoonist, lung cancer.
