= Hsieh Lung-chieh =

Taiwanese politician (born 1961)

- 謝龍介
- Official portrait, 2024

Member of the Legislative Yuan
- Incumbent
- Assumed office 1 February 2024
- Constituency: Party-list (KMT)

Member of the Tainan City Council
- In office 1 March 2002 – 25 December 2022
- Constituency: North District (2002–2018); North and West Central Districts (2018–2022)

Personal details
- Born: 3 October 1961 (age 65) Tainan, Taiwan
- Party: Kuomintang
- Education: Far East University (BA); National Cheng Kung University (MBA)

Military service
- Branch/service: Republic of China Marine Corps
- Years of service: 1981–1984

Hsieh Lung-chieh (Chinese: 謝龍介; pinyin: Xiè Lóngjiè; Pe̍h-ōe-jī: Chiā Liông-kài; born 3 October 1961) is a Taiwanese politician. A member of the Kuomintang (KMT), he has served as a member of the Legislative Yuan since 2024. He was previously a member of the Tainan City Council from 2002 to 2022. He is currently the KMT's candidate for Mayor of Tainan in the local elections scheduled for 28 November 2026. He is known for conducting his public appearances in Taiwanese Hokkien.

== Early life and education ==
Hsieh was born in Tainan, Taiwan, on 3 October 1961. His parents were benshengren, and his ancestors had migrated to Taiwan from Fujian about 300 years earlier. He was raised near the Tainan Confucian Temple.

Hsieh attended Liren Kindergarten (立人幼稚園), Liren Elementary School (立人國小), and Minde Junior High School (民德國中) in Tainan. He then was a student at National Tainan Second Senior High School from 1977 to 1980, where he served as a company leader in the school's Scouts of China troop. He ultimately transferred to Chang Jung Senior High School in East District, Tainan, where he graduated in 1981.

After high school, Hsieh served three years in the Republic of China Marine Corps. He later graduated from Far East University with a bachelor's degree in business administration. In 2012, he earned a Master of Business Administration (M.B.A.) degree from National Cheng Kung University. His master's thesis was titled, A Study of Trait Emotional Intelligence Impact on Job Burnout in Representative Assistants—Verify Mediating Effect of Emotional Labor (民代助理特質情緒智力對工作倦怠影響之研究–情緒勞動中介效果之驗證).

== Tainan City Council (2010–2022) ==
Hsieh served as a village chief before becoming a city councilor. His fluent Taiwanese Hokkien and liberal use of colloquial sayings made him a regular guest on political talk shows. He ran against Chen Ting-fei of the Democratic Progressive Party (DPP) in the 1998 Tainan City Council election, in which Chen defeated him.

In 2010, Hsieh won a seat on the Tainan City Council with the second-highest vote total. But on 22 May 2014, he resigned after using a council session to demand that Tainan mayor Lai Ching-te step down. Lai had vouched for the integrity of former DPP secretary-general Wu Nai-ren and former legislator Hung Chi-chang after the two were convicted in a Taiwan Sugar Corporation land case, and had called for a retrial. Hsieh proposed that Lai resign if both men were found guilty and that he himself would resign if both were cleared. The retrial acquitted Hung and reduced Wu's sentence while still finding him guilty, after which Hsieh insisted that Lai resign and, when Lai refused, gave up his own seat. Hsieh was the first councilor to resign voluntarily since the merger of Tainan City and Tainan County. Hsieh, who chaired the KMT's Tainan chapter at the time, then stood outside the council building each day to demand that Lai also resign. He was re-elected to the council later in 2014.

Hsieh in 2019

On 6 January 2015, Lai announced that he would not attend council meetings until the courts had resolved vote-buying allegations against KMT council speaker Lee Chuan-chiao. In response, Hsieh filed a complaint with the Tainan District Prosecutors' Office accusing Lai and 20 city officials of dereliction of duty, obstructing official business, and violating the Local Government Act. In February 2015, he proposed a motion to refer Lai and the city officials absent from a council meeting to the Control Yuan for impeachment.

In December 2015, Hsieh became a viral internet celebrity for fluently reciting Taiwanese Hokkien idioms during council question-and-answer sessions.

In September 2017, Hsieh announced that he would run for chair of the KMT's Tainan chapter. He won the chapter chairmanship on 15 October 2017. During an April 2018 council interpellation, Hsieh asked city department heads which of them would fight for Taiwan in a cross-strait war and, after nearly all raised their hands, called them fools for doing so, a remark that drew online criticism when the video circulated during his 2019 by-election campaign. In the 2018 local elections, Hsieh was re-elected to the Tainan City Council with 23,893 votes, the most received by any council candidate in Tainan.

Hsieh was the KMT's candidate in one of the legislative by-elections held on 16 March 2019, losing to the DPP's Kuo Kuo-wen. In November 2019, Hsieh, who had been recommended by KMT presidential nominee Han Kuo-yu, was moved from 11th to 15th place on the party's list for the 2020 Taiwanese legislative election, directly behind party chairman Wu Den-yih. He did not win a seat in 2020. On 17 March 2020, KMT chairman Johnny Chiang named Hsieh one of the party's deputy secretaries-general.

== Legislative Yuan (2024–present) ==
Hsieh in April 2025, protesting against the 2025 Taiwanese mass electoral recall campaigns

In November 2023, the KMT placed Hsieh on its party list for the 2024 Taiwanese legislative election. He was ranked tenth on the list and won a seat. He took office on 1 February 2024. That day, he arrived at the legislature carrying an umbrella printed with a mock film poster whose title pledged lifelong supervision of president-elect Lai Ching-te. He told reporters he had been using the umbrella since Lai's time as premier. Hsieh sat on the Judiciary and Organic Laws and Statutes Committee during his first two sessions and on the Education and Culture Committee in the three sessions that followed.

== Tainan mayoral campaigns ==
=== 2022 Tainan mayoral campaign ===
Hsieh, then a city councilor, declared his candidacy for Tainan mayor in February 2022. The KMT announced him as its candidate on 23 March 2022. His campaign against DPP incumbent Huang Wei-che centered on crime and public safety, and he also promised free diapers and stipends for new parents in response to the city's falling birth rate. Because Tainan, governed by the DPP since 1997, was a longtime pan-Green stronghold, most analysts regarded a KMT victory in Tainan as highly unlikely. Hsieh lost the election, receiving 43.63 percent of the vote compared to Huang's 48.80 percent. It was a closer result than forecast; Huang had been expected to receive a double-digit margin.

=== 2026 Tainan mayoral campaign ===
In October 2025, former legislator Chen I-hsin announced a bid for the KMT's Tainan mayoral nomination and urged the party to hold a primary, and Hsieh competed against him. By the end of that month, Hsieh had pledged to serve only one four-year term if elected. The KMT's Central Standing Committee nominated Hsieh over Chen on 24 December 2025.
