= Kuo Kuo-wen =

Taiwanese political scientist and politician (born 1967)

Kuo Kuo-wen MLY
- 郭國文
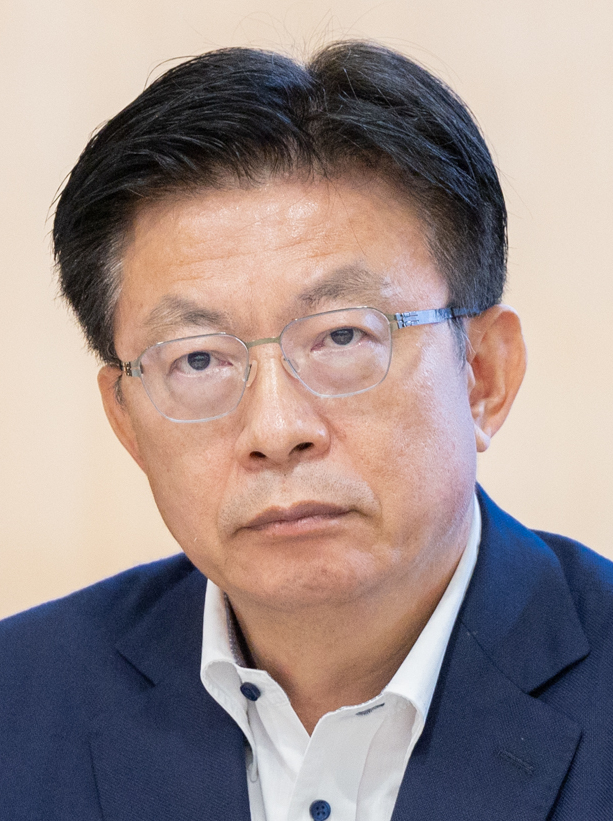
- Kuo in 2024

Member of the Legislative Yuan
- Incumbent
- Assumed office 21 March 2019
- Preceded by: Huang Wei-che
- Constituency: Tainan 2

Deputy Minister of Labor
- In office 20 May 2016 – 7 September 2017
- Minister: See list: Kuo Fang-yu Lin Mei-chu
- Preceded by: Hau Fong-ming
- Succeeded by: Shih Keh-her

Tainan City Councillor
- In office 25 December 2010 – 19 May 2016
- Constituency: Tainan IX

Personal details
- Born: 11 March 1967 (age 59) Guanmiao, Tainan County, Taiwan
- Education: Aletheia University (BBA); National Taiwan University (MA); National Cheng Kung University (PhD)

Kuo Kuo-wen (Chinese: 郭國文; pinyin: Guō Guówén; born 11 March 1967), also known by the English name Robert Kuo, is a Taiwanese political scientist and politician. He has served as a member of the Legislative Yuan since 2019. From 2016 to 2017, he was a deputy minister of labor. Previously, he was the secretary-general to the Taiwan Confederation of Trade Unions and a member of the Tainan City Council.

== Early life and education ==
Kuo Kuo-wen was born in Guanmiao District, Tainan, on 11 March 1967. After graduating from Aletheia University with a Bachelor of Business Administration (B.B.A.), he earned a master's degree in national development from National Taiwan University and, in 2015, his Ph.D. in political science from National Cheng Kung University. His doctoral dissertation was titled, "Intergovernmental Relations and Local Finance under Institutional Change: A Case Study of Tainan City Government" (制度變遷下的府際關係與地方財政—以台南市政府為例).

== Activism ==
Kuo is involved with the labor movement in Taiwan, and was the secretary-general of the Taiwan Labor Front and the Taiwan Confederation of Trade Unions.

== Political career ==
In May 2016, he was appointed the deputy minister of labor, and vacated his seat on the Tainan City Council to take the post. In September 2017, he left his position at the labor ministry, citing personal reasons. Considered a potential candidate for the 2020 legislative election, Kuo instead contested a March 2019 legislative by-election in Tainan for the open seat of Huang Wei-cher, and defeated four other candidates. Kuo won the election, though he finished less than three percent ahead of his closest challenger, Kuomintang candidate Hsieh Lung-chieh, in a district that has been considered a stronghold for the Democratic Progressive Party. Kuo was sworn in as a member of the Legislative Yuan on 21 March 2019. He won a full legislative term in 2020, facing Kuomintang candidate Lee Wu-lung.

During the legislative reform controversy on 17 May 2024, he snatched documents from Chester Chou, the secretary-general of the Legislative Yuan, and fled in an attempt to prevent the majority opposition coalition from passing the bill.
