= Taiyen Green Energy corruption case =

2024 Taiwanese scandal

Taiyen Green Energy Solar Power Scandal
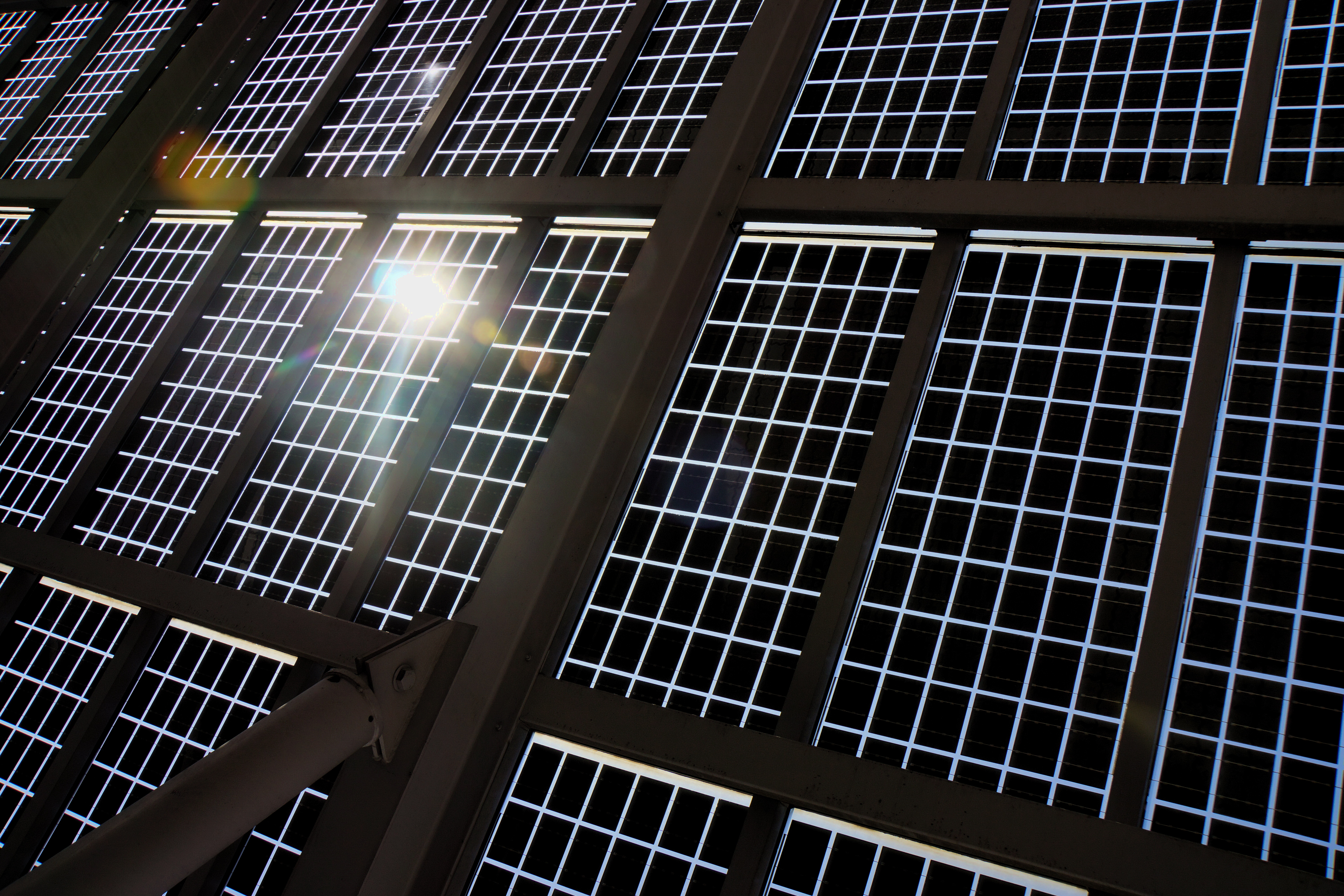
- Type: Corruption
- Motive: Allegedly obtaining assets from Taiyen Green Energy and benefiting four private shareholders through compensation payments.
- Outcome: The Tainan District Prosecutors Office detained the main suspects, including former Taiyen chairman Chen Chi-yu, former Taiyen Green Energy general manager Su Kun-huang, former deputy general manager Kuo Cheng-wei, Honghui International head Su Chun-jen, and Chaoyang Development head Tai Yu-chien.

The Taiyen Green Energy Solar Power Scandal was a political corruption scandal in 2024 in Taiwan involving former Taiyen Biotech Co., Ltd chairman Chen Chi-yu, former Taiyen Green Energy general manager Su Kun-huang, former deputy general manager Kuo Cheng-wei, Su Chun-jen, head of Honghui International, and Tai Yu-chien, head of Chaoyang Development. The case has been described as a systemic corruption scheme and one of several solar energy scandals that occurred during the administration of President Tsai Ing-wen.

== Development of the case ==
Taiyen Green Energy, a subsidiary of Taiyen Company, was established to develop green energy, solar photovoltaic power, and fishery-solar symbiosis projects. Chen Chi-yu, then chairman of the company, was accused of profiting from solar power land lease agreements signed in Tainan and Chiayi and subsequently awarding engineering projects to four privately owned companies. He allegedly benefited those companies through breach-of-contract compensation arrangements and inflated expenses related to solar projects. Since Chen's son had worked for Honghui Technology, one of the four companies, observers questioned whether Chen had improperly favored the contractor.

== Judicial investigation ==
On 22 October 2024, the Tainan District Prosecutors Office conducted searches at 32 locations associated with Taiyen Green Energy and brought in 34 individuals for questioning. The following day, prosecutors sought detention of former chairman Chen Chi-yu and four others on suspicion of aggravated breach of trust under the Securities and Exchange Act (Taiwan) and causing public officials to make false entries under the Criminal Code of the Republic of China. After a detention hearing, the Tainan District Court ruled at around 4 a.m. on 24 October that the evidence was insufficient and rejected the requests for detention without communication and restrictions on correspondence.

On 25 October, the Tainan District Prosecutors Office appealed. The Taiwan High Court Tainan Branch Court held that the lower court should not have concluded that Taiyen Green Energy was exempt from the Securities and Exchange Act merely because it was not a publicly listed company, as its conduct might still satisfy the statutory elements of an offense under the Act. On 28 October, the case was remanded to the Tainan District Court for a new trial.

On 1 November 2024, the Tainan District Court held a second detention hearing. Former Taiyen Green Energy general manager Su Kun-huang and Honghui International head Su Chun-jen were detained, while Kuo Cheng-wei and Tai Yu-chien were released without bail due to insufficient evidence. Prosecutors filed another appeal. Chen Chi-yu failed to appear without explanation, and attempts to compel his appearance were unsuccessful. On 4 November, the Tainan District Prosecutors Office issued a wanted notice for Chen.

On 5 November 2024, the Tainan branch of the Taiwan High Court overturned the lower court's ruling and again remanded the case. A third detention hearing was held on 6 November, after which Kuo Cheng-wei and Tai Yu-chien were ordered detained and prohibited from receiving visitors. On 25 November 2024, Chen Chi-yu surrendered to the Tainan District Prosecutors Office accompanied by his attorney. Prosecutors arrested him immediately after questioning and requested detention without communication, which the court approved later that evening.

On 13 January 2025, the Tainan District Court ordered that Chen's detention be extended for another two months beginning on 25 January 2025 and continued to prohibit visits and correspondence.

On 28 February 2025, prosecutors alleged that the Su Chun-jen group had sought to profit from land development associated with solar power projects. After Chen Chi-yu became chairman of Taiyen on 13 June 2016, the group allegedly sought to exploit his position to develop green energy sites. Prosecutors stated that Chen, burdened by debt, agreed to an arrangement that ostensibly involved joint cooperation but was in fact designed to distribute illicit benefits. Despite objections from state-appointed and independent directors, he allegedly directed Taiyen to establish Taiyen Green Energy and prevented it from signing contracts with power companies in order to benefit certain interests. Prosecutors determined that Chen had obtained illegal gains totaling NT$58,000,425, while Su Kun-huang had received NT$74,611,341. Prosecutors sought a sentence of 12 years for Chen and 10 years for Su, requested appropriate prison terms for the remaining defendants, and asked that the detention and communication restrictions on Chen, Su Kun-huang, and Su Chun-jen be extended.

On 16 April 2025, during a preparatory hearing, Chen reversed his earlier position and denied any criminal intent. He stated that he had once proposed that Honghui International should share 40 percent of its net profits with him if the company became profitable, but claimed that Su Chun-jen had never agreed. Chen further asserted that the NT$49.1 million transferred by Honghui International had been borrowed from Su after he had guaranteed a friend's debt and suffered financial losses, and that he borrowed the money to preserve his position as chairman of Taiyen.

== Positions of major political parties ==
=== Democratic Progressive Party ===
On 13 November 2024, President and Democratic Progressive Party chairman Lai Ching-te stated that although Chen Chi-yu had already withdrawn from the party, he should report to authorities as soon as possible and reiterated support for judicial authorities in apprehending him.

=== Kuomintang ===
On 23 October 2024, Kuomintang legislator-at-large Hsieh Lung-chieh stated that several politicians associated with the Democratic Progressive Party and involved in scandals were at risk of fleeing and urged the Ministry of Justice to take preventive measures.

On 2 November 2024, Kuomintang caucus deputy secretary-general Wang Hung-wei criticized the Tainan District Prosecutors Office for relying on the Securities and Exchange Act in seeking detention, arguing that the legal basis had not been accepted by the court. She further questioned why no measures had been taken to prevent Chen Chi-yu from fleeing and accused prosecutors of merely putting on a show without genuinely intending to arrest him.

=== Taiwan People's Party ===
On 22 October 2024, Taiwan People's Party legislator-at-large Huang Kuo-chang wrote on Facebook that the flow of illicit funds in the case should be thoroughly investigated and demanded that the judiciary apply equal standards to all political camps. On 1 November, he again criticized corruption involving green energy projects under the Democratic Progressive Party and questioned the appointment of Wu Kuo-ching as chairman, arguing that former Minister of Economic Affairs Wang Mei-hua's endorsement of Wu lacked credibility.

On 11 November, eight days after Chen Chi-yu went into hiding, Huang stated that corruption at Taiyen Green Energy had caused the company to lose more than NT$400 million in just two years and once again questioned the integrity of the Democratic Progressive Party's governance.
