= Chen Yixin (disambiguation) =

Chen Yixin (陈一新; born 1959) is a Chinese politician.

It may also refer to:

- Chen Yixin (actress) (陈一心; born 2000), Singaporean actress
- Yixin Chen (陳一昕; born 1979), Chinese born American computer scientist, academic, and author
- Chen I-hsin (陳以信; born 1972), Taiwanese politician
