= 2023 Taipei child abuse case =

Kaikai
- Born: 21 February 2022; New Taipei City, Taiwan
- Died: 24 December 2023 (aged 1); No. 16, Lane 41, Shanyan Road, Wenshan District, Taipei, Taiwan
- Cause of death: Rhabdomyolysis
- Body discovered: Wenshan District, Taipei
- Resting place: Yangming Mountain First Public Cemetery, Taipei City (Yangming Ling’ai Building, Area E1)
- Other name: Kaikai

Taipei nanny abuse death case
- Location: Taipei City
- Date: December 24, 2023 (UTC+8)
- Target: Male child "Kaikai"
- Attack type: Child abuse resulting in death
- Assailant: Liu Cai-xuan (formerly Shen Su-fen) Liu Ruo-lin (formerly Shen Su-fang)
- Accused: Liu Cai-xuan (formerly Shen Su-fen) Liu Ruo-lin (formerly Shen Su-fang) Chen Shang-jie
- Convictions: On May 13, 2025, the Taipei District Court of first instance sentenced Liu Cai-xuan to life imprisonment and Liu Ruo-lin to 18 years of fixed-term imprisonment under the Criminal Code of the Republic of China and the Child and Youth Welfare and Rights Protection Act for offenses including intentional injury to a child resulting in death and abuse causing death. On January 27, 2026, the second-instance court upheld the original judgment.

A one-and-a-half-year-old boy surnamed Liu in Taipei City, Taiwan (pseudonym "Kaikai"), died after being sent to hospital in critical condition on December 24, 2023, due to prolonged child abuse by transitional foster caregiver Liu Cai-xuan during the waiting period for adoption placement. The case was exposed by funeral industry workers after the 2024 Taiwanese general election, drawing widespread public attention and condemnation in Taiwanese society, and leading to a comprehensive review of child welfare institutions, the social worker system, and foster care supervision mechanisms.

== Background ==
The deceased boy was born on February 21, 2022, in New Taipei City, Republic of China (Taiwan). His biological father was missing, and his biological mother was incarcerated due to criminal offenses. Before her imprisonment, the mother had entrusted a private nanny with his care. However, as the nanny lacked formal adoption qualifications and the boy's grandmother was unable to afford the cost of care, the New Taipei City Department of Social Welfare intervened and commissioned the Child Welfare League Foundation to arrange foster care placement. From September 2023 onward, sisters Liu Cai-xuan (formerly Shen Su-fen) and Liu Ruo-lin (formerly Shen Su-fang), residing in Taipei City, became the primary caregivers, with social worker Chen Shang-jie from the Child Welfare League Foundation responsible for regular visits.

== Incident ==
On December 24, 2023, Kaikai was sent to the hospital due to respiratory distress and died despite first aid. Social worker Chen Shang-jie and caregiver Liu Cai-xuan told doctors that Kaikai had choked on milk; however, a prosecutorial autopsy revealed multiple bruises and fractures, broken teeth, fingernails that had been forcibly removed, burn on the male reproductive system, and signs of malnutrition. Medical reports indicated that the injuries were clearly inconsistent with normal childcare conditions, and the cause of death was determined by prosecutors and police to be "rhabdomyolysis." Police immediately initiated an investigation and notified the social worker and the social welfare department.

Through the reconstruction of abusive conversations and photographs found on the Liu sisters' mobile phones, as well as video recordings and testimony provided by a foreign domestic caregiver in the household, investigators found that Kaikai, who was just over one year old, had been subjected to punishments such as forced standing without clothing, being fed kitchen waste, being bathed in cold water during winter, having his body forcibly folded and stuffed into a bucket, having his teeth broken, and suffering multiple fractures throughout his body. During the 114 days he stayed at Liu Cai-xuan's home, Kaikai was abused to the point of severe bodily injury and ultimately died before receiving medical treatment. The actions of the Liu sisters aroused widespread public outrage and sparked extensive discussion on child protection systems.

== Judicial proceedings ==
=== Liu Cai-xuan and her sister ===
==== Indictment ====
In January 2024, caregiver Liu Cai-xuan and her younger sister were detained by prosecutors. Both denied abuse, claiming that Kaikai’s injuries resulted from falls and self-inflicted impacts.

In April 2024, the Taipei District Prosecutors Office indicted Liu Cai-xuan and Liu Ruo-lin on the following charges:

- Article 286, Paragraphs 1 and 3 of the Criminal Code of the Republic of China: Abuse of a child resulting in death.
- Article 112, Paragraph 1 of the Child and Youth Welfare and Rights Protection Act, in conjunction with Article 302-1, Paragraph 1, Subparagraph 4 and Paragraph 2 of the Criminal Code of the Republic of China: Intentional abuse of a child by an adult resulting in unlawful restraint and death.
- Article 112, Paragraph 1 of the Child and Youth Welfare and Rights Protection Act, in conjunction with Article 277, Paragraph 2 of the Criminal Code: Intentional injury to a child resulting in death.

==== Preparatory proceedings ====
On September 25, 2024, during the first hearing, the Liu sisters denied all charges and retracted previous statements in court, alleging that prosecutors had used improper methods during interrogation and asserting that earlier records did not reflect their true intent.

On December 25, 2024, during the second hearing, prosecutors submitted additional evidence, but the Liu sisters continued to deny all allegations.

On February 5, 2025, during the third hearing, prosecutors initially planned to submit 109 photographs as evidence of abuse; however, considering the burden on lay judges, the court reduced the number to 67. Prosecutors expressed concern that the evidence might not fully reflect the scope of the crimes. The Liu sisters admitted only to binding and striking the soles of the feet, denying all other allegations.

On March 19, 2025, during the fourth hearing, hundreds of supporters gathered outside the Taipei District Court, including Taipei 101 Chairperson Chia Yung-chieh, holding signs calling for severe sentencing and denial of parole for the two defendants.

==== Trial proceedings ====
After more than a year of indictment and preparatory procedures, the trial formally began on April 22, 2025. The case was heard by three professional judges and six lay judges (two men and four women). The trial duration set a record for the longest since the implementation of the lay judge system in July 2023, with a total of 10 hearing days (plus three reserved preparatory days). The court ruled that Kaikai would be referred to as "Child A" in court. Prosecutors presented key evidence, including repeated binding of Child A with cloths and straps, leaving his body resembling a mummy, covering his head with fruit netting, and communication records between the sisters. In these messages, Liu Cai-xuan stated that "he behaves obediently once tied up," while Liu Ruo-lin responded with phrases such as "he has no chance," "he cried hard and overturned again, the bucket flipped," and "playing dead." The brutality of the evidence and the cold tone of the messages caused the grandmother present in court to break down emotionally, and the courtroom atmosphere was heavy.

On April 23, 2025 (second day of trial), key witness Mira, a former foreign caregiver employed by the Liu family, returned from abroad to testify. She provided multiple eyewitness accounts, including prolonged punishment by forced standing, bathing naked in cold water, being fed leftover food (even containing cockroaches) in the bathroom, and repeated bruising and abnormal reactions. Mira stated that some details were not personally witnessed but were supported by video and audio recordings, which prosecutors regarded as critical evidence. The defense questioned the scope of her observations and language ability.

On April 23, 2025 (third day of trial), two former caregivers and Liu Cai-xuan's son Wang Kai-hong testified. One caregiver testified that Kaikai had been healthy and lively with no abnormalities, and that the handover to Liu Cai-xuan had been rushed with insufficient explanation. Another caregiver stated that although there had been muscle tension and crying, overall care was manageable. Wang Kai-hong claimed that Kaikai had used profanity, engaged in self-harm, and exhibited abnormal excretion, and stated that he had suggested reporting to a social worker. However, the court and prosecutors questioned the limited duration of his contact and possible fabrication, as well as his involvement in a prior perjury case, challenging the credibility of his testimony.

On April 28, 2025 (fourth day of trial), Liu Cai-xuan admitted to binding Kaikai but claimed that statements such as "want to slap him to death" were casual remarks. When shown photos of Kaikai's swollen mouth, she claimed it was due to a crab allergy. Liu Ruo-lin initially denied witnessing punishment but changed her statement after being confronted with evidence, claiming the injuries were caused by falls and expressing no objection to the binding behavior.

On April 29, 2025 (fifth day of trial), forensic expert Hsu Cho-hsien testified that Kaikai, only about one year old, had suffered long-term malnutrition leading to immunodeficiency, pneumonia, and eventual death from hypovolemic shock. Extensive bruising was found across his body, comparable to being struck with a baseball bat. In the afternoon, pediatrician Lü Li from National Taiwan University described the injuries—over 42 distinct wounds across the head, limbs, and body, including genital avulsion—as "textbook-level abuse," and suspected sexual abuse. He refuted claims that teeth had fallen out due to bruxism, noting no signs of wear. He also stated that Kaikai's body temperature was only 24°C upon arrival at the hospital, indicating prolonged neglect and extreme suffering before death.

On April 30, 2025 (sixth day of trial), psychiatrist Chiu Yen-nan testified that Kaikai had developed depression, post-traumatic stress disorder, adjustment disorder, and attachment disorder under Liu Cai-xuan's care, consistent with prolonged and multiple forms of abuse. He emphasized the transformation from a lively child to one with vacant, fearful eyes and slowed behavior, indicating severe psychological damage. He rejected claims of self-harm or emotional issues, attributing them to long-term trauma rather than separation anxiety.

On the afternoon of April 30, Liu Cai-xuan changed her plea and admitted to some charges, including injury, unlawful restraint, and abuse of a child resulting in death. She expressed remorse for binding, corporal punishment, and causing tooth loss with a spoon but denied other allegations and intent to kill. Some legal experts interpreted this plea as strategic, avoiding acknowledgment of intent to kill in order to seek a reduced sentence. Under current law, without proof of intent to kill, even severe abuse may result only in life imprisonment, not the death penalty.

On May 2, 2025 (seventh day of trial), Liu Ruo-lin continued questioning and denied all abuse allegations. She admitted deleting message records after the incident but claimed it was not to conceal wrongdoing. She described her messages as casual suggestions or jokes and portrayed herself as a passive participant, frequently responding with "I don't know" or "I don’t remember." Prosecutors argued that she actively encouraged the abuse and participated in actions such as placing Kaikai into a bucket, making her a co-perpetrator. They emphasized that intervention by either defendant could have prevented the tragedy. The defense for Liu Cai-xuan requested leniency based on her guilty plea and lack of malicious intent, while Liu Ruo-lin's defense argued she did not directly participate and should not be considered a co-offender. The grandmother's lawyer strongly condemned both defendants as co-perpetrators of fatal abuse and urged severe punishment.

On May 5–6, 2025 (eighth and ninth days of trial), sentencing investigations were conducted. The grandmother broke down emotionally in court, refused settlement or civil compensation, and expressed deep self-blame. Psychiatric evaluation found that Liu Cai-xuan did not suffer from mental illness, and her claims of trauma and hallucinations were considered potentially aimed at sentence mitigation. Her lawyer presented a written prayer asking Kaikai for forgiveness and help in avoiding imprisonment, which triggered strong public backlash.

On May 7, 2025, the trial concluded. Prosecutors stated that out of Kaikai's 672 days of life, 115 days were marked by inhumane treatment, describing Liu Cai-xuan as persistently abusive "like a spider," and recommended life imprisonment. For Liu Ruo-lin, prosecutors sought an 18-year sentence, citing moral disengagement and passive complicity. Liu Cai-xuan's defense requested a reduced sentence of 16 to 18 years, citing her guilty plea and remorse. Liu Ruo-lin stated briefly that she had nothing to say; her defense requested a sentence of 10 years and 1 month if convicted of abuse resulting in death, or 1 year and 6 months if convicted only of abuse with unlawful restraint.

== Verdict ==
On May 13, 2025, the Taipei District Court of first instance sentenced Liu Cai-xuan to life imprisonment and Liu Ruo-lin to 18 years of fixed-term imprisonment. The convictions were based on charges under the Criminal Code of the Republic of China for intentional injury by an adult against a child resulting in death, and under the Child and Youth Welfare and Rights Protection Act for intentional unlawful restraint and abuse of a child resulting in death.

On January 27, 2026, a high court rejected the appeal and upheld the first-instance judgment.

=== Social worker Chen Shang-jie (Child Welfare League Foundation) ===
In August 2024, the Taipei District Prosecutors Office stated that social worker Chen Shang-jie failed to conduct visits as required, notified the caregiver in advance, failed to report abnormal conditions or increase visit frequency, and violated both internal regulations of the Child Welfare League Foundation and the Child and Youth Welfare and Rights Protection Act. Chen was also alleged to have discussed with senior supervisors how to respond to the prosecution and to have falsified visit records. She was indicted on charges of negligent homicide and document forgery.

In April 2026, the Taipei District Court ruled in the first instance that Chen Shang-jie bore a "duty of care as a guarantor," had blindly trusted Liu Cai-xuan, and missed the opportunity to rescue Kaikai. During trial, she maintained her innocence and failed to reach a settlement with the family. She was sentenced to two years of imprisonment for negligent homicide without suspension; the charge of document forgery was dismissed due to insufficient evidence.

=== Wenshan Childcare Center visitation staff (surname Lin) ===
A visitation staff member surnamed Lin from the Wenshan Childcare Center was suspected of falsifying visit records. The Taipei District Prosecutors Office accepted the case for investigation in 2025.

== Child Protection March ==
On May 1, 2025, writer Yen Tze-yaposted that while the caregiver’s actions in the Kaikai case were appalling, attention should also be given to the Taipei and New Taipei city governments, which allegedly suppressed news of the case for over two months, and to the Child Welfare League Foundation’s role in the Legislative Yuan. She warned against support activities that did not mention these institutions, describing them as public relations operations.

On May 2, 2025, internet personality "Pa Chiung" posted on the social platform Threads, warning that "the Chinese Communist Party and pro-China groups in Taiwan are using the May 10 Kaikai case march to stir dissatisfaction with the Taiwanese government and promote narratives of unification."

On May 2, 2025, National Cheng Kung University professor Lee Chung-hsien emphasized that "misdirected justice becomes complicity," arguing that accountability should be directed toward specific authorities and institutions. He also criticized some self-media for confusing public understanding, urging the public to distinguish between those responsible and those exploiting the tragedy. He described such actions as manipulating tragedy and emotions to obscure responsibility, shifting the focus from local authorities to the central government, and even extending to cognitive warfare narratives targeting Taiwan. He further called for maintaining distance from the May 10 street protests, emphasizing that what Kaikai needs is justice, not spectacle.

On May 10, 2025, multiple civil groups organized a "Child Protection March" on Ketagalan Boulevard. Thousands of participants dressed in white gathered, holding signs such as "Child abuse is intolerable" and "Zero tolerance for child abuse," demanding that the government address systemic loopholes and strengthen child protection responsibilities. The groups proposed six major demands, including establishing a dedicated child protection ministry, increasing specialized pediatric protection physicians, and imposing harsher penalties without parole for child abuse. A petition campaign collected 84,467 signatures by the end of the event, which were submitted to government bodies including the Presidential Office. Taipei 101 Chairperson Chia Yung-chieh and others attended in support; she stated that justice should be served for Kaikai and that perpetrators should receive proportionate punishment, even suggesting that the death penalty would be humane in their case.

== Response and criticism of the Child Welfare League Foundation ==
The Child Welfare League Foundation stated publicly that all caregivers had passed review procedures and that visit records were complete, denying wrongdoing but acknowledging that the system required review. Chairperson Lin Chih-chia publicly urged social workers to “bravely face society,” which was criticized as shifting responsibility and undermining frontline social workers, triggering internal disputes over governance and accountability.

On March 17, 2024, Executive Director Pai Li-fang resigned at the request of the board of directors.

On March 20, 2025, some public opinion identified the Child Welfare League Foundation as the root of the problem and called for a suspension of donations to the organization.

== Policy and institutional review ==
On March 13, 2024, the Ministry of Health and Welfare announced the suspension of new cases handled by the Child Welfare League Foundation and proposed six major reforms, including strengthening caregiver screening, increasing dedicated pediatric physicians, implementing a three-party joint visitation mechanism, and preventing adoption placements driven by economic factors.

On March 14, 2024, Kuomintang legislator Wang Yu-min (then convener of the Legislative Yuan Social Welfare and Environmental Hygiene Committee), who also served as a board member of the Child Welfare League Foundation, announced her resignation from the board.

On March 15, 2024, the Executive Yuan convened an inter-ministerial review meeting, inviting the governments of New Taipei City and Taipei City, as well as academic experts, to discuss institutional reforms.

On March 18, 2024, the Legislative Yuan Social Welfare and Environmental Hygiene Committee invited the Ministry of Health and Welfare for discussion. As Wang Yu-min, who had ties to the case, was presiding as chair, Democratic Progressive Party legislators demanded her recusal and requested that the Kuomintang appoint another member, leading to conflict between the two parties.

On March 23, 2024, Taipei City Council members from the Democratic Progressive Party and Taiwan People's Party demanded a special report from the city government. However, under the supervision of Kuomintang Taipei Party Chair Huang Lu Chin-ju, Kuomintang councilors boycotted the session, causing it to collapse procedurally and allowing the Taipei City Government under Mayor Chiang Wan-an to avoid reporting and discussion on the case.

In February 2025, a citizen proposal on the Public Policy Online Participation Platform suggested legal amendments to impose harsher penalties: life imprisonment for child abuse resulting in disability, and life imprisonment or the death penalty for child abuse resulting in death, with no parole for any child abuse or sexual abuse cases. By March, the proposal had received over 130,000 endorsements. In May, the Ministry of Justice responded that the proposal violated the principle of proportionality in criminal punishment and stated that it would consider various opinions in future legal revisions.

On July 18, 2025, the Legislative Yuan passed amendments to the Criminal Code, adding Article 272-1, which increases penalties for homicide victims under the age of seven by one-half, and stipulates that those who torture and kill a child under seven may be sentenced to death or life imprisonment. Article 286 was also amended to provide that abuse resulting in the death of a child under seven may be punished by death, life imprisonment, or a term of not less than 10 years.

== Control Yuan investigation ==
In May 2025, Control Yuan members Yeh Ta-hua, Wang Yu-ling, and Chang Ju-fang identified the following issues in the case:

- Lack of professional sensitivity among social workers
- Multiple deficiencies in caregiver management and social worker training by the Child Welfare League Foundation
- Inadequate supervision by the Ministry of Health and Welfare
- Failure of the New Taipei City Government to properly implement record-keeping
- Superficial visitation guidance by the Taipei City Government

Accordingly, corrective measures were proposed against the Ministry of Health and Welfare, the New Taipei City Government, and the Taipei City Government, and the Taipei District Court was advised to consider the misconduct of the foundation’s social workers.

== Related controversies ==
When police brought social worker Chen Shang-jie in for questioning, she was handcuffed with the restraints visible and was subjected to inappropriate media coverage, in violation of the Code of Criminal Procedure and regulations governing the use of restraints during arrest and escort. In March 2025, the Control Yuan issued corrective measures against the National Police Agency of the Ministry of the Interior and the Taipei City Police Department.
