= Wu Chien-pao =

Taiwanese politician (1950–2024)

- 吳健保

Member of the Tainan City Council
- In office 25 December 2010 – 11 May 2011

Speaker of the Tainan County Council
- In office 20 December 2002 – 25 December 2010
- Preceded by: Lee Ho-shun
- Succeeded by: Lai Mei-hui as Speaker of the Tainan City Council

Deputy speaker of the Tainan County Council
- In office 20 December 1998 – 20 December 2002

Member of the Tainan County Council
- In office 20 December 1998 – 25 December 2010

Personal details
- Born: 29 November 1950 Rende, Tainan County, Taiwan
- Died: 8 September 2024 (aged 73)
- Party: Kuomintang (until 2010)
- Occupation: Politician

Wu Chien-pao (Chinese: 吳健保; pinyin: Wú Jiànbǎo; 29 November 1950 – 8 September 2024) was a Taiwanese politician. He was a member of the Tainan County Council from 1998 to 2010, and served as its speaker from 2002 to 2010. Wu served on the succeeding Tainan City Council from December 2010 to May 2011, when he was removed from office as part of a legal verdict against him.

Wu served a two-year prison sentence and fled Taiwan by 2014. He was extradited from the Philippines in 2019, subsequently returned to prison, then granted parole in May 2024.

== Career ==
=== Early political career and support for environmentalism ===
Wu's 1998 campaign for the Tainan County Council was supported by the Kuomintang. Throughout his tenure on the council, Wu maintained an interest in environmental causes affecting Southern Taiwan. In 2001, he backed Tainan County magistrate Mark Chen's decision to support Kueijen Township residents' protest of an Environmental Protection Administration plan to construct an industrial waste complex there. Wu was elected speaker of the county council in 2002. In 2003, Wu organized a demonstration at the Nanhua Reservoir, calling for the government to lift restrictions on development at the site while providing compensation for county residents. Shortly after Typhoon Morakot struck Taiwan in August 2009, Wu criticized the decision to build a water diversion tunnel through Mount Siandu. Completion of the tunnel was suspected to have contributed to a landslide that destroyed the village of Siaolin, Kaohsiung.

=== Alleged gang ties and gambling ===
Wu drew continuous attention for alleged ties to gangs. In March 2004, police alleged that Wu bet on the Taiwan Capitalization Weighted Stock Index, and won NT$50 million. He reportedly promised NT$18 million of the total to Chang Chao-lin of the Four Seas Gang if Chang helped Wu collect his winnings. Wu only received NT$6 million, and supposedly asked other gang members to pursue Chang. In March 2005, the Tainan District Prosecutors' Office sought Wu and Lee Chuan-fu for questioning. The pair were suspected of earning NT$1 billion in profit via Wu's Fu-hsin Company, which had begun dredging sand from the Tsengwen River in 2004. In the midst of the Tsengwen River case, Wu ran for reelection as Tainan County Council speaker and won in March 2006. The Tainan District Court heard charges against Wu, ruling in August 2008 that he was not guilty. Upon appeal, the Taiwan High Court ruled in May 2011 that Wu was guilty, extending his sentence to 42 months.

In 2007, the Tainan District Prosecutors' Office began investigating Wu for gambling on Chinese Professional Baseball League (CPBL) games. He contested the legislative elections held in January 2008, losing to Lee Chun-yee. In April of that year, the prison sentence in another gambling case against Wu relating to gambling houses in operation between 2004 and 2005 was commuted to a fine. Wu's CPBL gambling case continued with his indictment in August 2008 by prosecutors in Tainan. Further questioning of Wu undertaken in 2010 by Banqiao-based prosecutors established a link to the CPBL's 2009 gambling scandal. Wu was indicted by the Banqiao District Prosecutor's Office in February 2010. The New York Times reported in October 2016 that Wu would order players to be beaten if they refused to participate in match fixing. Following the Banqiao indictment, the Kuomintang expelled Wu. The party ordered affiliated Tainan city councillors to vote for themselves during the 2010 speakership election to keep Wu out of the office. He lost the office to Democratic Progressive Party candidate Lai Mei-hui by nine votes, 30–21. Ten Tainan City Council members were later expelled from the Kuomintang for not following the party's directive.

=== Removal from office and subsequent legal actions ===
Wu was removed from office in May 2011 after the Taiwan High Court found him guilty in the Tsengwen River case. In December 2011, Wu's appeal of the match fixing charges related to the 2007 probe led by the Tainan prosecutors was heard by the Taiwan High Court. He was sentenced to two years imprisonment, which he began serving in January 2012. The same court ruled on the 2009 charges in August 2014, sentencing Wu to 38 months in prison. Wu could not be located by law enforcement to serve this sentence, which was extended to 65 months on appeal due to Wu's attitude during the proceedings. In August 2017, Weng Ping-yao stated that Ma Ying-jeou offered payment for him to kill Alex Tsai in 2007. According to Weng, the deal fell through when Wu was named an additional target. In 2018, Wu was tracked to the Philippines. He was arrested by the Philippine Bureau of Immigration's Fugitive Search Unit on 16 January 2019. On 6 February 2019, Criminal Investigation Bureau officers from Taiwan's National Police Agency flew to Manila to extradite Wu. In April 2020, the Supreme Court upheld the High Court decision to convict Wu on the 2009 game fixing-related charges.

In May 2024, Wu was paroled and released from Taichung Prison.

== Personal life and death ==
Wu's son Wu Yu-huan was a candidate for Tainan City Council in 2014, and won office in 2018 and 2022.

Wu died from esophageal cancer on 8 September 2024, at the age of 73.

== See also ==
- List of fugitives from justice who disappeared
