= Chen Ting-fei =

Taiwanese politician

Chen Ting-fei MLY
- 陳亭妃
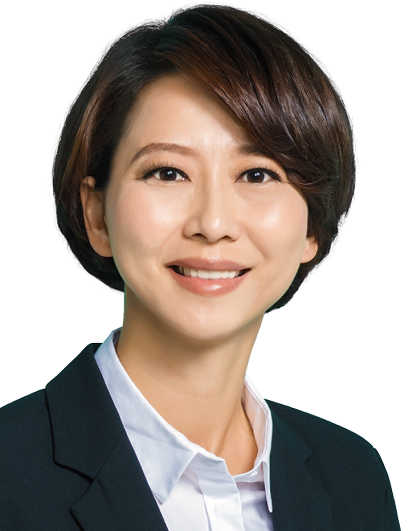

Member of the Legislative Yuan
- Incumbent
- Assumed office 1 February 2008
- Preceded by: Constituency created
- Constituency: Tainan 3

Member of the Tainan City Council
- In office 1 March 1998 – 31 January 2008

Personal details
- Born: July 19, 1974 (age 52) Tainan, Taiwan
- Party: Democratic Progressive Party
- Education: Chinese Culture University (BFA); Chang Jung Christian University (MBA, PhD)

Chen Ting-fei (Chinese: 陳亭妃; pinyin: Chén Tíngfēi; Wade–Giles: Ch'en T'ing-fei; born 19 July 1974) is a Taiwanese politician. A member of the Democratic Progressive Party (DPP), she has served as a member of the Legislative Yuan since 2008. Previously, she was a member of the Tainan City Council from 1998 to 2008.

== Early life and education ==
Born in Tainan, Chen obtained her bachelor's degree from Chinese Culture University in theater arts and earned a master's degree in business administration and a Ph.D. in business administration from Chang Jung Christian University.

== Political career ==
In 1998, Chen Ting-fei was elected as Tainan city councilor and served two terms from 1998 to 2008, before being elected into the Legislative Yuan.

Chen has been member of the Legislative Yuan since 2008, representing Tainan.

In September 2023, along with fellow legislators such as Chang Hung-lu, Chen traveled to the United States to join a New York City march in support of Taiwan's bid to join the United Nations.
