= 2025 Taiwanese mass electoral recall campaigns =

Civic anti-Kuomintang campaign

- 大罷免, 大罷免潮
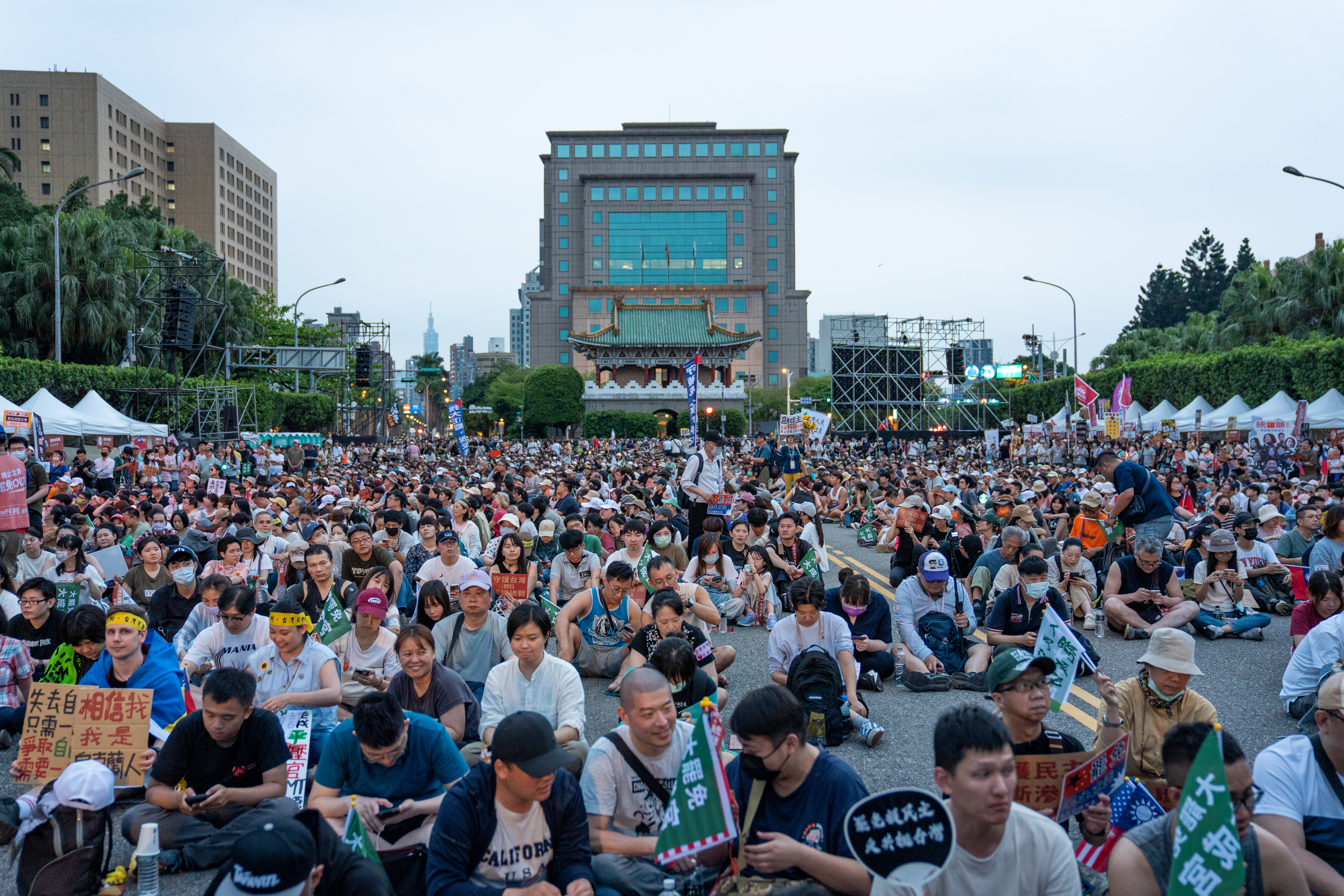
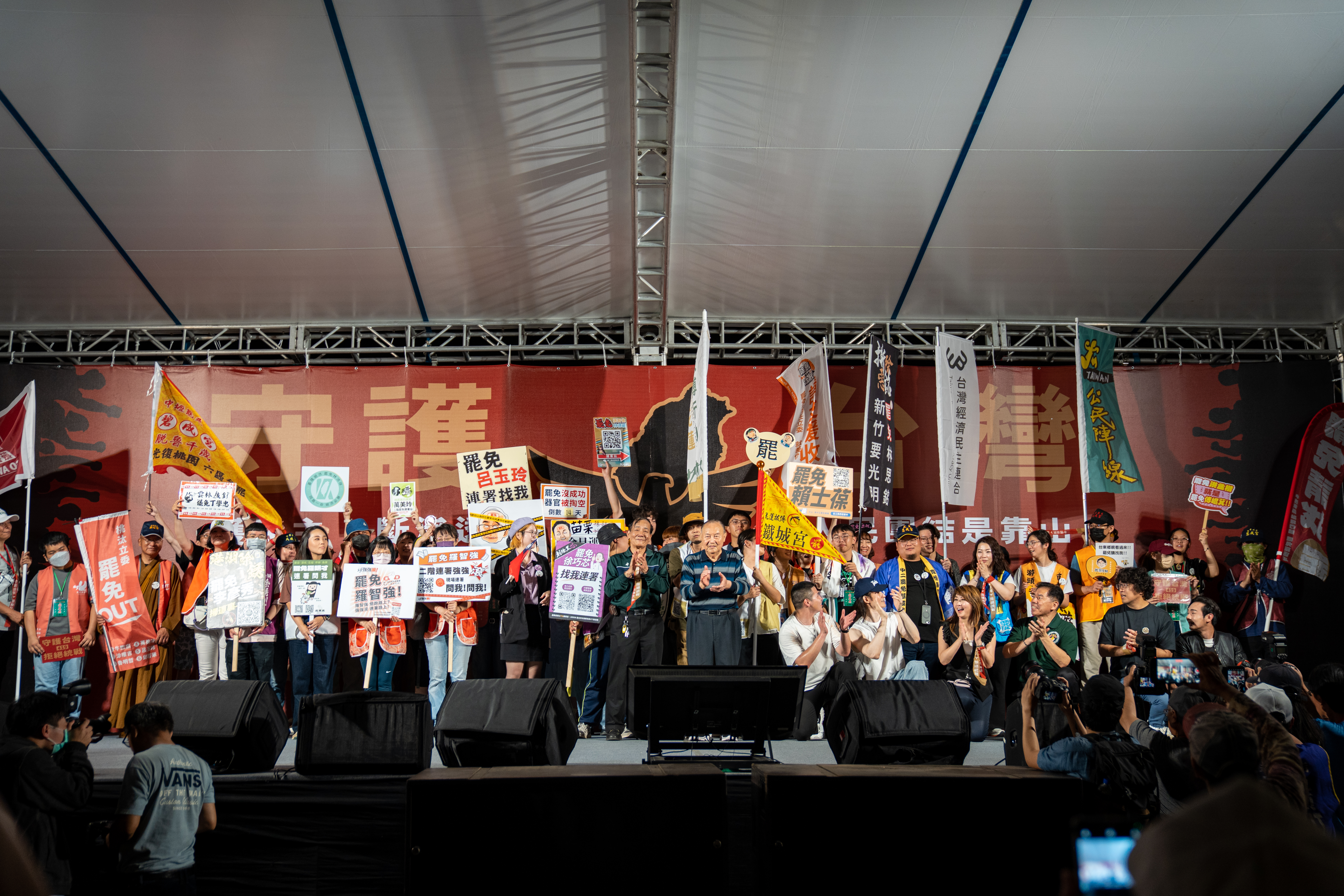
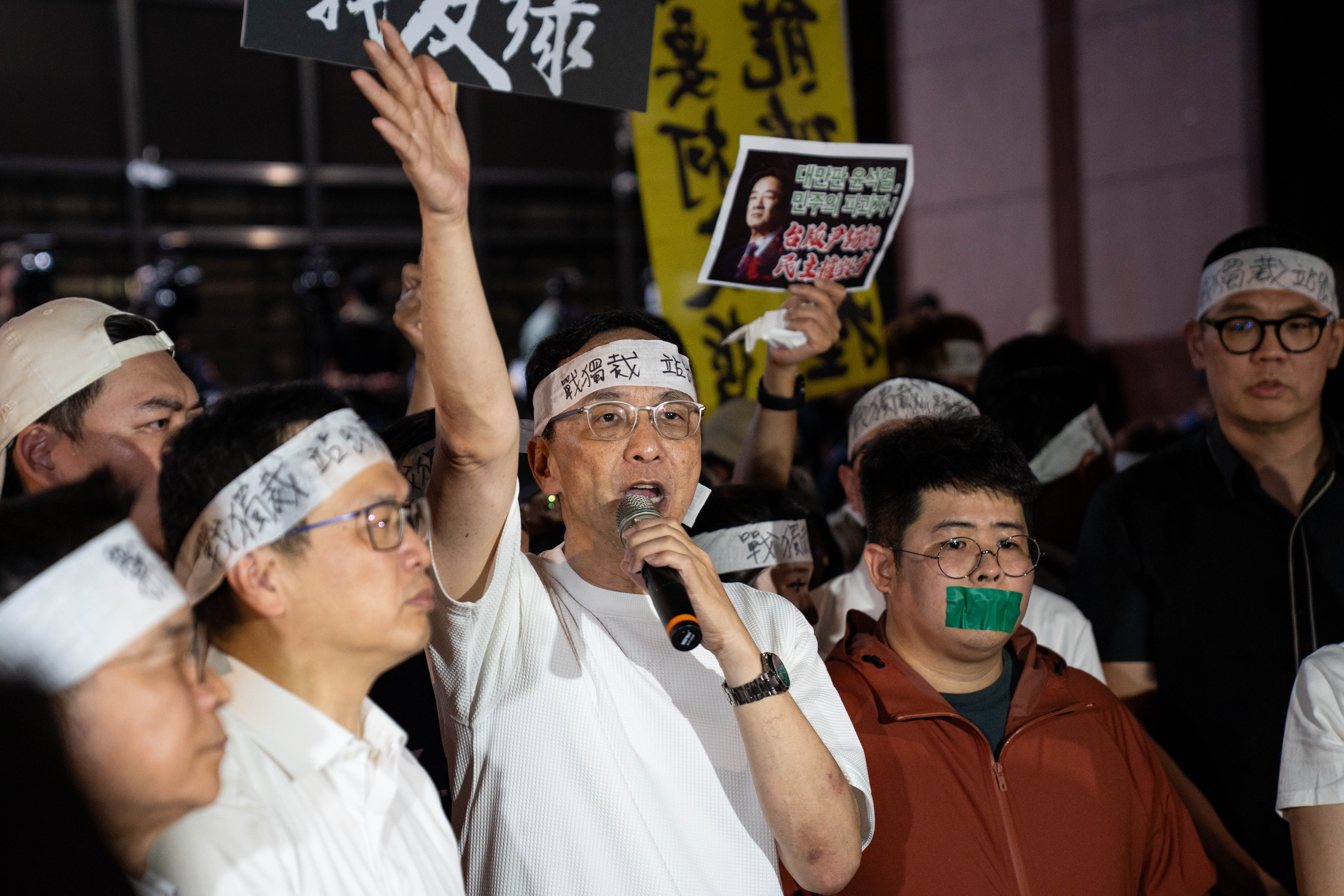
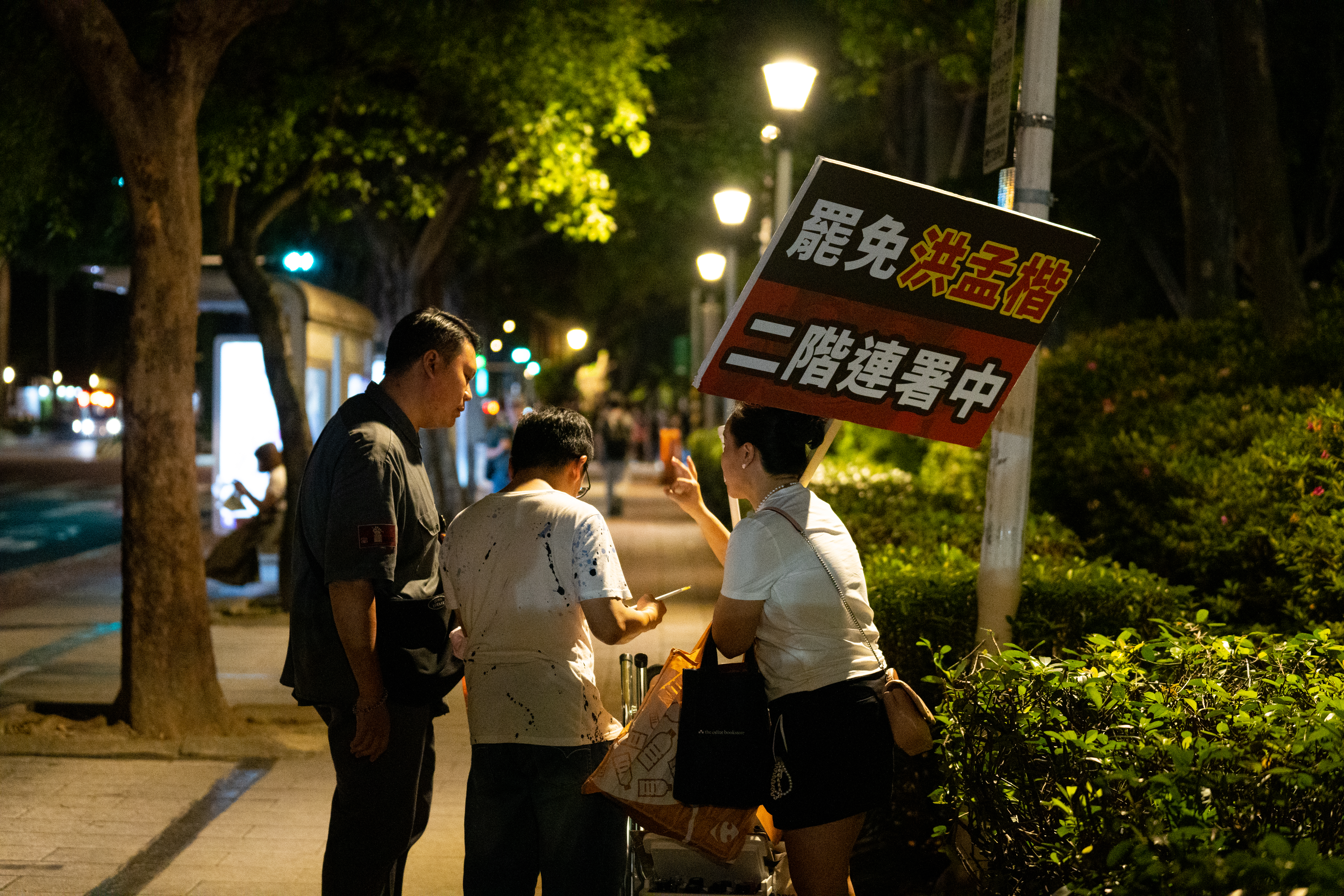
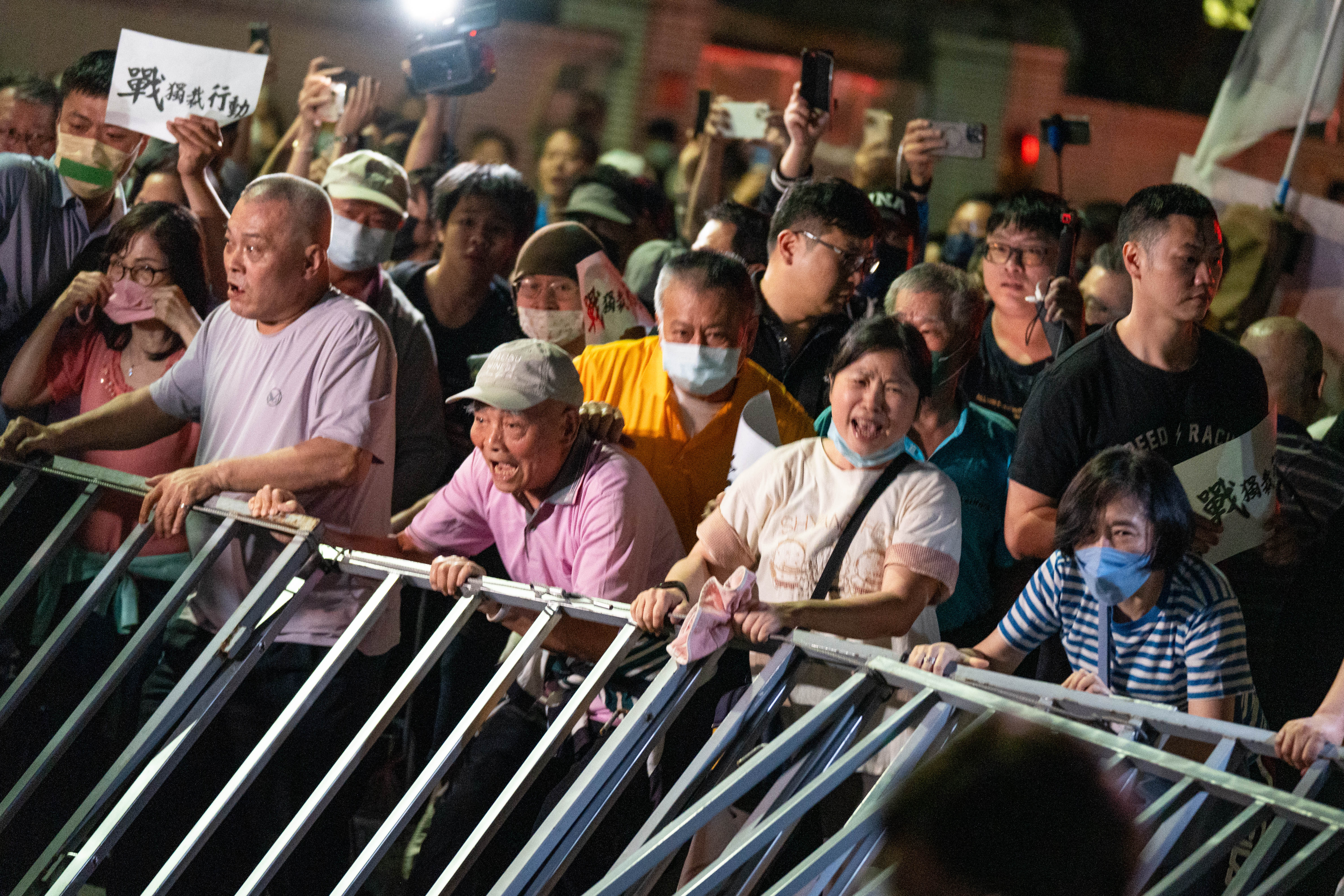
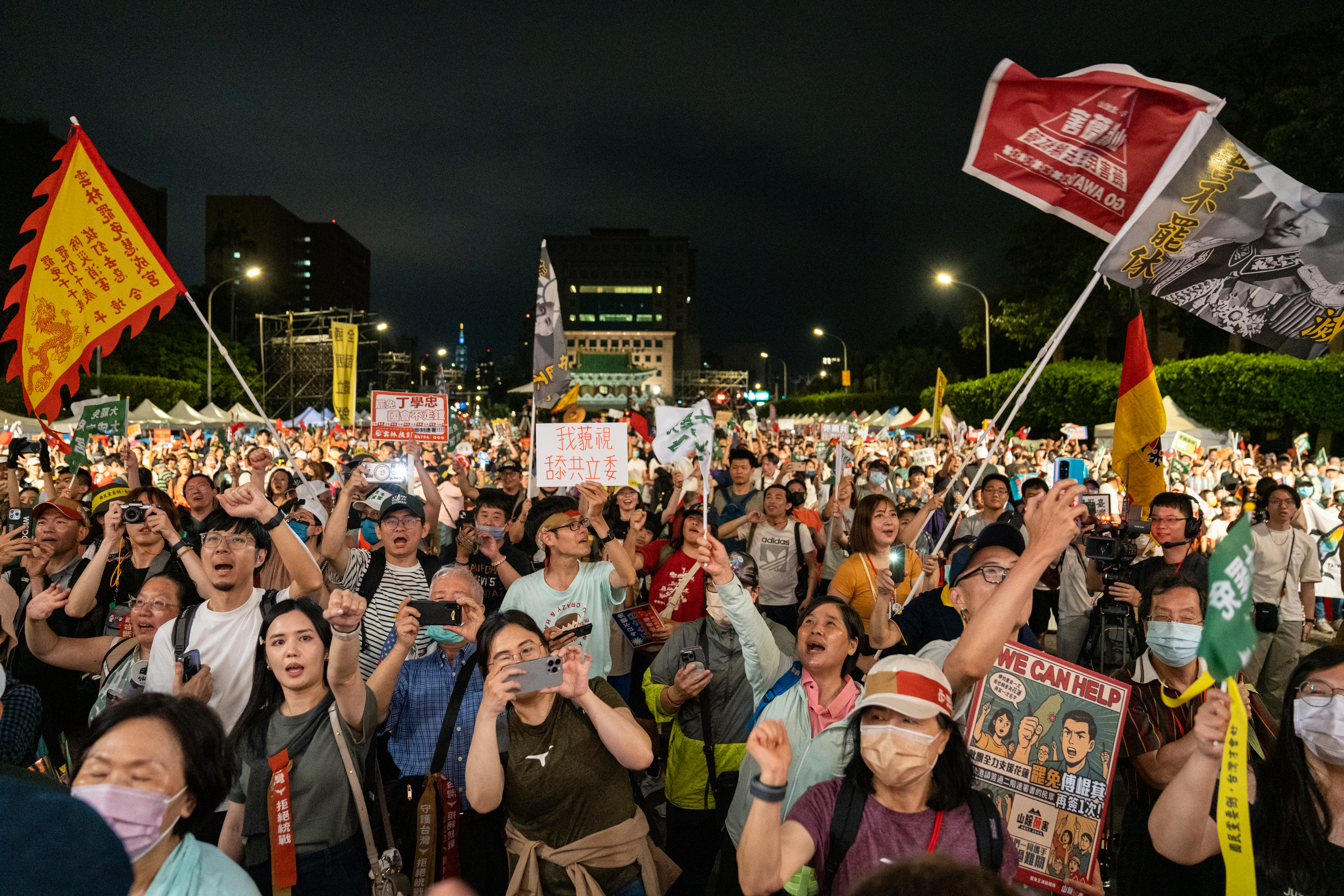
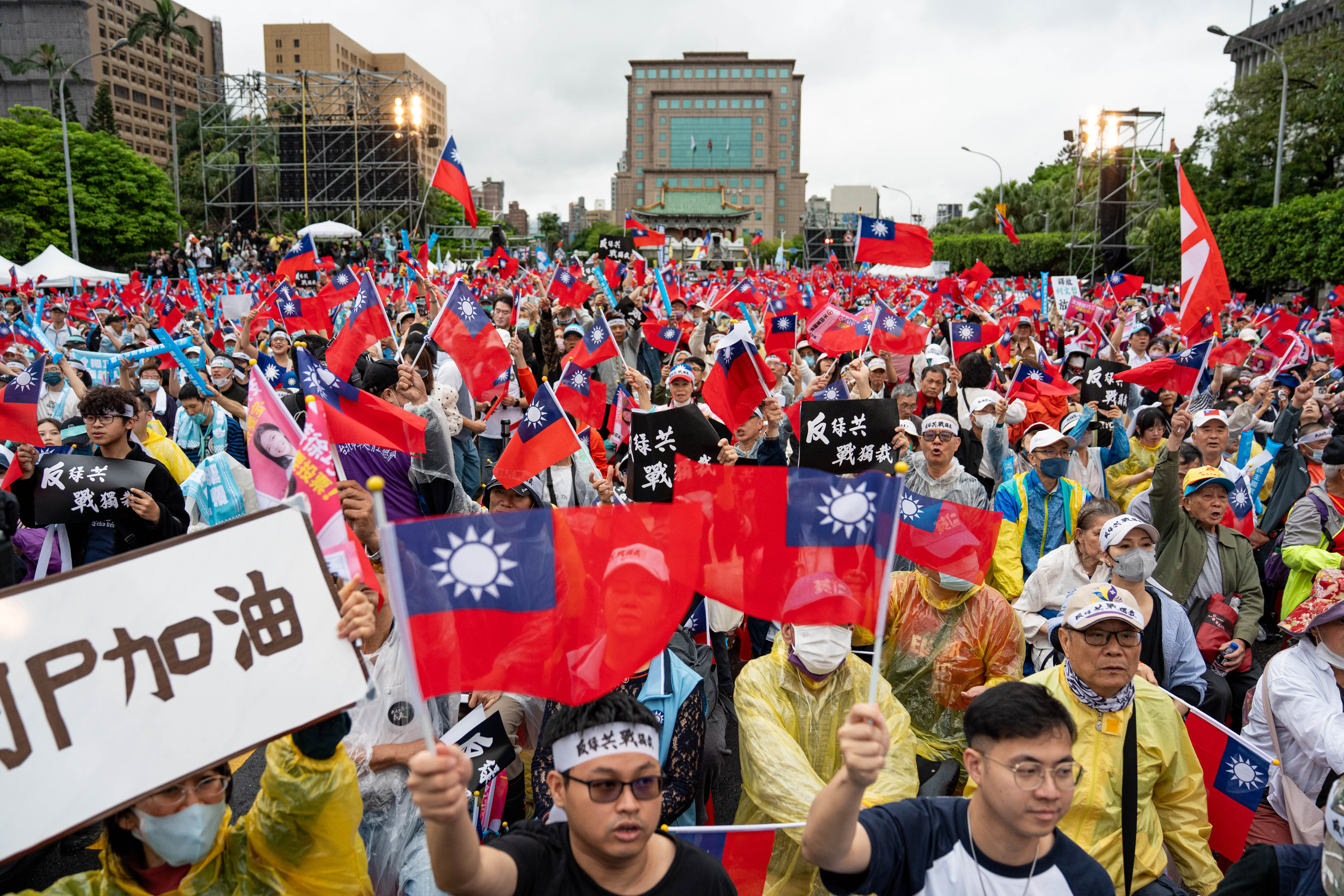
- Propaganda, rallies, marches and demonstrations during Mass Recall Campaigns
- Date: 1 February 2025 – 23 August 2025 (6 months, 3 weeks and 1 day)
- Location: Taiwan
- Caused by: Controversy over the 11th Legislative Yuan’s exercise of legislative power and the central government's budget review power; Concerns about the Chinese Communist Party's involvement in the politics of Taiwan
- Goals: Recall elected public servants, mainly legislators, and later expanded to mayors and county councilors.
- Methods: Recall votes
- Result: Pan-Blue Coalition Victory; The recall proposals for a DPP county councilor in Nantou, the mayor of Hsinchu and 31 KMT legislators were rejected. KMT remained the largest party in Legislative Yuan.

Parties
Pan-Green Coalition; DPP; NPP; Statebuilding Party; SDP; Solidarity; Green; Supported by: TWACDA; KMT886; Obasang; WUFI; TNC	Pan-Blue Coalition; Led by: KMT; Supported by: TPP; Clean Greenguards; New Party; Judicial Revolution Party

Lead figures
Robert Tsao; Puma Shen; Pa Chiung; Mannam PYC; Ker Chien-ming; Lai Ching-te	Eric Chu; Huang Kuo-chang; Han Kuo-yu

The 2025 Taiwanese mass electoral recall campaigns, also known as the "Great Recall Wave" (大罷免潮) or "Great Recall" (大罷免) in Chinese, were political campaigns and social movements to recall elected officials in Taiwan from February 2025 to August 2025. The recall of several targets proceeded to votes, including thirty-one KMT legislators, one independent mayor, and a DPP councilor. In total, thirty-two individuals affiliated with the pan-Blue camp and independents failed to be recalled because the number of dissenting votes exceeded supporting votes, while the DPP councilor, despite receiving more supporting than opposing votes, did not pass the legal threshold and therefore also survived the recall.

On July 26, recall votes were held for 24 members of the Legislative Yuan and the mayor of Hsinchu City. All recall attempts failed, with a majority of voters rejecting them in each case. On August 23, alongside the referendum on the reactivation of the Maanshan Nuclear Power Plant (核三), seven additional recall proposals for legislators were also scheduled, all of which also were unsuccessful.

== Background ==
In 2024, after the inauguration of Kuomintang (KMT) and Taiwan People's Party (TPP) legislators in the 11th Legislative Yuan, a series of controversies arose, including the reforms to legislative powers, the passage of three major bills—the Constitutional Court Procedure Act (CCPA), the Public Officials Election and Recall Act, and the Act Governing the Allocation of Government Revenues and Expenditures—as well as budget cuts to the 2025 national budget. These bills would redistribute portions of national budget from the central to local governments, most of which are controlled by the KMT, expand the powers of parliament to the detriment of the executive (DPP-led) and obstruct the functioning of the constitutional court.

In response, the Democratic Progressive Party (DPP) and civic groups launched the Bluebird Movement in an attempt to block the passage of these controversial bills. However, due to their numerical disadvantage in the Legislative Yuan, they were ultimately unable to prevent the KMT–TPP coalition from passing all the proposed legislation.

As a result, civic groups began organizing petitions to recall certain KMT legislators. On 4 January, DPP caucus leader Ker Chien-ming publicly called for a large-scale recall of all KMT district legislators. The first recall vote proposals were submitted on 3 February, the earliest possible day given that only lawmakers who have been in office for at least a year are eligible for recall. As of 10 March, recall campaigns had been expanded to include 34 of 39 KMT district legislators. In response, the KMT also initiated counter-recall efforts against fifteen DPP legislators. The movement eventually expanded to include local government officials, such as mayors and councilors, evolving into a nationwide recall battle between the pan-blue and pan-green camps.

By June 2025, all recall petitions against Democratic Progressive Party members of the Legislative Yuan had stalled. The only successful recall petition against a DPP-affiliated politician was levied against Nantou County Councilor Chen Yu-ling, and was held on 13 July.

On 20 June 2025, the Central Election Commission scheduled the recall elections for 26 July 2025, and stated that 24 lawmakers and the mayor of Hsinchu were subject to recall votes. On 2 July, the CEC scheduled recalls for two more KMT legislators on 23 August, the same day as a nuclear power referendum is to be held. Five more recall votes against KMT lawmakers were approved by the CEC on 18 July and scheduled for 23 August.

The Central Election Commission placed a moratorium on the gathering, publication, and dissemination of recall polling data from 16 July, and stated that television presentations about the recalls would be aired between 16 and 25 July.

== Organisation ==
The campaign against opposition lawmakers and councillors was organised by pan-green local groups, supported by TWACDA (反共護台志工聯盟), KMT886, and Democratic Progressive Party, with allies from the Pan-Green Coalition including New Power Party, Taiwan Statebuilding Party, Social Democratic Party, Taiwan Solidarity Party, Green Party Taiwan, Taiwan Obasang Political Equality Party, World United Formosans for Independence, and Taiwan New Constitution Foundation.

The Kuomintang was the major leader in the campaign of attempting to unseat pro-government politicians, along with other local groups. Taiwan People's Party and "Clean Greenguards", a group established by TPP leader Huang Kuo-chang, supported the KMT's bid which also gained backing from New Party and Judicial Revolution Party.

== Results ==
For a recall to be successful, the number of votes in favor must meet the threshold of one-quarter of all eligible voters in the given constituency while also exceeding the votes against. The recall case for the County Councilor in Nantou failed on 13 July. All of the 25 recall cases that voted on 26 July failed to meet the criteria. In response, Lai Ching-te stated that the recalls, despite being unsuccessful, ensure that anti-communism and protection of Taiwan are principal direction of the nation's policies. None of the 7 other recall votes held on 23 August met the threshold either, totaling 0 successful recall attempts throughout the entirety of the Great Recall movement, allowing KMT to maintain their legislative plurality, and opposition (KMT, TPP and independent) to keep their legislative majority. Following the recall votes, DPP legislative leaders including caucus whip Rosalia Wu, caucus secretary-general Chen Pei-yu, and Chen's deputies Lin Yueh-chin and Kuo Yu-ching announced their resignations.

== Criticism ==
Former Vice President Annette Lu (DPP), has expressed criticism of the "Great Recall Movement," highlighting concerns about the potential for authoritarian tendencies within the party. She cautioned that the DPP might be overemphasizing anti-China rhetoric, potentially diverting attention from pressing domestic issues. Additionally, she warned against the pursuit of one-party dominance, suggesting that such actions could undermine Taiwan's democratic principles.

Former Premier Frank Hsieh (DPP) also commented on the movement, describing recalls as unfortunate events that reflect a negative cycle in Taiwanese politics. He expressed concern that the frequent use of recalls indicates a breakdown in the legislative process, where issues are not being addressed through proper channels, leading to a reliance on recalls as a form of political expression.
