= Yixin Chen =

American computer scientist (born 1979)

- Born: 16 June 1979 (age 47)
- Awards: Fellow, Association for the Advancement of Artificial Intelligence; Fellow, Institute of Electrical and Electronics Engineers; Fellow, Asia-Pacific Artificial Intelligence Association

Academic background
- Education: University of Science and Technology of China; University of Illinois at Urbana-Champaign

Academic work
- Discipline: Computer science, machine learning, deep learning
- Institutions: Washington University in St. Louis

Yixin Chen is a professor of computer science and engineering at Washington University in St. Louis. He is known for his contributions to deep learning systems.

Chen is an IEEE Fellow and an AAAI Fellow.

== Life and career ==
Chen completed his Bachelor's in Computer Science from the University of Science and Technology of China in 1999 and Master's in Computer Science from the University of Illinois at Urbana-Champaign in 2001. He then pursued his Ph.D. in computer science from the University of Illinois at Urbana-Champaign and completed it in 2005.

Chen started his academic career Washington University in St. Louis in 2005. As of 2025, he is a professor in the department of Computer Science and Engineering in the McKelvey School of Engineering and the Director of the Center for Collaborative Human-AI Learning and Operation (HALO) at Washington University.

== Research ==
Chen's research is focused on computer sciences, in the fields of machine learning, deep learning, and data mining. He has made contributions to artificial intelligence in healthcare, optimization algorithms, data mining, and computational biomedicine.

=== Resource efficient deep learning ===
Chen has conducted research on compactness and applicability of deep neural networks (DNNs). He proposed the concept and architecture of lightweight DNNs. His group invented the HashedNets architecture, which compresses prohibitively large DNNs into much smaller networks using a weight-sharing scheme.

Chen also developed a compression framework for convolutional neural networks (CNNs). His lab invented a frequency-sensitive compression technique in which more important model parameters are better preserved.

=== Deep learning on graphs and time series ===
Chen and his students proposed DGCNN, one of the first graph convolution techniques that can learn a meaningful tensor representation from arbitrary graphs, and showed its deep connection to the Weisfeiler-Lehman algorithm. They applied GNNs to link prediction (in the well-known SEAL algorithm) and matrix completion and achieved record results.

For time series classification, Chen advocated using a multi-scale convolutional neuronal network, also known as MCNN, citing its computational efficiency. He illustrated that MCNN brings out features at varying frequencies and scales by leveraging GPU computing, contrary to other frameworks that can only retract features at a single-time-scale.

== Awards and honors ==
- 2007 – Microsoft Research New Faculty Fellowship
- 2022 – Fellow, Institute of Electrical and Electronics Engineers
- 2025 – Fellow, Association for the Advancement of Artificial Intelligence

== Bibliography ==
=== Books ===
- Introduction to Explainable Artificial Intelligence (2022) ISBN 9787121431876

=== Selected articles ===
- Chen, Y., & Tu, L. (2007, August). Density-based clustering for real-time stream data. In Proceedings of the 13th ACM SIGKDD international conference on Knowledge discovery and data mining (pp. 133–142).
- Chen, W., Wilson, J., Tyree, S., Weinberger, K., & Chen, Y. (2015, June). Compressing neural networks with the hashing trick. In International conference on machine learning (pp. 2285–2294). PMLR.
- Cui, Z., Chen, W., & Chen, Y. (2016). Multi-scale convolutional neural networks for time series classification. arXiv preprint arXiv:1603.06995.
- Zhang, M., Cui, Z., Neumann, M., & Chen, Y. (2018, April). An end-to-end deep learning architecture for graph classification. In Proceedings of the AAAI conference on artificial intelligence (Vol. 32, No. 1).
- Zhang, M., & Chen, Y. (2018). Link prediction based on graph neural networks. Advances in neural information processing systems, 31.
