= Shi Jin-Hua =

Taiwanese contemporary artist (1964–2024)

Shi Jin-hua
- Born: 石晉華 Shi Jin-hua; 1964; Penghu, Taiwan
- Died: 28 June 2024 (aged 60); Kaohsiung, Taiwan
- Education: Taiwan National University of Arts, University of California, Irvine
- Known for: Painting, Performance Arts
- Movement: Conceptual art
- Website: www.shijinhua.com

Shi Jin-Hua (Chinese: 石晉華; 1964 – 28 June 2024) was a Taiwanese contemporary artist, known predominantly for conceptual arts and performance; notably for his work, Pen Walking, shown at Taipei Fine Arts Museum in 2008.

== Background ==
Shi was born in Penghu in 1964. He was diagnosed with diabetes at age of 17.

Shi graduated from National Taiwan Normal University in 1990. He obtained M.F.A from University of California, Irvine in 1996.

Shi was killed on 28 June 2024, when a car collided with his bicycle as he rode home from his studio in Kaohsiung. He was 60.

== See also ==
- Taiwanese art
