= Cheng Chung-chuan =

Taiwanese painter (1931–2024)

Cheng Chung-chuan (Chinese: 鄭瓊娟, 1931 – 6 January 2024) was a Taiwanese painter, born in Hsinchu City, Taiwan. She was the granddaughter of philanthropist Lee His-Cin.

While majoring in Fine Arts at National Taiwan Normal University, Cheng Chung-chuan joined the May Art Society, founded by professor Liao Chi-chun in 1957. By the end of the same year, she gave up her studies and decided to reside in Japan with her husband. She did not work on any paintings for more than 30 years until she was nearly 60.

After that, she started holding solo exhibitions in Japan, then returned to her native Hsinchu in 2003. Back in Taiwan, she joined annual exhibitions of the May Art Society. Just before her 80th birthday, the Sun Yat-Sen Memorial Hall in Guangzhou staged her art at an exhibition in 2011. Besides that, a private charity auction also took place to display her works for the benefit of the mental and physically disabled residents in Hsinchu. In 2013, the Taipei Fine Arts Museum invited Cheng Chung-chuan to join the group exhibition “Women Adventurers: Five Eras of Taiwanese Art, 1930-1983”.

She enjoyed leading a tranquil life and contentedly creating works.

Cheng died in Taipei on 6 January 2024.

== Art characteristics ==
Cheng Chung-chuan learned painting from several professors at National Taiwan Normal University, such as Liao Chi-chun, Lee Shih-chiao, Chu Teh-chun, and Puru. Cheng frequently painted still life portraits, and her art style tended to be realistic. After marrying a dentist, she devoted her attention to the family for several decades.

By the end of 1980s, she began to paint again. While living in Japan, Cheng rarely traveled, so the mountains or rivers featured in her works are imagined. Moreover, some of her compositions look like veins or nerves and prove that medical books exert a strong influence on her. Regarding colors, the artist appreciates noble golden, mysterious black, passionate red colors. Her works convey elegance, warmth, and vigor. Being a kind and simple artist, Cheng Chung-chuan considered that she was a fortunate person and aimed to express love and positive ideas to everyone through her sincere creations.

== Artworks ==
- Ourartnet.Com
- Radiant 162x112cm Oil on Canvas 2007
- Celebration 91x72.5cm Oil on Canvas 2001
- Tai-Chi VII 50x60.5cm Oil on Canvas 2003
- Innocent 45.5x53cm Oil on Canvas 2003

== See also ==
- Taiwanese art
