= Chen I-hsin =

Taiwanese economist and politician

- 陳以信
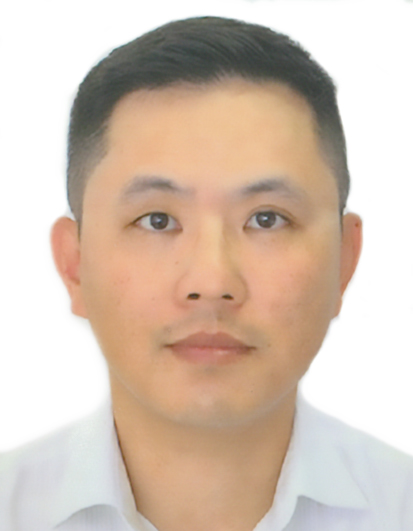

Member of the Legislative Yuan
- In office February 1, 2020 – January 31, 2024
- Constituency: National At-Large

Personal details
- Born: October 30, 1972 (age 53) Yunlin, Taiwan
- Party: Kuomintang
- Education: National Taiwan University (BA); SOAS University of London (MSc, PhD)
- Scientific career
- Fields: Econometrics
- Thesis: The dynamics of privatisation in China (1994-2008): An empirical and econometric analysis (2014)

Chen I-hsin (Chinese: 陳以信; born 30 October 1972), also known by his English name Charles Chen, is a Taiwanese economist, econometrician, and politician. He was a member of the Legislative Yuan from 2020 to 2024.

== Early life and education ==
Chen I-hsin was born in Yunlin County on 30 October 1972. After attending Cheng Kung Senior High School, he began studying mathematics at Fu Jen Catholic University, then transferred and graduated from National Taiwan University with a bachelor's degree in political science and international relations. He then completed graduate studies in England at the SOAS University of London, where he earned an M.Sc. in development studies and a Ph.D. in economics with a specialization in econometrics in 2014. His doctoral dissertation was titled, "The dynamics of privatisation in China (1994-2008): An empirical and econometric analysis".

After receiving his doctorate, Chen completed postdoctoral research as a postdoctoral fellow at the University of Cambridge.

== Political career ==
=== Spokesperson of Kuomintang and Office of the President ===
Chen served as the spokesperson for the Kuomintang, but left the position to return to SOAS and pursue doctoral studies in economics. By 2014, Chen had resumed his spokesperson duties, while also working for the Kuomintang's Culture and Communication Committee. In February 2015, he was named a spokesman for the Office of the President, serving until 2016, when Ma Ying-jeou concluded his second term as president.

=== Presiding the first national language interpretation session in Legislation Yuan ===
Chen contested the 2020 legislative election as a party list candidate affiliated with the Kuomintang, and was seated to the Tenth Legislative Yuan.

As the Development of National Languages Act in 2018 stipulates the government offices to provide the interpretation services for the citizens participating in administrative, legislative, and judicial procedures to freely choose to use their national languages, the Legislative Yuan activated the synchronized interpreter service for the parliament session in real time accordingly. On 27 September 2021, after following the steps to apply in advance with 3 Taiwanese interpreters been present ready, Legislator Chen Po-wei of the Taiwan Statebuilding Party proceeded his scheduled questioning in Taiwanese during the session of Foreign and National Defense Committee. The Minister of National Defense Chiu Kuo-cheng was communicated but rejected speaking Taiwanese, nor accepted the interpreter's real-time service at site, but brought the deputy minister Zong-hsiao Li as his own interpreter, and insisted in the 3-way translation pattern sentence by sentence. Chiu repeatedly interrupted the question process by asking Chen to speak Mandarin Chinese for easier communication, or the session time cannot be lengthened to accommodate the interpretation, however Li is not a linguistic professional, hence his translation contains contextual errors, so Chen, being the chairman host in duty, had to intervene when the argument occurred, and introduced the existing synchronized interpretation in progress as the solution same as the common conference practice in the other countries; nonetheless Chiu never picked up the earset, yet insisted his way till the session run out of time. Chen later apologized to the public for the good intention of practicing the national language law being turned into a linguistic communication tragedy, and condemned Chiu for "bullying" (鴨霸), nevertheless Chiu denied the allegation and claimed that a language is a tool of communication. The parliamentary interpretation service were temporarily suspended afterwards pending on better communication in the future - consequently Kuan, the other MPs and media editorials such as the Taipei Times commented that Language is not just a tool of communication as Chiu said, but also an identity of feelings and culture. Taipei City Councilor Miao Poya also explained that the multi-lingual working environment is essential for a healthy mind without the "Chinese Language Supremacy" (華語至上) attitude to achieve the international level in diversity, equality and mutual respect for a modern state.

He was considered a potential Kuomintang candidate for the Tainan mayoralty in the 2022 Taiwanese local elections, until March 2022, when the party chose to nominate Hsieh Lung-chieh.
