= Pa Chiung =

Taiwanese YouTuber (born 1994)

攝徒日記FunTV
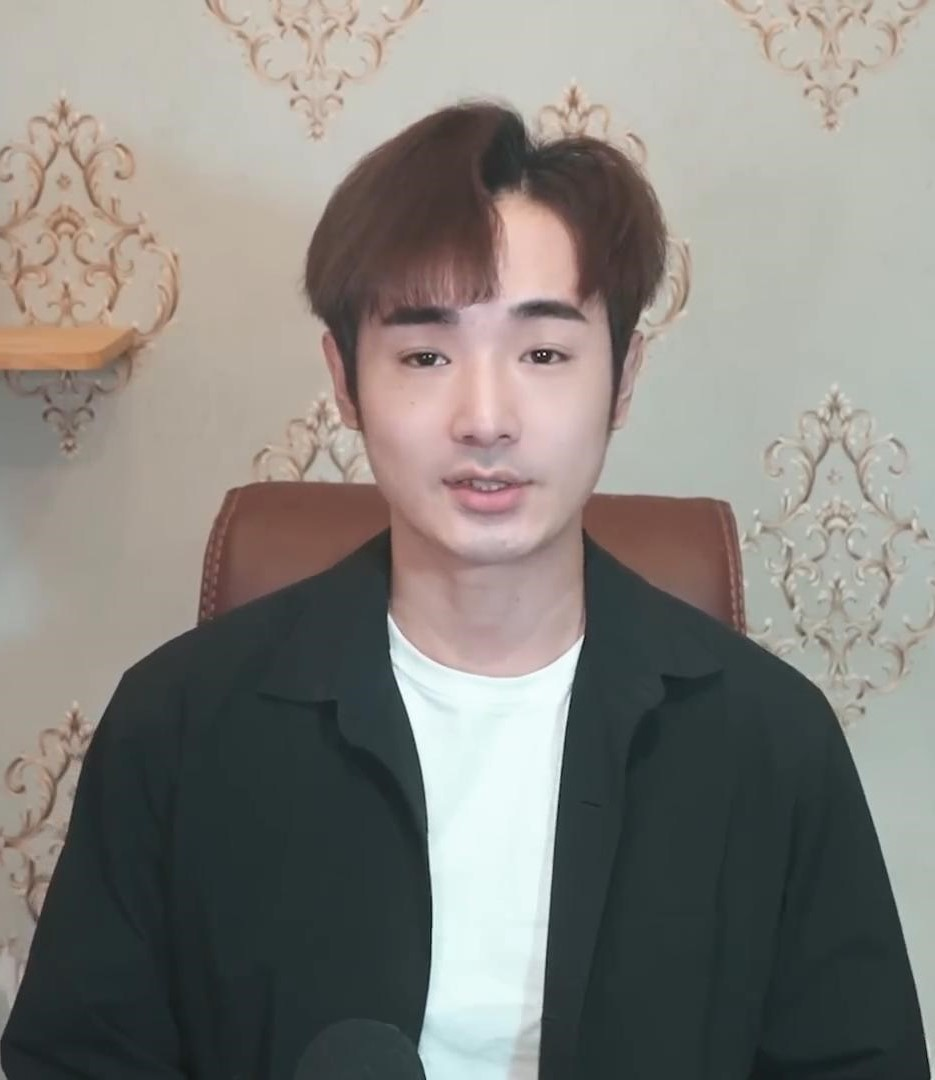
- Wun Zihyu, 2023
- Born: Wun Zih-yu; November 7, 1994 (age 31); Hualien County, Taiwan
- Other name: Pa Chiung (八炯)
- Education: Department of Motion Pictures and Video Communication, Chung Chou University of Science and Technology
- Occupation: YouTuber

YouTube information
- Channel: 攝徒日記Fun TV
- Years active: 2019-present
- Subscribers: 1.35 million
- Views: 1.06 billion
- Last updated: 20 September 2026

Wun Zih-yu (Chinese: 溫子渝), also known as Pa Chiung (八炯), is a Taiwanese YouTuber. He is a member of the indigenous Taroko ethnic group in Xincheng Township, Hualien County. In the early days, his channel 攝徒日記 (lit. "Photographer's Diary"), mainly introduced the food, drink, entertainment, and travel delicacies of Hualien and Yilan. Since 2018, he has switched to commenting on the People's Republic of China politics and Taiwan's international relations. Most of its presentation styles and cover titles are hyperbolic and satirical.

== Early life ==
Pa Chiung graduated from the Information Processing Department of the National Hualien Commercial High School (國立花蓮高商) in 2013 and enrolled in the Department of Motion Pictures and Video Communication, Chung Chou University of Science and Technology.

In July 2017, he represented the university and went to Shanghai and Suzhou in mainland China to participate in the "Third International College Student New Media Original Works Competition" (第三屆國際大學生新媒體原創作品大賽) organized by the School of Communication of Soochow University in Suzhou. The video work "Deadly Confrontation" (奪命交鋒) created by him with 7 classmates won the third prize in the video category. This work is also known as "Deadly Live" (奪命直播). He is responsible for directing, editing, lighting, and dubbing. He also plays the role of "Lin Guohuei", an investigator of the Ministry of Justice in the film. The crew is called "Free Style". They operate a fan page and a YouTube channel called "The Director is a rogue" (導演是流氓), which later became the YouTube channel "Photographer's Diary Fun TV" (攝徒日記 Fun TV).

In his channel, he often criticizes pro-CCP artists and conducts live debates with the Little Pink. He ranks 69th in the list of Taiwan's Top 100 Most Influential Internet Celebrities in 2021 (2021台灣100大影響力網紅) and 4th in 2021 Top 100 Internet Celebrity Popularity Poll (2021百大網紅人氣票選).

== Controversy ==
In the early morning of February 19, 2023, he called the police after a drunken argument with his girlfriend. The police found that there was no illegal situation and did not intervene. Unexpectedly, he was agitated, pushed against the police, kept making loud noises, and started a live broadcast on his mobile phone to accuse the police of having a bad attitude, making loud noises, and pushing people. He also emphasized that "I am a person with almost 700,000 subscriptions." The police had to take him back to the police station. After he sobered up, he clarified the misunderstanding with the police and joked to himself, "If this had happened in China, I would have been beaten to death by the police!" On the afternoon of February 19, 2023, the Haishan Precinct of the New Taipei City Police Department posted on Facebook explaining what happened that night. Pa Chiung was dissatisfied with widespread media reports that he was drunk and causing trouble, so he posted a video on his YouTube channel on February 21, accusing the police of lying. On February 22, he went to the New Taipei City District Prosecutor's Office to file a complaint, suing the chief and police officers of Xinhai Police Station for illegal detention, coercion, and injury, and also filed a defamation lawsuit against the reporting media.

=== Other Youtubers ===
On December 6, 2024, he released the film "China's United Front Documentary", which he shot together with singer-songwriter Chen Po-Yuan (陳柏源, also known as Mannam PYC (閩南狼PYC)). In the video, they revealed the methods used by the government of the People's Republic of China and the Chinese Communist Party (CCP) to "coax" certain Taiwanese internet celebrities to launch a united front against Taiwanese people, attack Taiwan's liberal and democratic system, and attack the Democratic Progressive Party government. The video also shows the existence of an economic network into which pro-China influencers are drawn because it becomes their significant source of income. Chen Baiyuan bluntly said that the problem lies in "the difference between political systems, democracy and autocracy."

On December 7, Lee Dong-hyun, the taekwondo coach who appeared in the video, responded that he was set up and criticized the video for cutting out the beginning and end of the recording and deliberately distorting the facts just to seek benefits in Taiwan. One of the internet celebrities named, Chung Ming-hsuan, responded on the Threads platform, saying that the travel videos he produced and released were all funded by himself, and expressed his dissatisfaction with such unfounded accusations, pointing out that some people "don't care about evidence and just put labels on my head."

When Pro-CCP internet celebrity Holger Chen criticized Pa Chiung was a screenwriter and storyteller. Chen was not happy about Pa Chiung talked about Xi Jinping's wife with ease, and the audience did not doubt how he knew these inside stories. Chen argued that Pa Chiung's remarks could not be trusted. Pa Chiung responded on Facebook, sarcastically saying that Holger Chen had never been to the United States, Japan and South Korea. Pa Chiung claimed that he had been invited by an American think tank to attend meetings with members of the US Congress, and said Chen should "read more" and learn more about China. Pa Chiung told Chen that the professional terms for people analysis and comments on China's current situation should be called "Zhongnanhai listeners" (中南海聽床師), not "screenwriter", thereby satirizing Chen's desire to please the CCP but his lack of research on Chinese politics.

Several named pro-CCP influencers responded to the video, saying they were being framed and that the video had been edited.

On December 11, Zhu Fenglian, head of the Taiwan Affairs Office of the Central Committee of the Chinese Communist Party, responded that the video was an exercise in "cognitive warfare."

=== Bounty Notices ===
On November 13, 2025, the Quanzhou Public Security Bureau of Fujian Province issued a reward notice, announcing that it had opened a case for investigation against Pa Chiung and Mannam PYC. The notice disclosed the personal information of the two, including their photos, real names and ID numbers, and accused them of posting "anti-China and protect Taiwan" and "relying on the United States to seek independence" on social media platforms for a long time, and suspected them of inciting secession. The Public Security Bureau offered a reward of RMB 50,000 to RMB 250,000 (about NT$220,000 to NT$1 million) for clues to help arrest them, and emphasized that those who harbored them would be held legally responsible.

Faced with the mainland's wanted notices and bounties, both Ba Jiong and Minnan Wolf have taken a public counterattack stance. Ba Jiong posted a video on his YouTube channel, arguing that the reward of only one million New Taiwan Dollars was "humiliating to the Taiwanese people," and sarcastically questioning whether the China's financial situation was experiencing difficulties.

He subsequently issued a "reverse bounty notice," claiming to offer the same reward to Wang Huning, a member of the Standing Committee of the Political Bureau of the CPC Central Committee and Chairman of the National Committee of the Chinese People's Political Consultative Conference, and Song Tao, Director of the Taiwan Affairs Office of the CPC Central Committee, accusing them of violating the "crime of colluding with the enemy and splitting the country" under the Constitution of the Republic of China.
