= 2024 Taiwanese legislative reform controversy =

Political protests in Taiwan

Bluebird Movement
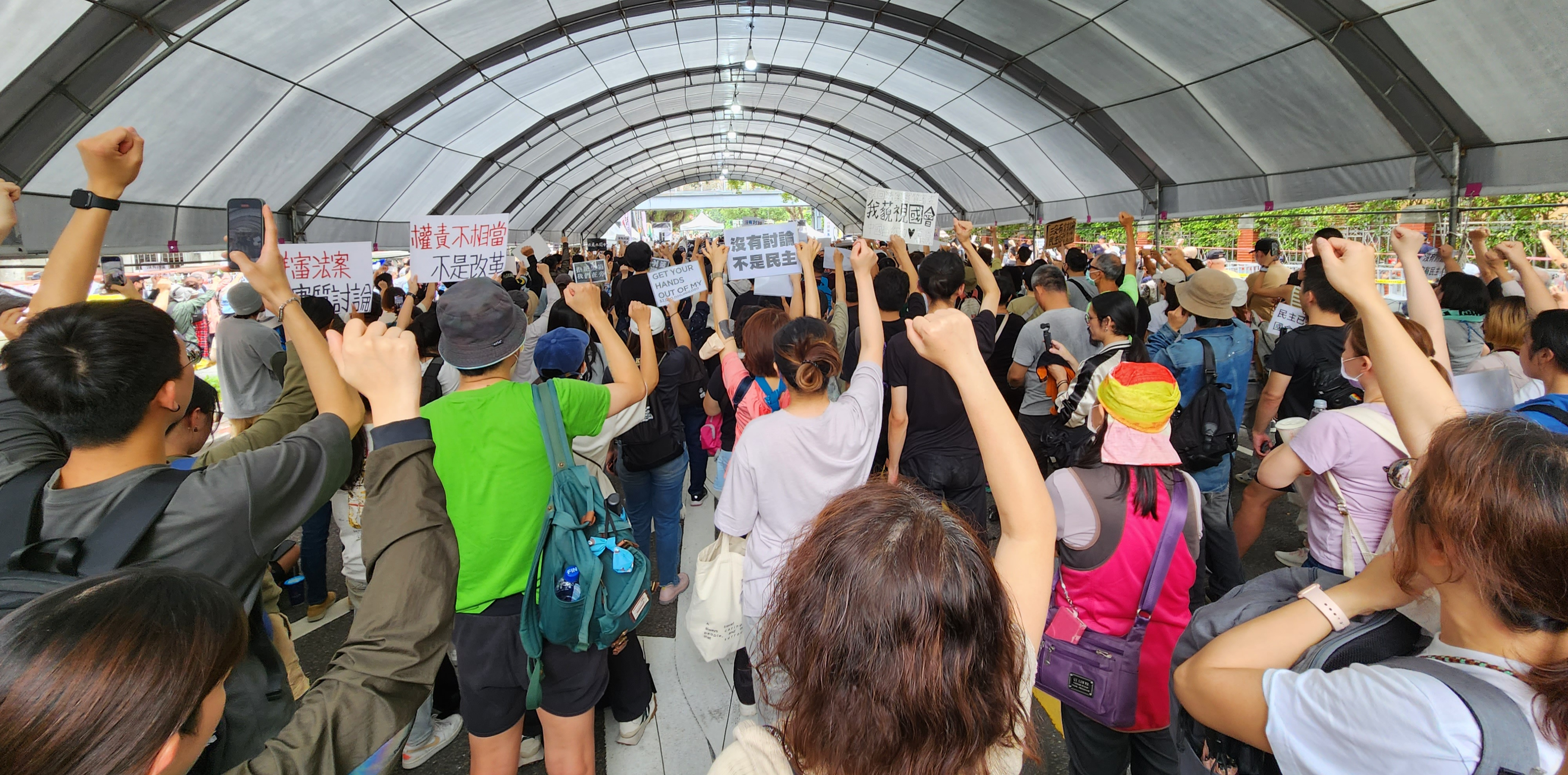
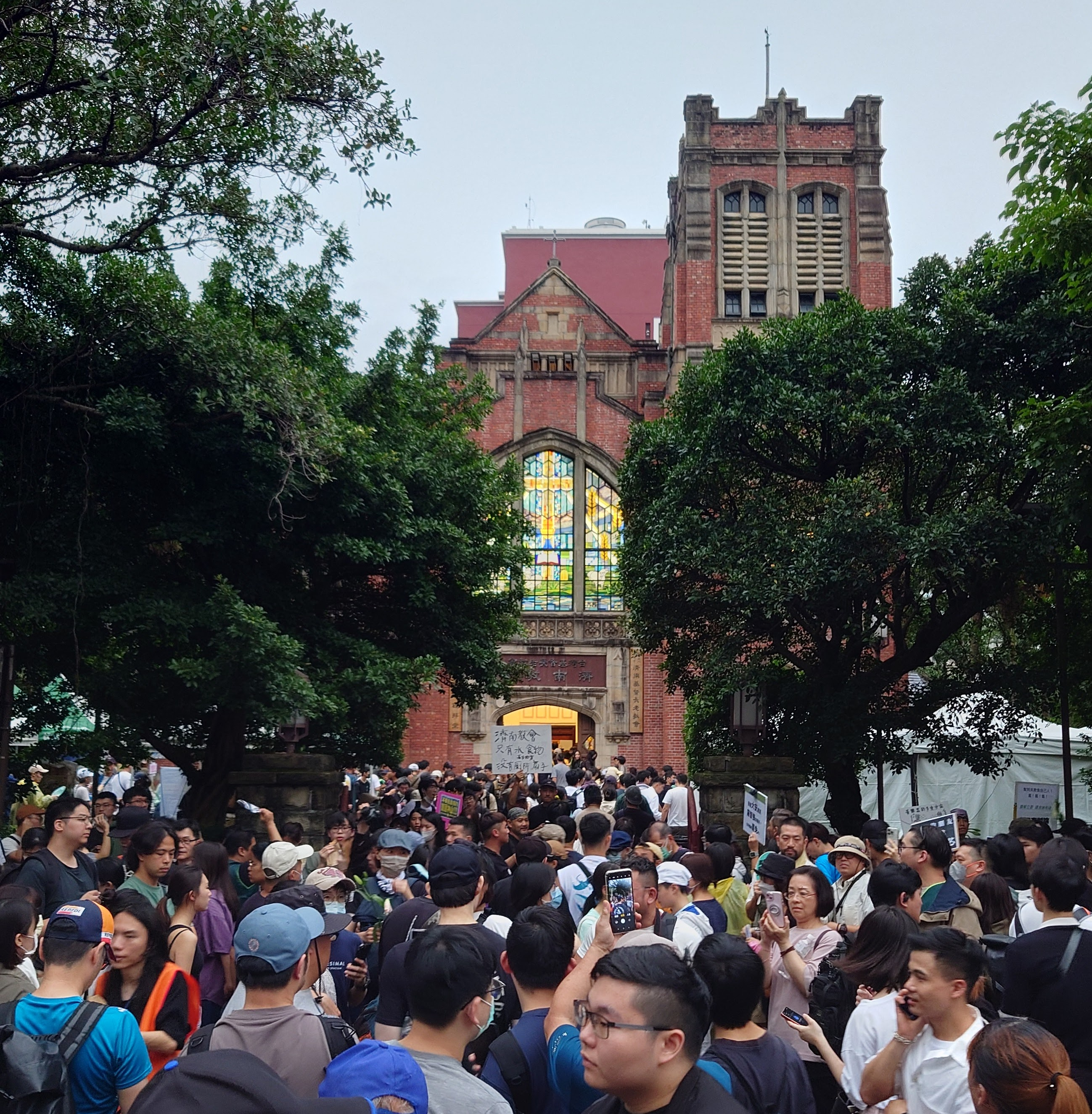
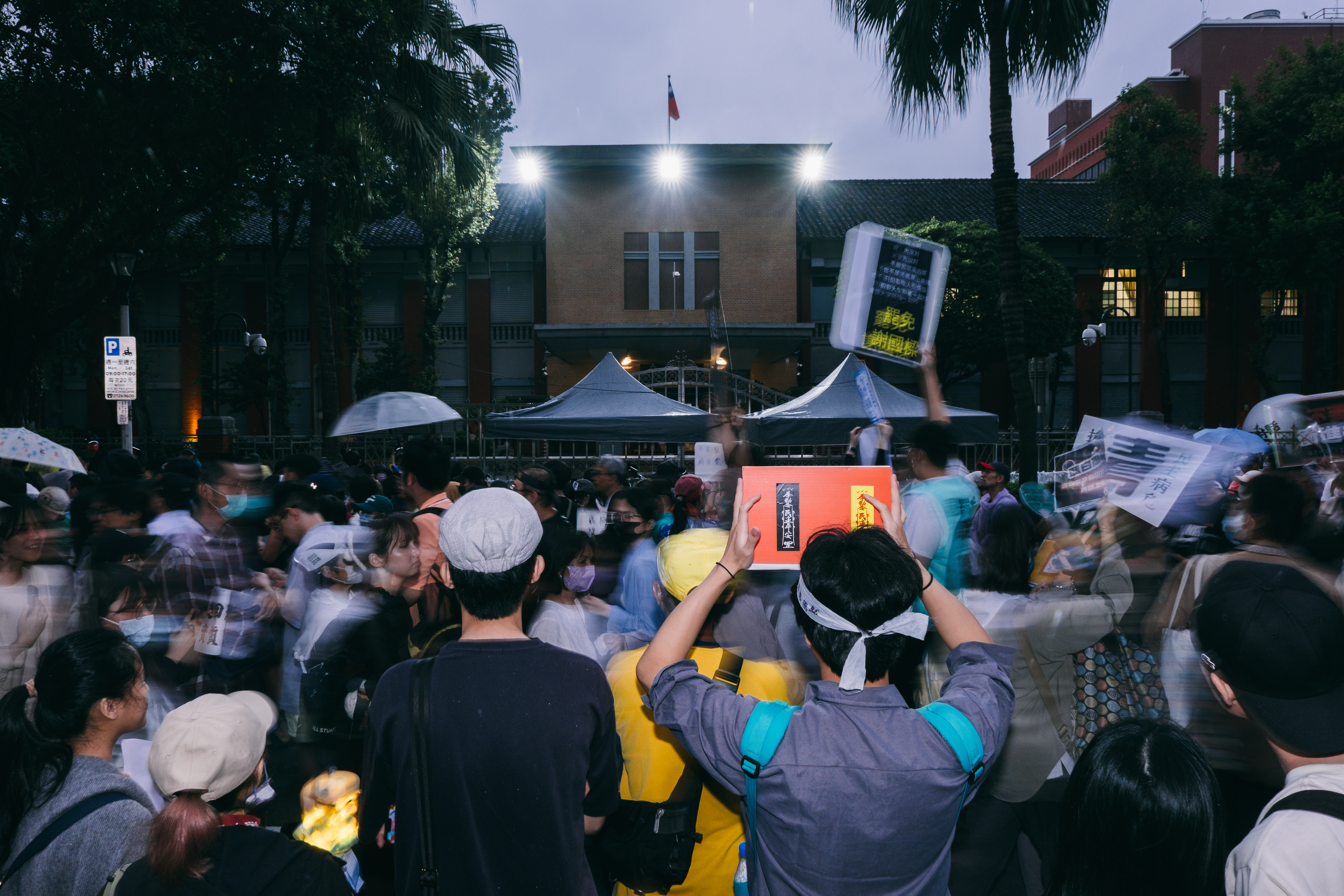
- Mass protests on May 21, 24, and 28 around the Legislative Yuan, from top to bottom.
- Date: 17 May 2024 – 25 October 2024
- Location: Taiwan (Legislative Yuan)
- Caused by: Attempted passage of bills granting greater powers to the Legislative Yuan
- Goals: Revoke bills passed on basis of unconstitutionality; Recall legislators proposing and supporting the bills
- Status: Bill passed on May 28; the Democratic Progressive Party filed a lawsuit for constitutional review; Many provisions of the bills were annulled for breaching the constitution by the Constitutional Court on October 25

Parties
Supported by: Kuomintang (KMT); Taiwan People's Party (TPP)	Protesters; Civic groups; Supported by: Democratic Progressive Party (DPP); Taiwan Statebuilding Party; Taiwan Obasang Political Equality Party; New Power Party; Green Party Taiwan; Social Democratic Party

Number
	tens of thousands of protesters

The 2024 Taiwanese legislative reform controversy started with the proposal and passage of a set of controversial legislative reform bills. It triggered the so-called Bluebird Movement (Chinese: 青鳥行動), a series of protests.

== Background ==
In May 2024, a set of bills was presented as legislature reform that would give lawmakers more power to question government officials and demand documents, including the authority to punish officials who refused to answer questions or hand over records. The proposers, the majority opposition coalition of the Kuomintang (KMT) and Taiwan People's Party (TPP), and supporters of the bill claimed that the amendments were necessary to fight corruption and increase accountability. They also noted that the Democratic Progressive Party (DPP) had supported similar measures when it was the opposition party.

Critics of the bills alleged that they were rammed through without proper legislative review and procedures. The DPP, who now leads a minority government under president and party leader Lai Ching-te, civic groups and some legal experts opposed the bill based on its alleged unconstitutionality, vague definitions, infringements of civil liberties and national security, and apparent targeting of the incoming administration.

== Notable provisions ==
The bills contain fines & imprisonments liability for what the bills termed contempt of the legislature (藐視國會罪). There is no right to legal counsel free from legislative speaker's permission. The bill also allows mandatory summons to anyone to attend legislature hearings, in addition to governmental and public officials, and are subjected to the controversial clauses too. A motion to charge individuals for offenses that are liable for fines requires 6 legislators to propose, which then requires a majority vote of the whole legislature to take effect. Some clauses in these bills are defined vaguely.

In July 2024, KMT and TPP legislators first used the law's new powers to launch a task force investigating the National Communications Commission for approving Mirror TV, alleging that the approval process was subject to inappropriate government influence. The DPP alleged that the probe was improper due to previous investigative efforts, which Mirror Media complained were disproportionate compared to the approval process that other channels had.

=== Constitutional review ===
After the bills passed, the Executive Yuan filed a reconsideration request to the Legislative Yuan on June 6; the Legislative Yuan rejected the request on June 21. After the rejection, the DPP legislative caucus, President Lai, the Executive Yuan, and the Control Yuan filed a joint constitutional review to the Constitutional Court. The Constitutional Court held a preparatory hearing on July 10. The Court later issued a temporary injunction on July 19. A constitutionality hearing was held on August 6.

On October 25, the Constitutional Court annulled the "Contempt of the Legislature" Act and new legislative powers to investigate government officials, preventing probes into Mirror TV case and egg imports from proceeding.

== Timeline ==
From 17 May 2024, protests broke out in Taipei and other places in Taiwan.

A heated and occasionally violent debate took place in the Legislative Yuan as the bill was voted on, which critics allege was completed in a rushed and opaque way. Opposition to the bill was expressed through protests across Taiwan, the largest being at the Legislative Yuan itself with tens of thousands of protesters at the most attended demonstration, making them the biggest series of protests since the Sunflower Student Movement. The protest movement was named the Bluebird Movement, which is orthographically similar to Qingdao East Road where the main protests took place.

=== May 21 ===
Civic groups received permits to assemble near the Legislative Yuan ahead of May 21, giving law enforcement time to redirect traffic. Starting in the morning, over 40 groups gathered on Qingdao East Road despite weather conditions, with the crowd growing to around 30,000 in the evening. Many protestors carried sunflowers and signage that displayed slogans such as "No discussion, no democracy" (沒有討論、沒有民主).

=== May 24 ===
Over 100,000 people gathered to protest the bill.

=== May 28 ===
The bill was passed, and the DPP announced it intended to file a legal challenge on unconstitutionality grounds. Over 70,000 people turned out to protest the passage of the bill as civic groups and students gathered near the legislature and expressed their concerns. In attendance was businessman Robert Tsao, who alleged that Kuomintang legislators were working with the Chinese Communist Party's united front work in Taiwan as protestors called for recalling Han Kuo-yu, Fu Kun-chi, and other Kuomintang legislators. KMT legislators have rejected these accusations, and DPP officials have not offered proof for their allegations.

In Changhua County, students organized a Bluebird Movement rally, which attracted over 1,000 attendees. In Yilan County, two high school students organized a rally in Luodong in support of the Taipei protestors.

=== December 20 ===
DPP lawmakers entered through windows the night before to occupy the Legislative Yuan auditorium and prevent a vote from proceeding, but several bills were nonetheless passed during the day by opposition parties, which had a numerical advantage. Protesters supported by multiple DPP lawmakers clashed with police after one of the Legislative Yuan's gates was broken open.

== Reactions ==
When the bill passed, angry DPP lawmakers threw blue and white (colors associated with the KMT and the TPP respectively) garbage bags at the opposition parties. Researchers pointed out that compared to the Sunflower movement, fewer university students participated in Bluebird because the outcome in 2014 would have affected employment opportunities in Taiwan, whereas the 2024 conflict between the different parties was largely politically driven.

On 20 May 2024, a group of international academics, journalists, former officials (including former American Institute in Taiwan director William A. Stanton) and other critics of the reforms released a joint statement that said the proposed bill granted the Legislative Yuan "excessive power compared with other constitutional democracies and has not been allowed sufficient review by the public or DPP lawmakers."

Overseas Taiwanese in the United States organized a campaign to promote the Bluebird Movement in support of the protestors, raising US$80,050 within three hours to feature a billboard in Times Square in New York City. On 4 June 2024, over 100 Taiwanese gathered in Times Square to support the Bluebird Movement, with the organizers reporting 500 attendees. Students and professionals overseas organized an international petition to protest the abuse of legislative powers, and signers include Taiwanese in the United Kingdom, United States, Japan, France, Sweden, and the Netherlands.

== See also ==
- Sunflower Student Movement
- 11th Legislative Yuan
- Presidency of Lai Ching-te
- 2025 Taiwanese mass electoral recall campaigns
- Divided government
