= Tainan City Council =

Legislature of Tainan City, Taiwan

Coordinates: 22°59′23.9″N 120°11′8.9″E

Tainan City Council 臺南市議會

Type
- Type: Municipal council

History
- Founded: 25 December 2010

Leadership
- Speaker: Qiu Lili since 2022
- Deputy Speaker: Lin Zhizhan since 2022

Structure
- Seats: 57
- Political groups: DPP (28); KMT (12) TSP (1); TSU (1) NPSU (2); Independent (13)

Elections
- Voting system: Single non-transferable vote
- Last election: 2022

Meeting place
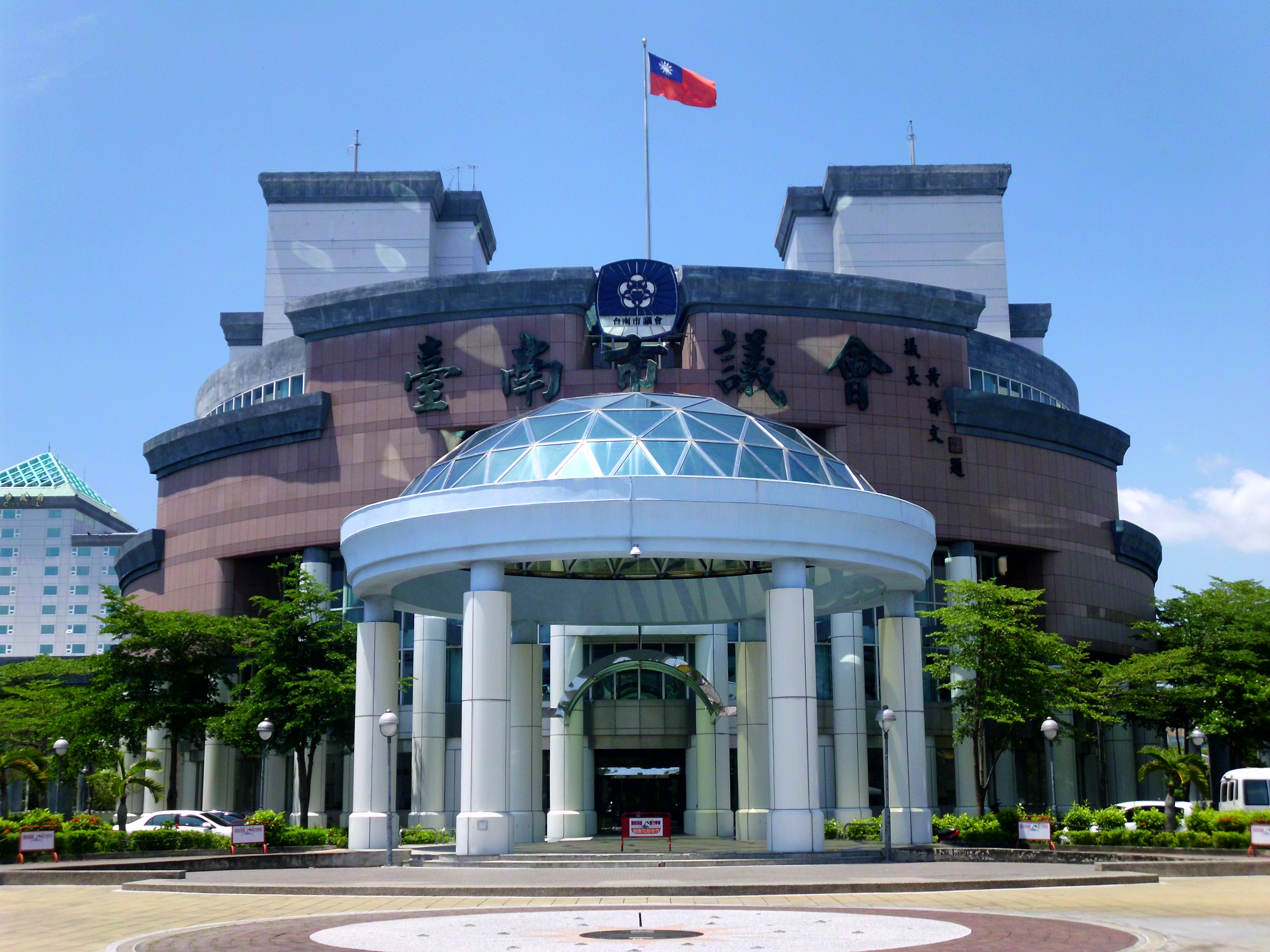
- Building of Tainan City Council; No.2, Yonghua Rd., Sec.2, Anping District; Tainan City, Taiwan

Website
- www.tncc.gov.tw

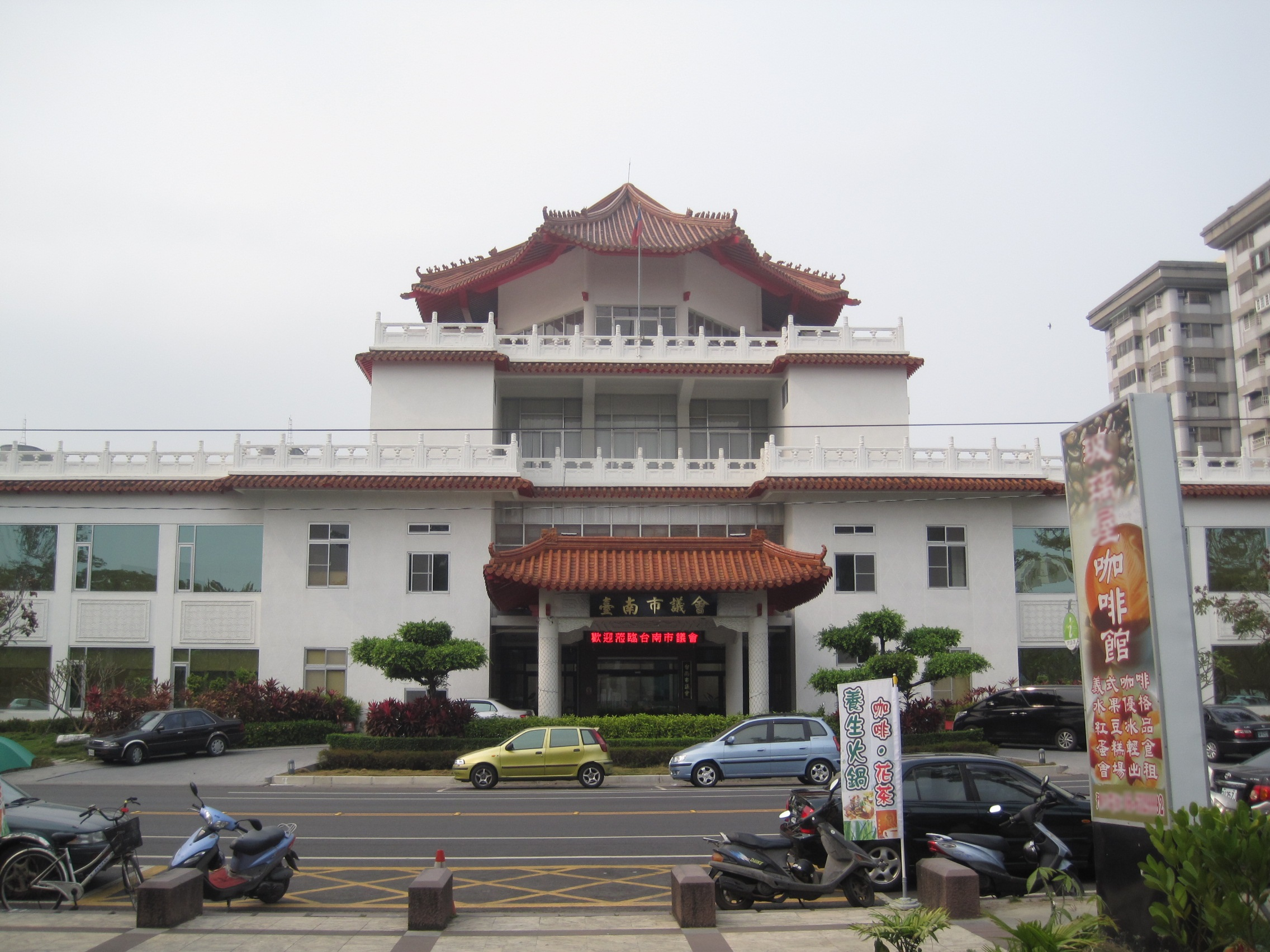
Former Tainan County Council building

The Tainan City Council (TNCC; Chinese: 臺南市議會; pinyin: Táinán Shì Yìhuì) is the elected municipal council of Tainan City, Republic of China that the council is composed of 57 councilors elected from Single non-transferable vote for four-year terms to oversees the Tainan City Government. The Speaker and the Deputy Speaker of the Council are chosen by fellow councilors through anonymous voting. All councilors are directly elected by citizens of the city. Citizen aged 23 or above, who has resided in this city for more than four months.

== Organization ==
- Speaker
- Deputy Speaker
- Secretary-General
- Deputy Secretary-General
- Committees
  - Committee of Civil Affairs
  - Committee of Finance
  - Committee of Education
  - Committee of Construction
  - Committee of Security
  - Committee of Public Works
  - Committee of Discipline

== Speakers ==
- Lai Mei-hui (Democratic Progressive Party) (Dec. 25th, 2010 - Dec. 24th, 2014)
- Lee Chuan-chiao (Kuomintang) (Dec. 25th, 2014 - Aug. 30th, 2016)
- Kuo Hsin-liang (Democratic Progressive Party) (Aug. 30th - Oct. 5th, 2016) (acting)
- Lai Mei-hui (Democratic Progressive Party) (5 October 2016 - Dec. 24th, 2018)
- Kuo Hsin-liang (Independent) (Dec. 25, 2018 -24 December 2022)
- Qiu Li-li (Democratic Progressive Party)25 December 2022-)

== See also ==
- Mayor of Tainan
- Tainan City Government
