= Next Taiwanese legislative election =

- By 2028

All 113 seats to the Legislative Yuan 57 seats needed for a majority
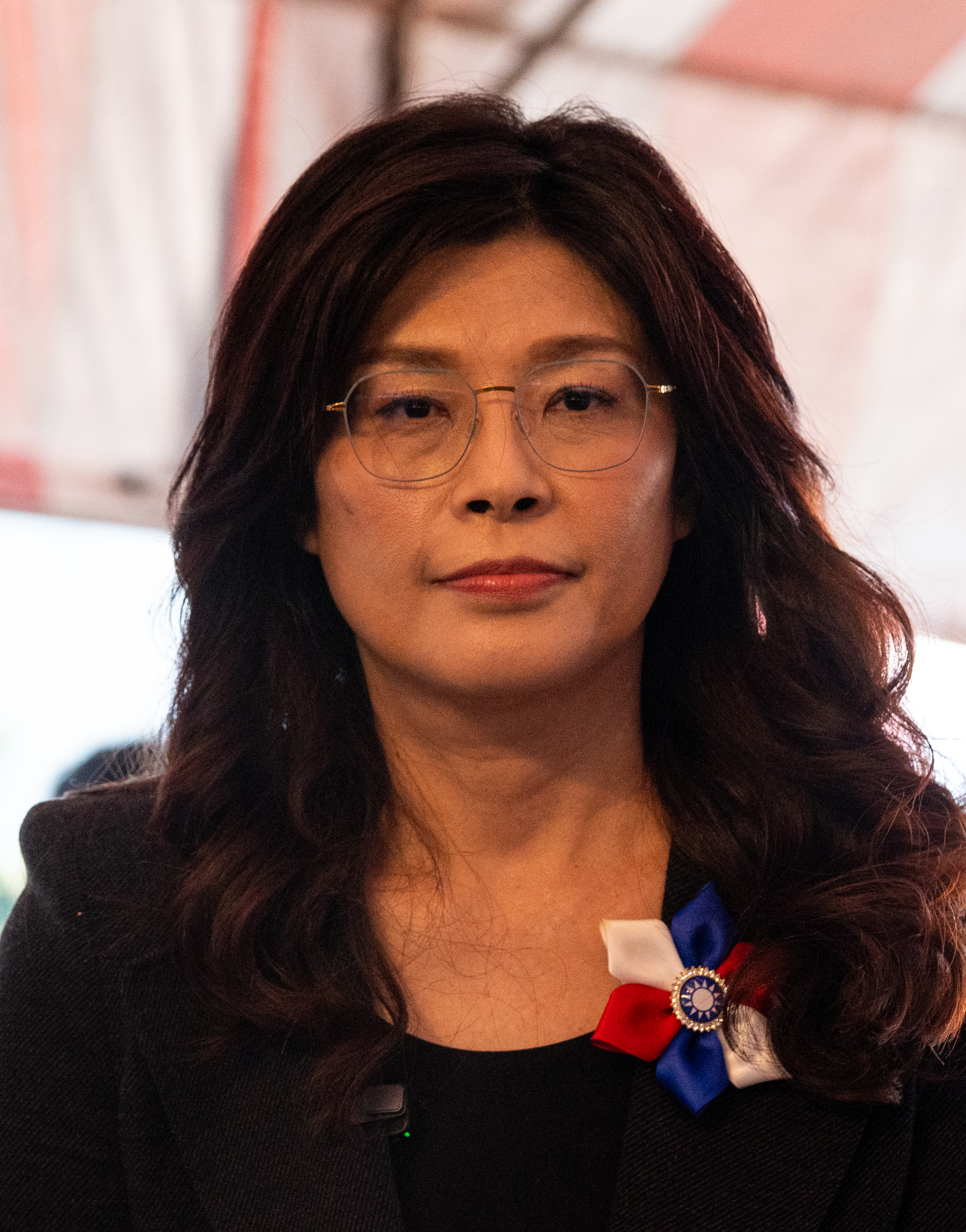

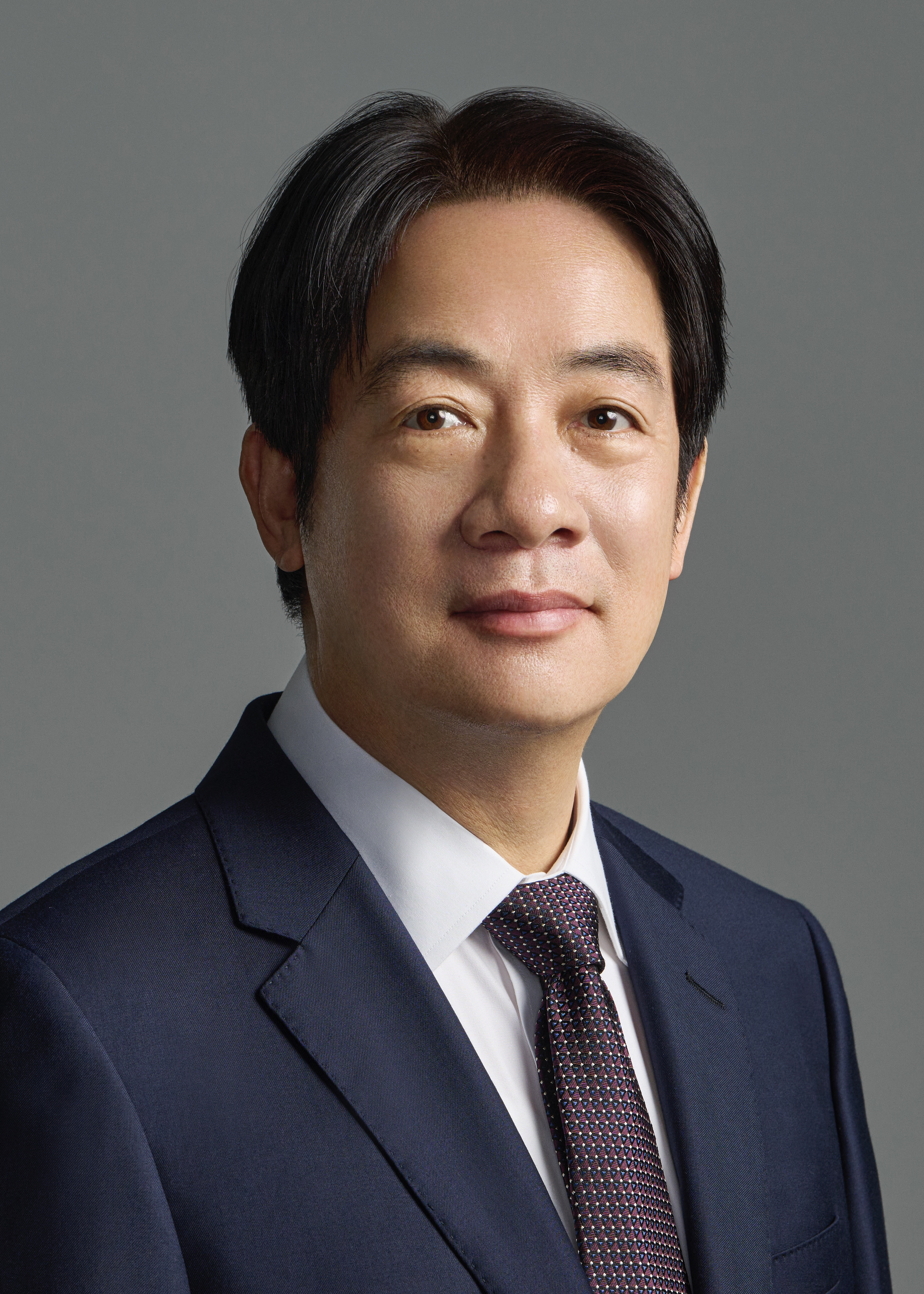

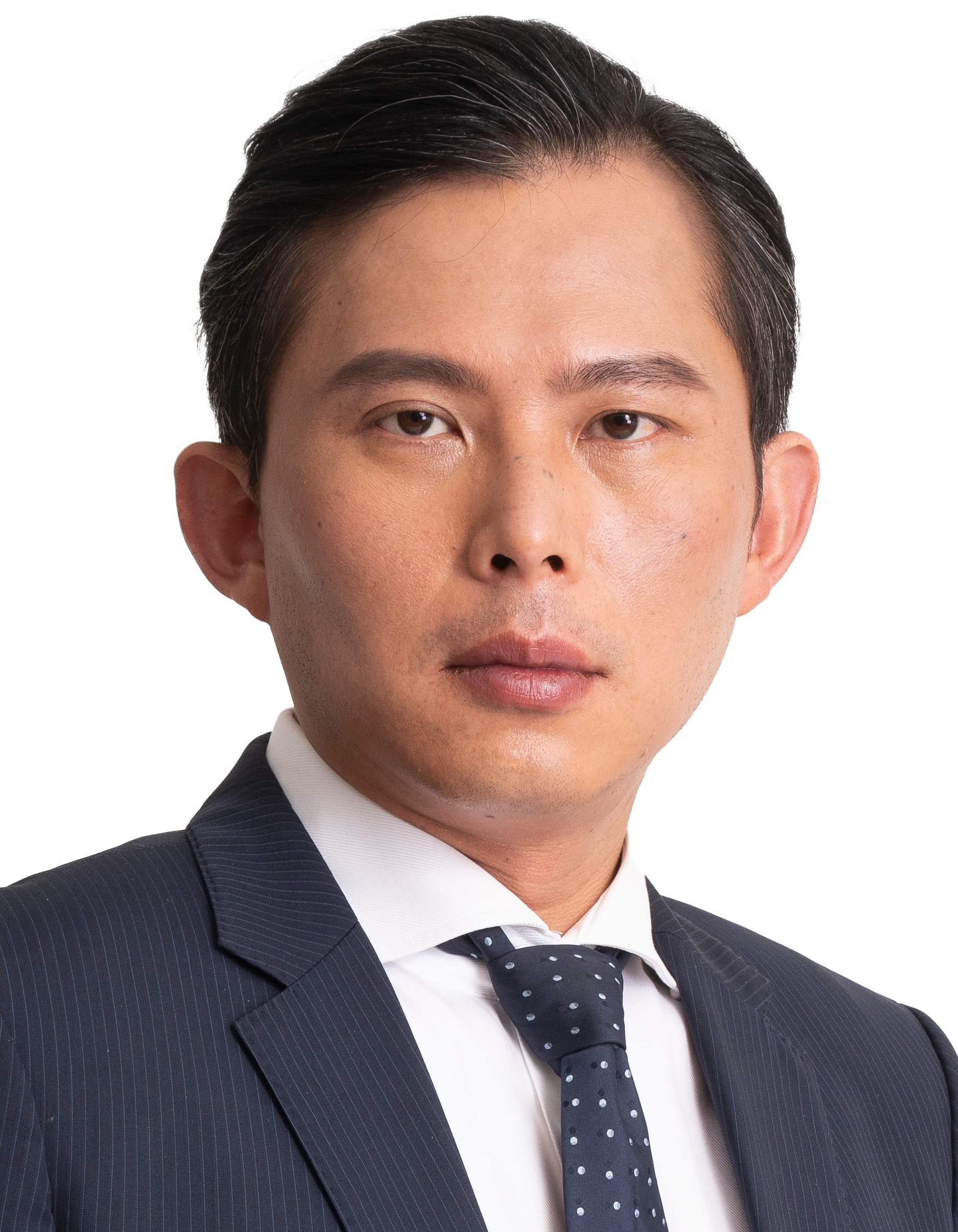
Leader	Cheng Li-wun	Lai Ching-te	Huang Kuo-chang
Party	KMT	DPP	TPP
Leader since	1 November 2025	18 January 2023	1 January 2025
Last election	52 seats, 34.58% (Note: party-list vote share)	51 seats, 36.16%	8 seats, 22.07%
Current seats	52	51	8
Seats needed	▲5	▲6	▲49
Incumbent President of the Legislative Yuan
Han Kuo-yu
KMT

Legislative elections are set to be held in Taiwan by 2028 to renew all 113 seats to the Legislative Yuan.

== Background ==
=== 2024 legislative election ===
The 2024 Taiwanese legislative election saw the incumbent Democratic Progressive Party (DPP) lose the majority they had held since 2016. Despite receiving the most votes, both in the constituency and list votes, the DPP fell to second place with 51 seats, 1 seat behind the Kuomintang (KMT), who received 52 seats. The Taiwan People's Party (TPP), a centre-left party describing itself as a third force between the pan-green camp and pan-blue camp, consolidated the third party vote, increasing its seat share to 8, and placing it in a kingmaker position, meaning its support is crucial in the midst of the hung parliament scenario currently faced, although it has aligned itself with the Kuomintang (KMT), under the KMT–TPP coalition.

== Electoral system ==
The 113 seats of the Legislative Yuan are elected through parallel voting:

- 73 seats are elected through first-past-the-post voting in single member constituencies,
- 6 seats are reserved for Taiwanese aboriginals elected through single non-transferable vote in two 3-member constituencies, Lowland and Highland,
- 34 seats are elected through party-list proportional representation in a single nationwide constituency with a 5% electoral threshold, and 50% of list seats won must be women.

Taiwan's Central Election Commission uses an active household registration system, therefore no citizen has to actively register. Electronic voting is not implemented in Taiwanese elections, nor is absentee voting.

== Opinion polling ==
Date(s) conducted	Pollster	Sample size	DPP	KMT	TPP	Others	None	Don't know/Unsure	Lead
15-17 December 2025	Taiwan Public Opinion Foundation	1,077	38.4%	20.6%	16.7%	1.6%	22.2%	0.4%	16.2
21 October 2025	Taiwan Public Opinion Foundation	1,070	32.9%	21.9%	14.4%	1.7%	27.3%	1.8%	5.6
21 October 2024	Taiwan Public Opinion Foundation	1,077	31.1%	25.3%	12.6%	3.7%	26.6%	0.6%	4.5
September 2024	Taiwan Public Opinion Foundation	Unknown	35.5%	23.2%	12.0%	6.9%	21.3%	1.1%	12.3
19 March 2024	Taiwan Public Opinion Foundation	1,090	31.4%	21.9%	19.2%	3.5%	23.6%	0.4%	7.8
23 January 2024	Taiwan Public Opinion Foundation	1,083	30.5%	25.2%	22.5%	4.9%	16.6%	0.5%	5.3
13 January 2024	2024 legislative election (Note: party-list vote share)	71.79% (Note: Turnout (party-list))	36.16%	34.58%	22.07%	7.19%	-	-	1.58

=== Approval rating ===
Date(s) conducted	Pollster	Sample size	Cho Jung-tai			Lai Ching-te		
Date(s) conducted	Pollster	Sample size	Pos.	Neg.	Net	Pos.	Neg.	Net
December 2025	Taiwan Public Opinion Foundation	?	44.3%	44.3%	0	43.4%	48.6%	–5.2
November 2025	Taiwan Public Opinion Foundation	?	39.7%	46.6%	–6.9	37.9%	50.2%	–12.3
October 2025	Taiwan Public Opinion Foundation	?	36.1%	48.7%	–12.6	34.9%	52.5%	–17.6
September 2025	Taiwan Public Opinion Foundation	?	31.0%	58.2%	–27.2	32.7%	57.8%	–25.1
