= Chang Phen-yu =

Taiwanese politician (born 1958)

- 張芬郁
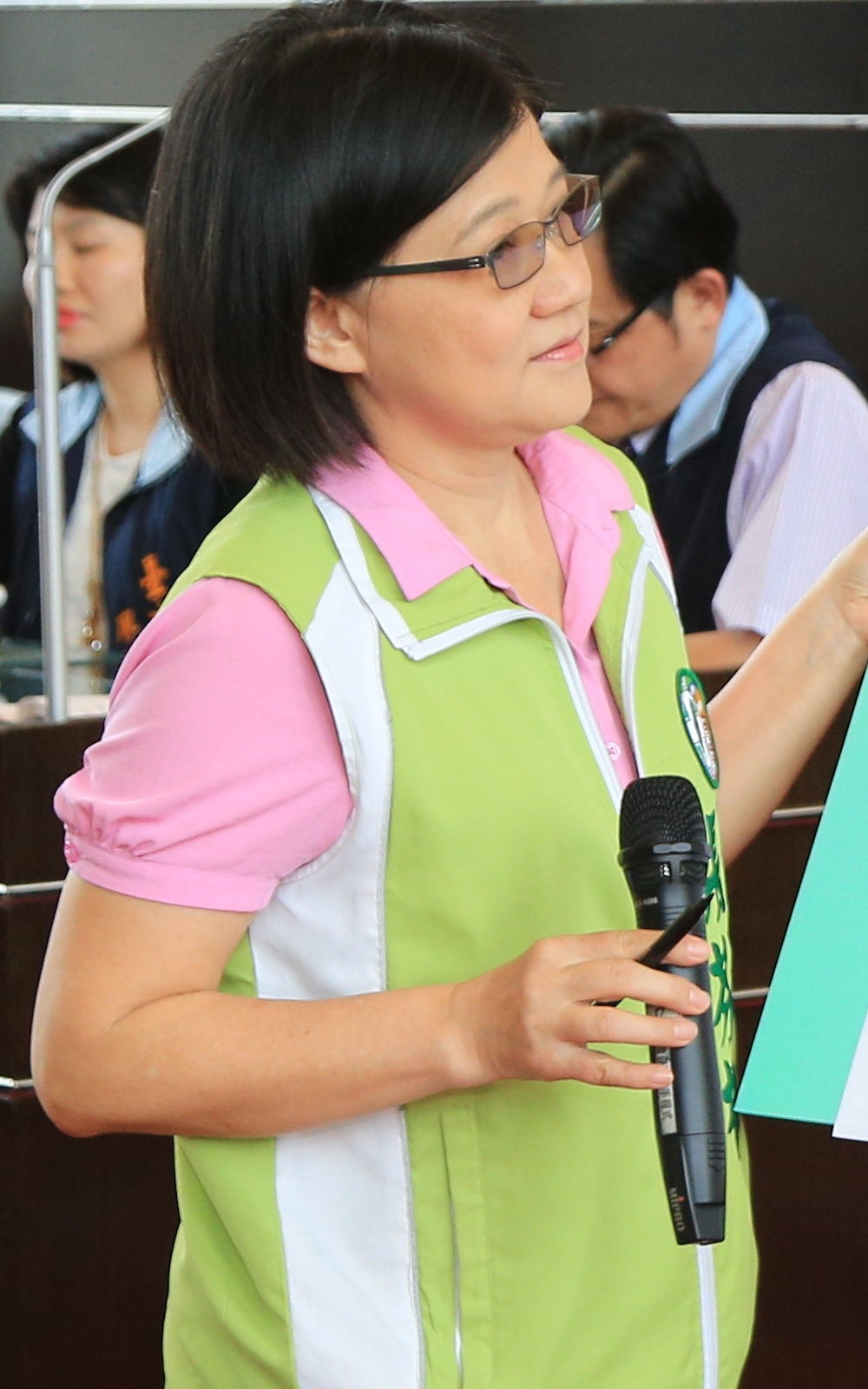
- Photographed in 2015

Taichung City councillor, 2nd and 4th
- Incumbent
- Assumed office 25 December 2022
- In office 25 December 2014 – 24 December 2018
- Constituency: Taichung 13th (Dali, Wufeng)

Personal details
- Born: July 21, 1958 (age 68)
- Party: Democratic Progressive Party
- Spouse: Tony Jian (died 2024)
- Education: National Cheng Kung University (BA); National Chung Hsing University (MA)

Chang Phen-yu (Chinese: 張芬郁; born 21 July 1958）is a Taiwanese politician and a former flight attendant, serving as a councillor in Taichung City. Graduated from National Chung Hsing University and National Cheng Kung University, Chang was married to the former member of the Legislative Yuan Tony Jian, until his death in 2024.

== Biography ==
Chang was born on 21 July 1958. She graduated from Stella Matutina Girls' High School and Taichung Municipal Taichung Girls' Senior High School. After high school, she earned a bachelor's degree in foreign languages and literature from National Cheng Kung University.

After college, Chang worked as a flight attendant at Japan Asia Airways in 1981. She later married Tony Jian, and had served as Director of Human Resources in Bodhi hospital and party representative of Democratic Progressive Party. In 2011, Jian resigned from the legislature after causing a fatal traffic collision, and supported Chang's political career. Chang had served the second councillor in Taichung City. She began studying for a master's degree at National Chung Hsing University in 2015, and earned the degree in June 2018. She failed to get elected as the third councillor in Taichung City. She later got elected as the fourth councillor in 2022. Chang took a leave on 29 November 2024 and later announced Jian's death in the day.
