= Taichung City Constituency 7 =

Constituency of the Legislative Yuan of Taiwan

- Single-member constituency for the Legislative Yuan
- District(s): Taiping, Dali (only 25 villages prior to 2020)
- Electorate: 329,666 (2024 election)

Current constituency
- Created: 2008 (as Taichung County Constituency 3); 2010 (current name); 2020 (current boundaries)
- Party: DPP
- Member: Ho Hsin-chun

Taichung City Constituency 7 (Chinese: 臺中市第七選舉區) is one of the 73 regional constituencies represented in the Legislative Yuan, the national legislature of Taiwan. It was created in 2008 (as Taichung County Constituency 3) following a series of constitutional reforms, and elects one legislator, through first-past-the-post voting, to the Legislative Yuan. It has been represented by Ho Hsin-chun of the Democratic Progressive Party since 2012.

== Legislators ==
Election	Legislator	Party
2008 - 2010	Chiang Lien-fu	Kuomintang
2010 - 2011	Tony Jian	Democratic Progressive Party
2011 - 2012	Vacant	
2012	Ho Hsin-chun	Democratic Progressive Party

== Election results ==

=== 2008 (Note: Named Taichung County Constituency 3, boundaries unchanged) ===
2008 Taiwanese legislative election: Taichung County 3
Candidate	Party	Votes	%
Chiang Lien-fu	Kuomintang	75,563	54.96
Chien Chao-tung	Democratic Progressive Party	61,927	45.04
Total		137,490	100.00
Valid votes		137,490	97.95
Invalid/blank votes		2,871	2.05
Total votes		140,361	100.00
Registered voters/turnout		249,646	56.22
Majority		13,636	9.92
Kuomintang win (new seat)			

=== 2010 (Note: Named Taichung County Constituency 3, boundaries unchanged) ===
2010 Legislative Yuan by-election: Taichung County 3
Candidate	Party	Votes	%	+/–
Tony Jian	Democratic Progressive Party	63,335	55.02	▲9.98
Yu Wen-chin	Kuomintang	51,776	44.98	▼9.98
Total		115,111	100.00	–
Valid votes		115,111	99.15	
Invalid/blank votes		984	0.85	
Total votes		116,095	100.00	
Registered voters/turnout		257,460	45.09	
Majority		11,559	10.04	
Democratic Progressive Party gain from Kuomintang				

=== 2012 ===
2012 Taiwanese legislative election: Taichung 7
Candidate	Party	Votes	%	+/–
Ho Hsin-chun	Democratic Progressive Party	101,006	50.30	▼4.72
Cheng Li-wun	Kuomintang	92,369	46.00	▲1.02
Tuan Wei-yu	People First Party	6,965	3.47	NEW
Kuo Ting-yi	Taiwanism Party	459	0.23	NEW
Total		200,799	100.00	–
Valid votes		200,799	99.14	
Invalid/blank votes		1,750	0.86	
Total votes		202,549	100.00	
Registered voters/turnout		268,042	75.57	
Majority		8,637	4.3	
Democratic Progressive Party hold				

=== 2016 ===
* denotes the incumbent legislator

2016 Taiwanese legislative election: Taichung 7
Candidate	Party	Votes	%	+/–
Ho Hsin-chun	Democratic Progressive Party	119,098	63.07	▲12.77
Lai Yi-huang	Kuomintang	66,181	35.05	▼10.95
Shih Ta-tsai	Military, Civil and Faculty Alliance Party	3,544	1.88	NEW
Total		188,823	100.00	–
Valid votes		188,823	98.36	
Invalid/blank votes		3,147	1.64	
Total votes		191,970	100.00	
Registered voters/turnout		288,794	66.47	
Majority		52,917	28.02	
Democratic Progressive Party hold				

=== 2020 ===
* denotes the incumbent legislator

2020 Taiwanese legislative election: Taichung 7
Candidate	Party	Votes	%	+/–
Ho Hsin-chun*	Democratic Progressive Party	149,538	63.30	▲0.23
Chuang Tzu-fu	Kuomintang	80,000	33.86	▼1.19
Chiang Tsu-chi	Judicial Justice Party	3,336	1.41	NEW
Fu Jo-yi	United Action Alliance	1,883	0.80	NEW
Lin Pei-chi	Taiwan Action Party Alliance	1,480	0.63	NEW
Total		236,237	100.00	–
Valid votes		236,237	98.23	
Invalid/blank votes		4,268	1.77	
Total votes		240,505	100.00	
Registered voters/turnout		319,162	75.36	
Majority		69,538	29.44	
Democratic Progressive Party hold				

=== 2024 ===
* denotes the incumbent legislator

2024 Taiwanese legislative election: Taichung 7
Candidate	Party	Votes	%	+/–
Ho Hsin-chun*	Democratic Progressive Party	132,235	56.58	▼6.72
Lin Chia-hsing	Kuomintang	95,549	40.89	▲7.03
Lin Chen-tung	Judicial Revolution Party	5,911	2.53	NEW
Total		233,695	100.00	–
Valid votes		233,695	97.72	
Invalid/blank votes		5,446	2.28	
Total votes		239,141	100.00	
Registered voters/turnout		329,666	72.54	
Majority		36,686	15.69	
Democratic Progressive Party hold				
