= Ho Hsin-chun =

Taiwanese politician

Ho Hsin-chun MLY
- 何欣純
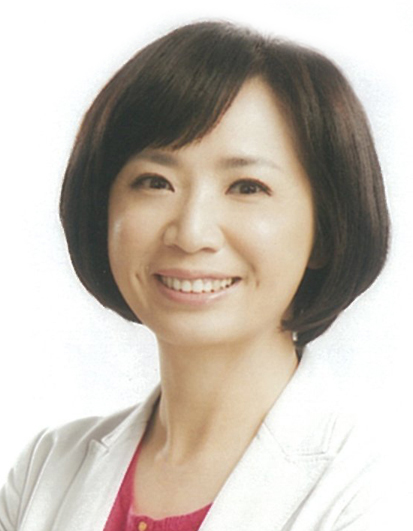

Member of the Legislative Yuan
- Incumbent
- Assumed office 1 February 2012
- Preceded by: Chien Chiao-tung
- Constituency: Taichung 7

Personal details
- Born: 18 December 1973 (age 52) Taichung County, Taiwan
- Party: Democratic Progressive Party
- Relations: Freddy Lim (cousin)
- Education: National Cheng Kung University (BA); University of York (MA)

Ho Hsin-chun (Chinese: 何欣純; pinyin: Hé Xīnchún; Wade–Giles: Ho Hsin-ch'un; born 18 December 1973) is a Taiwanese politician. A member of the Democratic Progressive Party, she has served on the Legislative Yuan since 2012.

== Education ==
After graduating from Taichung Girls' Senior High School, Ho earned her B.A. in history from National Cheng Kung University and a master's degree in women's studies from the University of York in the United Kingdom.

== Political career ==
Ho had served as the Greater Taichung councilor for the DPP. On Thursday September 22, 2011 Hung Yao-fu, the deputy secretary general of the DPP, announced that she was the victor, among five candidates, in a poll for a potential DPP candidate for the seventh district of Greater Taichung. She was to run against Cheng Li-wun, the KMT candidate.

== Personal life ==
Legislator Freddy Lim of the 5th Constituency of Taipei City is also her younger maternal cousin.
