= Holger Chen =

Taiwanese internet personality and mixed martial artist (born 1979)

Chen Chih-han
- 陳之漢
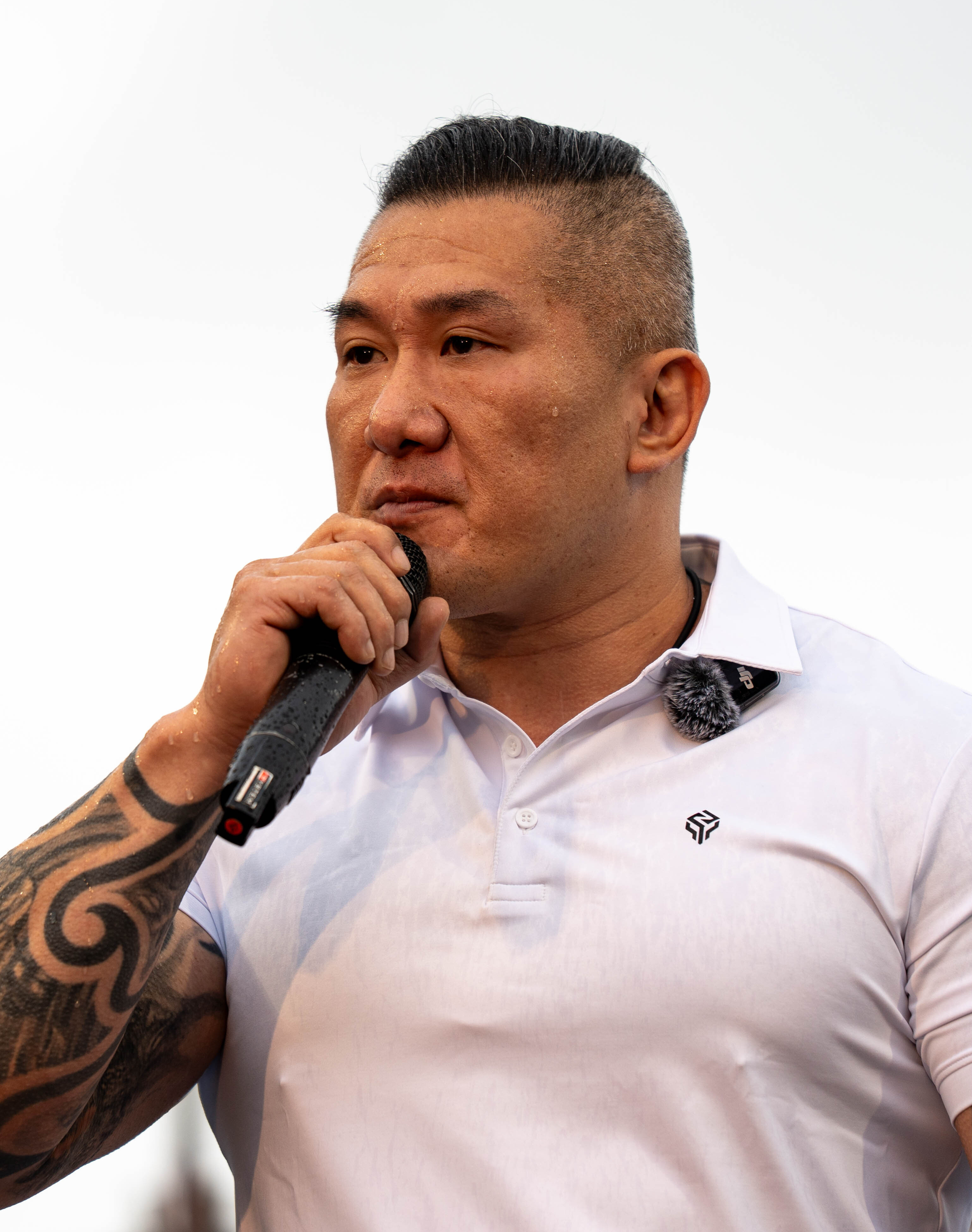
- Chen in 2025
- Born: Chen Szu-han; 12 March 1979 (age 47); Luzhou Township, Taipei County, Taiwan
- Occupations: YouTuber; blogger; entrepreneur; mixed martial artist
- Military career
- Allegiance: (Taiwan) Republic of China
- Branch: ROC Marine Corps
- Service years: 1998–2001
- Rank: Sergeant (中士)

YouTube information
- Channel: 館長成吉思汗
- Years active: 2007–present
- Genres: Comedy; Commentary; Let's Play; Weight training
- Subscribers: 1.08 million
- Views: 246.96 million
- Last updated: 14 July 2022

Chen Chih-han (Chinese: 陳之漢; pinyin: Chén Zhīhàn; born 12 March 1979), also known by his English name Holger Chen, is a Taiwanese internet personality, mixed martial artist and bodybuilder. He is also known popularly by the nickname Kuan Chang (Chinese: 館長; pinyin: Guǎnzhǎng; lit. 'gym manager') in Taiwan, being the founder and CEO of G. K. Fitness Club (Chinese: 成吉思汗健身俱樂部; lit. 'Genghis Khan Fitness Club').

== Early life ==
Chen was born in 1979 and moved frequently during his childhood before his family settled in Luzhou, then part of Taipei County. His father came from an affluent family, but his mother was not his father's wife, and his paternal relatives had cut ties with his family. His father frequently traveled between Taiwan and the United States but rarely visited. His father died during Chen's childhood, leaving his mother to raise him and his older sister. His mother supported the family by working at a dance hall.

Chen was raised in poverty and experienced bullying and physical abuse from other children during his school years. During junior high school, he played on his school's basketball team and began weight training to develop his physique. At age 15, he began working at construction sites, performing jobs that included painting and formwork installation. He worked during the day and attended evening classes throughout his high school years because of his family's financial difficulties. His education included attendance at Zhiren Supplementary School (志仁補校), a continuing education institution in Taipei.

At age 19, Chen enlisted in the Republic of China Marine Corps. Seeking to supplement his family's income, he signed a voluntary military service contract and became a non-commissioned officer. He served in the 66th Marine Brigade, initially as a corporal and squad leader before becoming a sergeant and deputy platoon leader. His responsibilities included serving as an instructor in mountain training, amphibious operations training, and combat techniques. Chen left the military after approximately three and a half years, reportedly because he was dissatisfied with what he considered unfair disciplinary treatment within his unit. Following his discharge, he held several jobs, including working as a porter and deliveryman.

== Business and martial arts ==
In 2014, Chen opened his first fitness center, G.K. Fitness Club. It was one of the first gyms in Taiwan to popularize and offer mixed martial arts training to the public. He now leads six fitness centers in New Taipei City and Taoyuan City.

On 17 December 2023, it was revealed Chen has taken up Brazilian jiu-jitsu when he competed in a tournament in Okinawa hosted by the Asian Sport Jiu Jitsu Federation (ASJJF) as an ultra heavyweight white belt and won gold in the white belt gi competition and bronze in no-gi.

On 11 January 2025, he competed in a Brazilian jiu-jitsu tournament in Taipei again as a white belt, showing that he has taken an active role in promoting the sport in Taiwan.

== Political activism ==
As an internet celebrity and blogger, he often expresses his opinions on current affairs and politics through live streaming and social media platforms.

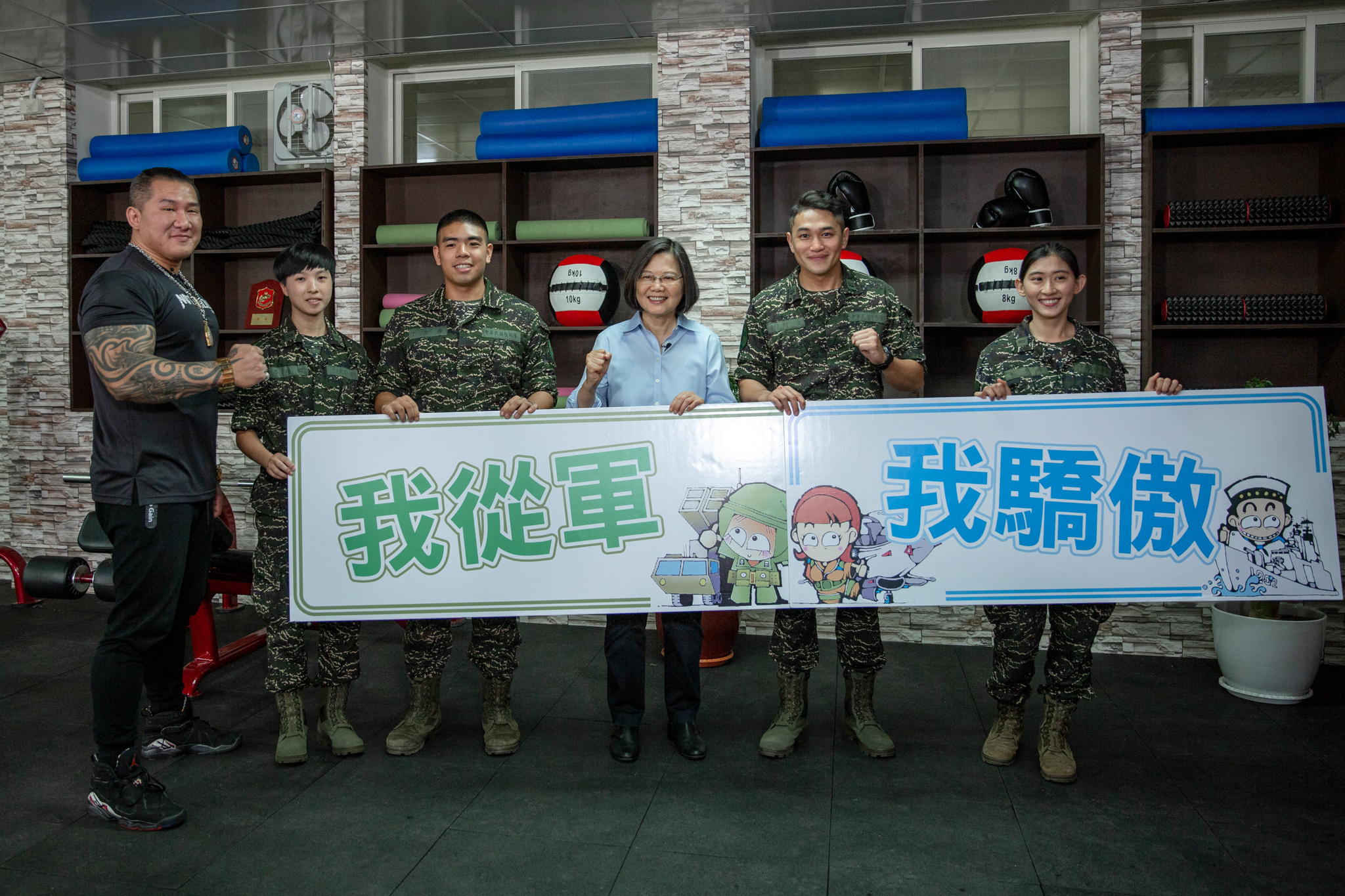
Chen (far left), posing with President Tsai Ing-wen in 2019

In 2019, Chen and New Power Party legislator Huang Kuo-chang organized a protest in Taipei against pro-China media such as CTV, CTi TV and China Times, all owned by the Want Want Holdings Limited. The rally was attended by tens of thousands of people.

In June 2025, Chen took a six-day trip with ten other Taiwanese people to Shanghai, intending to give Taiwanese audiences an "unfiltered" view of mainland Chinese society. The group visited locations such as shopping malls, high-speed rail, and other sites characteristic of modernity in China. Chen compared Taipei negatively to Shanghai, and claimed that his view of the mainland had previously been clouded by Democratic Progressive Party (DPP) propaganda, although he said that his visit was motivated by curiosity rather than ideology. Beijing's Taiwan Affairs Office applauded the visit, while Taiwan's Mainland Affairs Council reminded Chen to observe Taiwanese and Chinese laws during the trip. However, some Chinese netizens responded negatively to Chen's on-stream assertion that he was from "the Republic of China". During this trip, he was announced as a founding member of the "Opposition Alliance", a party founded by former Kuomintang legislator Cheng Li-wun intended to "revive the spirit" of the Tangwai movement and combat the DPP's "Green Terror".

== Personal life ==
Chen is married, and he has a son and a stepdaughter from his wife's previous marriage. Chen has a pet Caucasian Shepherd dog named Ta-hsiung and a few cats, including most notably, a Maine Coon named Rich, which often appears on his YouTube livestreams. Chen regularly trains and is titled a specialist in Muay Thai, Sanda, and kickboxing. He more recently trains Brazilian jiu-jitsu, which as of 2025, he is a white belt.

=== Assassination attempt (2020) ===
On 28 August 2020 at 2 a.m., Chen was shot three times by an unknown assailant at his New Taipei City gym. According to witnesses, bullets hit his right arm, thigh and ankle. Despite the pain caused by the bullets, Chen managed to host a live stream on Facebook regarding the incident. He said, "I was shot twice. I hope that if I die this time, please everyone carry on my spirit, you must carry on my spirit. Please everyone take care of my wife and child, I beg everyone. Also, my mother, I beg everyone. Argh, my right thigh was hit." Chen was then escorted to a nearby hospital. According to local media, a man known by his surname "Liu" turned himself in to the police. It was believed that he encountered Chen several times and allegedly sexually harassed him.
