= Chenglong Wetlands =

Wetland in Kouhu, Yunlin, Taiwan

- 成龍溼地 (Chinese)
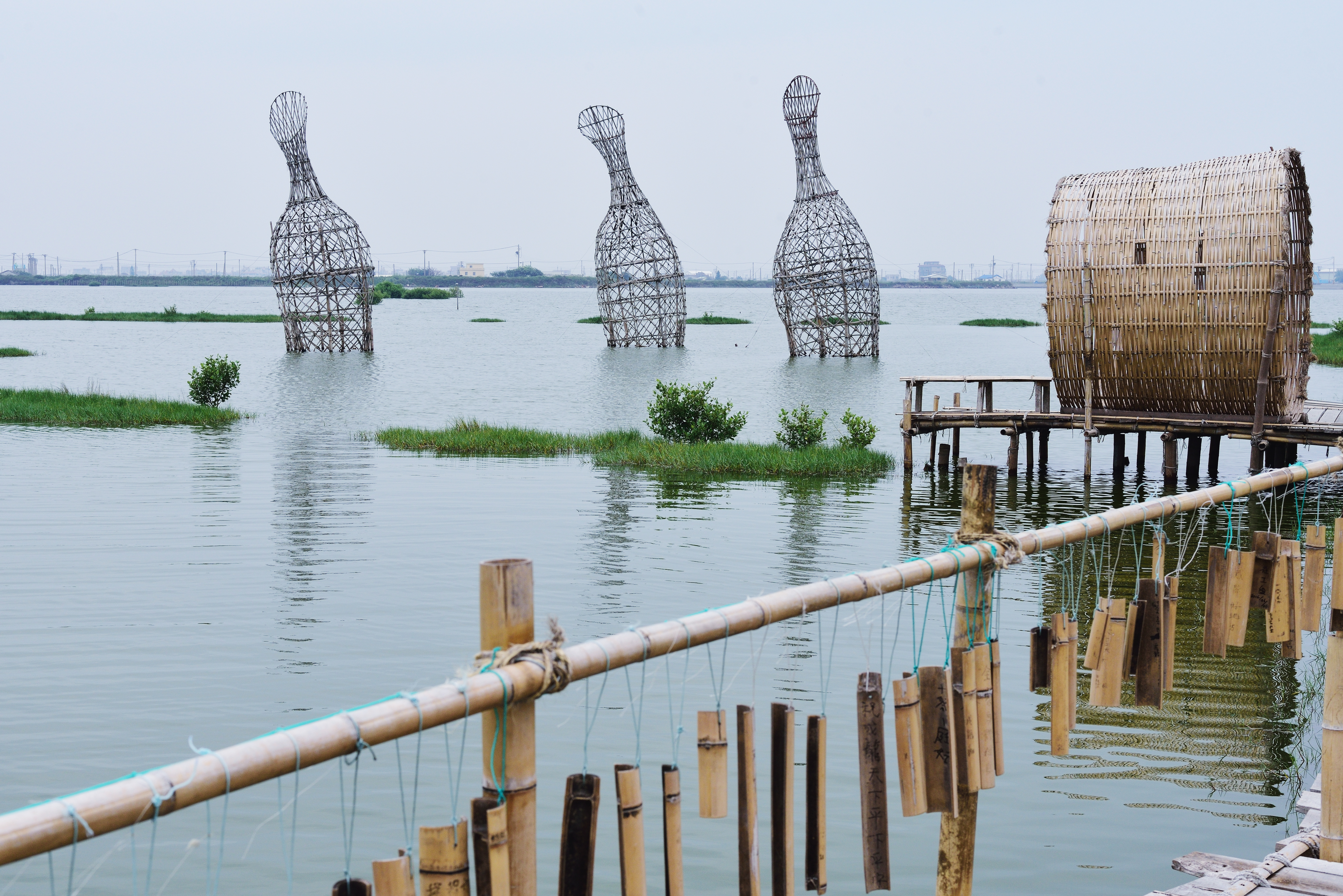

- Location within Yunlin County
- Location: Kouhu, Yunlin County, Taiwan
- Coordinates: 23°33′22.2″N 120°9′51.9″E
- Type: wetland
- Surface area: 171 ha (420 acres)

Chenglong Wetlands (traditional Chinese: 成龍溼地; simplified Chinese: 成龙湿地; pinyin: Chénglóng Shīdì) is a wetland in Kouhu Township, Yunlin County, Taiwan.

== History ==
The wetland was formed due to the low altitude of the lower Hukou Village of Kouhu Township and the overuse of groundwater over the years. Those factors contributed to the land subsidence of the area which make it prone to flooding. More sea water encroachment is also brought by the frequent typhoons happening in Taiwan, which eventually turned the area into a wetland.

== Geology ==
The wetland spans over an area of 171 hectares.

== See also ==
- List of tourist attractions in Taiwan
