= 2025 Kuomintang chairmanship election =

- 18 October 2025
- Turnout: 39.46% (▼11.25%)
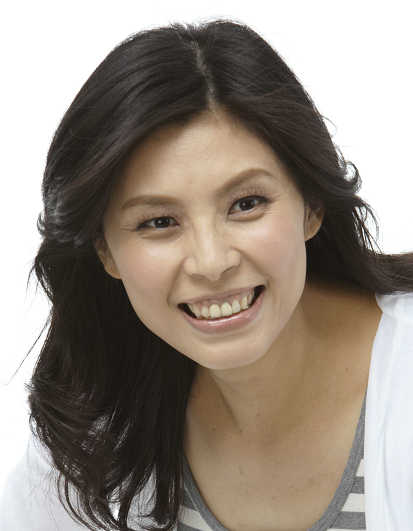

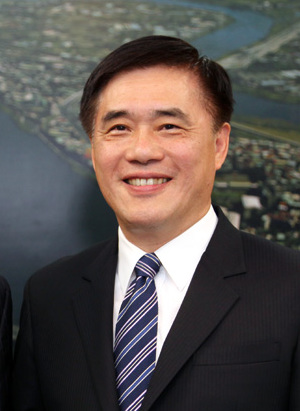

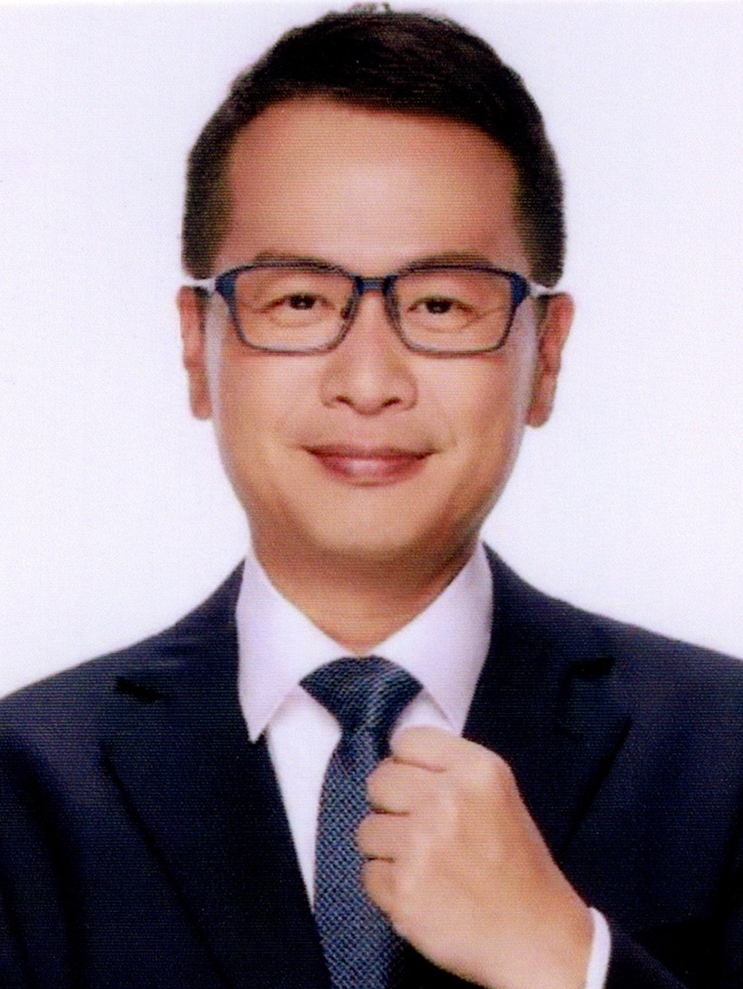

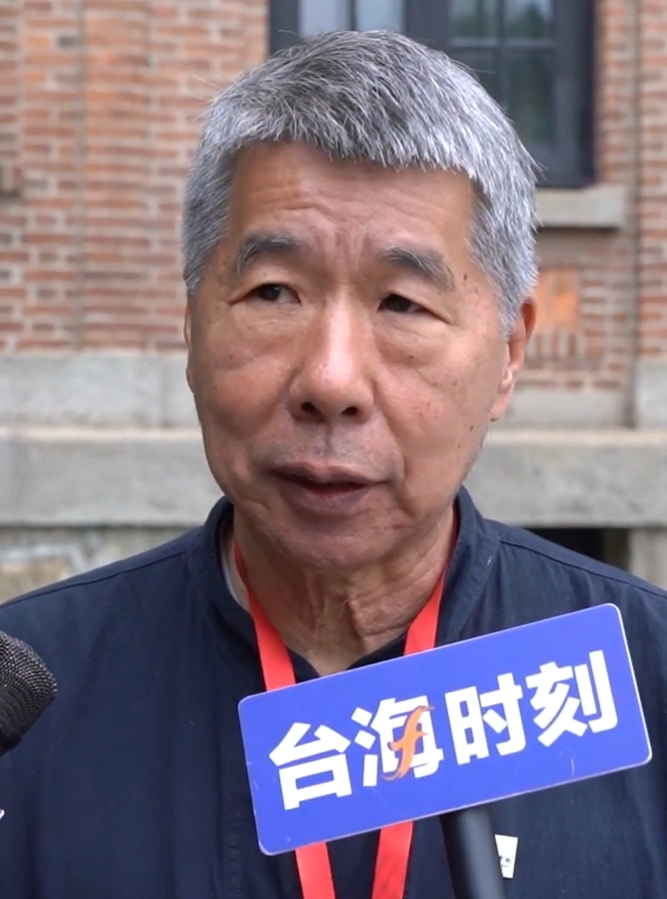

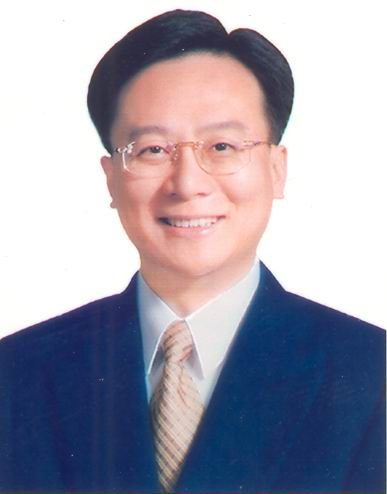
Nominee	Cheng Li-wun	Hau Lung-pin	Lo Chih-chiang
Popular vote	65,122	46,551	13,504
Percentage	50.15%	35.85%	10.40%
Nominee	Chang Ya-chung	Cho Po-yuan	Tsai Chih-hung
Popular vote	2,486	1,944	260
Percentage	1.91%	1.50%	0.20%
Chairman before election
Eric Chu
Elected Chairman
Cheng Li-wun

The 2025 Kuomintang chairmanship election (Chinese: 2025年中國國民黨主席選舉) was held on 18 October 2025. It was the eleventh direct election of the party leader in Kuomintang (KMT) history. All registered, due-paying KMT party members were eligible to vote.

== Candidates ==
By January 2025, Sun Chien-ping, a member of the Kuomintang's Central Standing Committee and convenor of the White Civil Justice League, which counterprotested the Sunflower Student Movement, had declared his candidacy. Cho Po-yuan announced his candidacy on 16 April 2025. Chang Ya-chung entered the election on 22 May 2025. After both rounds of the 2025 Taiwanese recall votes passed without any Kuomintang member of the Legislative Yuan losing their seat, incumbent party leader Eric Chu confirmed that he would not seek reelection and called for Taichung mayor Lu Shiow-yen to run. In response, Lu stated she had no plans to contest the party leadership. Instead, she was focused on mayoral responsibilities, particularly reducing the effect of American tariffs on businesses in Taichung. Lo Chih-chiang announced his candidacy for the party leadership on 25 August 2025. Lo stated that, if he were elected chairman, he would support Lu's candidacy in the 2028 presidential election, then step down as chair if she were confirmed as the KMT nominee within three months of the 2026 local elections. Lo confirmed on 7 September that he had received permission to run in the election, although he had not yet served on the Kuomintang's Central Committee or the Central Advisory Committee, stating that outgoing chair Chu would appoint him to a position on the Central Advisory Committee. On 9 September, Hau Lung-pin stated that either he or Jaw Shaw-kong would contest the leadership election.

== Scheduling delays and candidate registration ==
The chairmanship election was scheduled for 18 October 2025, with candidate registration originally planned on 4 and 5 September, then later expanded to 1 through 5 September. On 27 August, the Central Standing Committee approved Cheng Cheng-chien's resolution to postpone candidate registration to 15 through 19 September.

On 18 September 2025, Lo Chih-chiang, Cheng Li-wun, and Cho Po-yuan completed the registration of their candidacies, with Lo and Cheng paying an administrative fee of NT$3 million, alongside a deposit of NT$10 million. Hau Lung-pin acquired registration forms on the same day. Hau, Chang Ya-chung, and former National Assembly member Tsai Chih-hung formally registered their candidacies on 19 September.

== Debates ==
The first party leadership debate was hosted by Chung T'ien Television (CTi) on 20 September 2025. Hau Lung-pin was invited, but could not attend. Cho Po-yuan protested as the debate was being held, because he had not been invited. Chang Ya-chung, Cheng Li-wun, and Lo Chih-chiang shared their views on Cross-strait relations. Both Cheng and Lo backed the 1992 Consensus, with Cheng promising to "crush" any support of the Taiwan independence movement and uphold the Constitution of the Republic of China. Lo stated, "I am Taiwanese and Chinese. My China is the Republic of China." Chang pledged to reinstate the Guidelines for National Unification if he were elected Kuomintang chair. At the second chairmanship debate, hosted by CTi on 27 September, five of six candidates discussed the party's candidate selection process for the 2028 presidential election. Cho Po-yuan was again absent and protested his lack of invitation. The United Daily News and TVBS News co-hosted the third party leadership debate on 2 October. All six candidates took part and again discussed cross-strait relations. On 11 October, CTi hosted a fourth party leadership debate, for which Cho was not present. Tsai asked the other party leadership candidates if they were willing to meet Chinese Communist Party officials after their election, and all four expressed their openness to the idea.

During the fourth debate, Hau also commented on the use of artificial intelligence in the election. Two days previously, he had claimed on Facebook that "foreign forces" and "fellow party members" had been disseminating AI-generated misinformation about him online. Although Hau did not name specific countries, Jaw Shaw-kong identified China as the source of the interference in comments supportive of Hau. Prior to the fourth debate and revelation of AI-related concerns, Jamestown Foundation president Peter Mattis wrote about the Kuomintang's preference for closer ties with China. After he had brought up the AI-related issues, Hau himself continued to support a cross-strait policy calling on China to apply "no force as long as Taiwan does not declare independence". The deputy director of Tunghai University's Center for Mainland China and Regional Development Research, Hung Pu-chao, observed that the situation marked an expansion of Chinese efforts to influence Taiwanese political systems. On 15 October, the National Security Bureau confirmed that approximately 1,000 video clips about the Kuomintang leadership election were posted to Douyin, and 200 videos about the election were present on YouTube, with roughly a dozen of the actively tracked YouTube accounts not Taiwanese in origin. Citing the imminence of the election date, Director-General Tsai Ming-yen declined to confirm that the posts were specifically from China or discuss which candidate the majority of videos supported.

== Results ==
The Kuomintang originally determined that 331,410 party members were eligible to vote, and opened a total of 383 polling stations across Taiwan from 8:00 to 16:00. The eligible electorate was later revised to 331,145. Cheng Li-wun was elected the second chairwoman in party history, following Hung Hsiu-chu in 2016. A total of 130,678 votes were cast, for a turnout of 39.46 percent. This marked the lowest turnout for a full-term Kuomintang leadership election, still better than the 2020 by-election turnout of 35.85 percent. Cheng won 65,122 votes (50.15 percent), followed by Hau Lung-pin at 46,551 votes (35.85 percent). Lo Chih-chiang finished third with 10.4 percent, followed by Chang Ya-chung with 1.91 percent of the vote, then Cho Po-yuan at 1.5 percent. Tsai Chih-hung placed sixth with 0.2 percent of the vote. On 1 November 2025, Cheng assumed leadership of the Kuomintang, as part of the party's 22nd National Congress.

Results of the 2025 Kuomintang chairmanship election
No.	Candidate	Votes	%
1	Chang Ya-chung	2,486	1.91%
2	Tsai Chih-hung	260	0.20%
3	Lo Chih-chiang	13,504	10.40%
4	Hau Lung-pin	46,551	35.85%
5	Cheng Li-wun	65,122	50.15%
6	Cho Po-yuan	1,944	1.50%
Eligible voters		331,145	
Total votes		136,780	
Valid votes		129,867	
Invalid votes		811	
Turnout		39.46%	

== Reactions ==
Xi Jinping, speaking in his capacity as General Secretary of the Chinese Communist Party, congratulated Cheng Li-wun on her election to the leadership of the Kuomintang. His statement acknowledged the Kuomintang and Chinese Communist Party's "common political foundation, upholding the 1992 consensus and opposition to Taiwanese independence to promote cross-strait exchanges and cooperation, and strive to maintain peace and stability in the Taiwan Strait" and furthermore indicated that "The great rejuvenation of the Chinese nation is unstoppable, and it is hoped the two parties will uphold their shared political foundation, unite the broader Taiwanese community, strengthen the pride, integrity and confidence of being Chinese, deepen exchanges and cooperation, and advance national unification".

Cheng replied by saying that under the basis of the 1992 consensus, the two sides achieved "historic milestones" in regards to promoting peaceful development across the Taiwan Strait. She also said both sides, which she called "descendants of the Yan and Yellow emperors", should strengthen cooperation, maintain stability, and "open a grand new chapter for the rejuvenation of the Chinese nation". In a subsequent interview, Cheng stated, "As long as it addresses cross-strait conflicts and disagreements, promotes peace and cooperation, and brings about common prosperity, I am willing to take on all responsibilities and meet anyone." Huang Kuo-chang, chairman of the Taiwan People's Party, called Cheng directly to offer his party's congratulations, and expressed hope that a unity government could be established as part of the KMT–TPP coalition.
