= Ariel Chang =

Taiwanese politician (born 1980)

Ariel Chang / Naglim Tiunn MLY
- 張雅琳
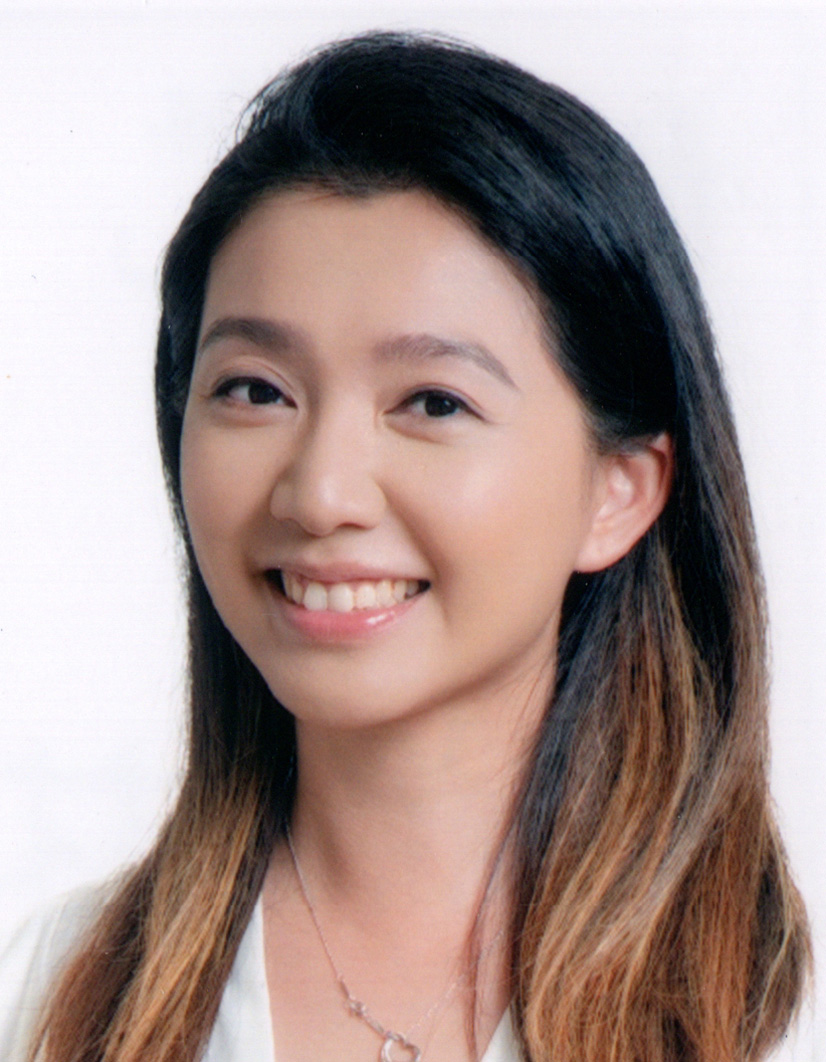

Member of the Legislative Yuan
- Incumbent
- Assumed office 1 February 2024
- Constituency: National At-Large

Personal details
- Born: 29 August 1980 (age 46) Taipei County, Taiwan
- Party: Democratic Progressive Party
- Education: National Taiwan Ocean University (BA); Ulster University (MA)

Chinese name
- Traditional Chinese: 張雅琳
Transcriptions
Standard Mandarin
- Hanyu Pinyin: Zhāng Yǎlín
- Bopomofo: ㄓㄤ ㄧㄚˇˋㄌㄧㄣˊ
- Wade–Giles: Zhang1 Ya3 lin2
Southern Min
- Hokkien POJ: Tiuⁿ Ngá-lîm

Ariel Chang (Chinese: 張雅琳; born 29 August 1980), also known as Ngalim Tiunn, is a Taiwanese children's rights activist and politician.

== Early life and education ==
Chang was born on 29 August 1980 in Taipei County (now New Taipei City), Taiwan. Her family was of Hoklo Chinese descent, with ancestral ties to Houlong in Miaoli County, where Chang was raised. Despite her family being of Hoklo background, both her maternal and paternal uncles spoke Hakka Chinese.

Chang graduated from National Taiwan Ocean University with a bachelor's degree in shipping and transportation management, in 2002. She then earned a master's degree in communication studies and public relations from Ulster University in the United Kingdom.

== Career ==
Chang worked in public relations for Sanofi, Acuvue, and Mondelez International, and later headed the organization Taiwan Parks and Playgrounds for Children by Children. She was ranked third on the Democratic Progressive Party list for proportional representation. While formally registering her candidacy for the 2024 legislative election, Chang expressed hope that the government would consider children's' needs in the policymaking process.
