= Cheng Li-wun =

Taiwanese politician and lawyer (born 1969)

- 鄭麗文
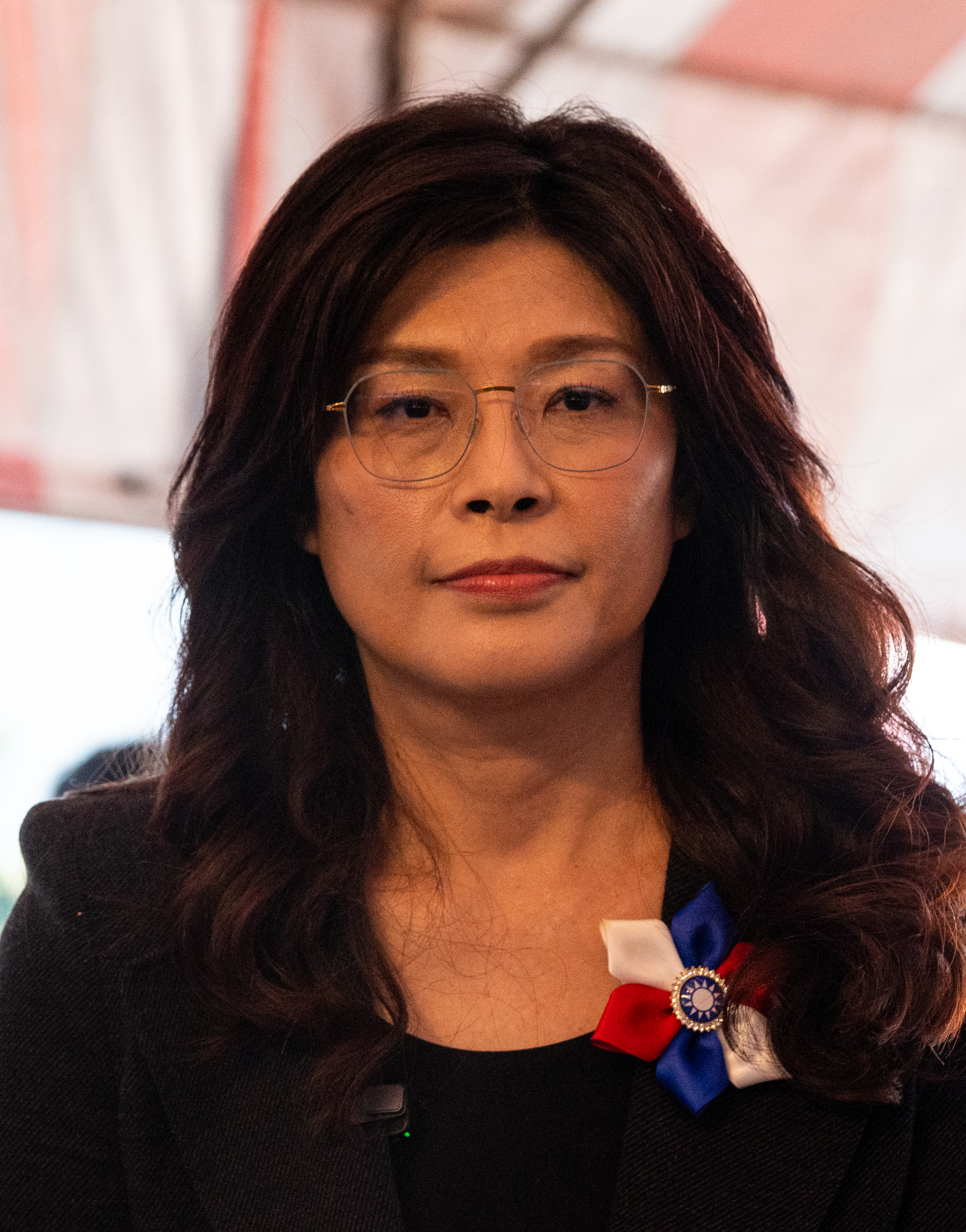
- Cheng in 2025

12th Chair of the Kuomintang
- Incumbent
- Assumed office 1 November 2025
- Vice Chairman: Lee Chien-lung; Chi Lin-lien; Hsiao Hsu-tsen; Chang Jung-kung
- Preceded by: Eric Chu
- Chairwoman: Herself
- Preceded by: Lin Kuan-yu

2nd Spokesperson of the Executive Yuan
- In office 23 October 2012 – 17 February 2014
- Prime Minister: Sean Chen; Jiang Yi-huah
- Preceded by: Huang Min-kung (a.i.)
- Succeeded by: Sun Lih-chyun

Member of the Legislative Yuan
- In office 1 February 2020 – 1 February 2024
- Constituency: Party-list
- In office 1 February 2008 – 31 January 2012
- Constituency: National At-Large

Member of the National Assembly
- Mission based 30 May 2005 – 7 June 7, 2005
- Constituency: Nationwide and Overseas
- In office 20 May 1996 – 19 May 2000
- Constituency: Taipei I

Personal details
- Born: November 12, 1969 (age 56) Kouhu, Yunlin, Taiwan
- Party: Democratic Progressive Party (1988–2002); Independent (2002–2005); Kuomintang (since 2005)
- Spouse: Luo Wu-chang (m. 2011)
- Education: National Taiwan University (LLB); Temple University (LLM); University of Cambridge (MSc)

Chinese name
- Traditional Chinese: 鄭麗文
- Simplified Chinese: 郑丽文
Transcriptions
Standard Mandarin
- Hanyu Pinyin: Zhèng Lìwén

Cheng Li-wun (Chinese: 鄭麗文; pinyin: Zhèng Lìwén; born 12 November 1969) is a Taiwanese politician and lawyer who has served as Chair of the Kuomintang since 2025. She is the second woman to lead the Kuomintang (KMT), after Hung Hsiu-chu.

After graduating from National Taiwan University, Cheng studied international relations as a doctoral student at the University of Cambridge. She represented Taipei in the National Assembly from 1996 to 2000 as a member of the Democratic Progressive Party (DPP). After leaving the party in 2002, she joined the KMT in 2005 and returned to the National Assembly that year. She was elected to the Legislative Yuan in 2008 and served as the spokesperson of the Executive Yuan under premiers Sean Chen and Jiang Yi-huah. She returned to the legislature in 2020 for a second term.

In 2025, Cheng was elected KMT chair in that year's chairmanship election, campaigning on opposition unity and improved cross-strait relations. In April 2026, she visited mainland China and met with Chinese leader Xi Jinping in Beijing. She subsequently visited the United States and oversaw preparations for the 2026 Taiwanese local elections, including electoral cooperation with the Taiwan People's Party (TPP).

== Early life and education ==
Cheng was born on 12 November 1969 in Yunlin County, Taiwan. Her mother was a Taiwanese native of Kouhu Township, where the family lived for a time in a dormitory owned by the Taiwan Sugar Corporation. Her father, Cheng Ching-hui (鄭清輝), was a Yi soldier from Zhenyuan County in Pu'er, Yunnan, China, who served in the Chinese Expeditionary Force during the Second Sino-Japanese War and moved to Taiwan during the retreat of the government of the Republic of China to Taiwan. Her maternal grandfather, a close friend of writer Cheng Feng-hsi, worked as an irrigator.

As a child, Cheng was raised in a military dependents' village in Tainan. After graduating from Taipei Municipal Zhongshan Girls High School in 1987, she studied law at National Taiwan University and graduated with her Bachelor of Laws in 1991. As an undergraduate, she joined the University Forum Society (大學論壇社), a student organization involved in political activism, and worked as a proofreader for Freedom Era Weekly (自由時代週刊), a publication founded by democracy activist Cheng Nan-jung, in 1988. She also became involved in the Taiwan independence movement and, after becoming the president of the Forum Society, participated in the Wild Lily student movement.

Cheng then studied law in the United States at Temple University and earned a Master of Laws (LL.M.) in international law from its Beasley School of Law in 1993. She completed further graduate studies in England, earning a Master of Science (M.Sc.) in international relations in 2000 from the University of Cambridge, where she was also a doctoral Ph.D. candidate in international relations. As a graduate student at Cambridge, Cheng studied under Dutch sinologist Hans van de Ven and intended to begin an academic career as a historian.

== National Assembly member ==
=== First term (1996–2000) ===
Cheng was elected to the Third National Assembly as a member of the Democratic Progressive Party (DPP) in 1996. She contested Taipei City's First Electoral District, receiving 58,234 votes, or 12.75 percent of the vote. During the 1997 constitutional amendment negotiations, she was a member of the DPP National Assembly caucus's constitutional amendment working group, alongside representatives Lee Wen-chung and Chung Chia-pin. In 1999, she became the deputy convener of the DPP caucus in the National Assembly. She served as deputy director of the DPP's Department of Youth in 2000.

=== Party departure ===
After the DPP came to power under Chen Shui-bian in the 2000 presidential election, Cheng became an outspoken critic of the party. In October 2002, Cheng publicly criticized Twu Shiing-jer, the acting director-general of the Department of Health, in television call-in programs after he was wrongly accused of involvement in a sexual scandal. Twu was subsequently vindicated after People First Party legislator Diane Lee and restaurant proprietor Cheng Ko-jung acknowledged having mistaken another person for him.

The DPP's Taipei City branch executive committee recommended Cheng's expulsion from the party, citing her criticism of Twu and the damage to the party's reputation. Cheng protested the decision by submitting a petition to the party's Taipei City branch and holding a protest at National Taiwan University. Former DPP chairman Hsu Hsin-liang criticized the committee's proposed expulsion of Cheng. Conversely, DPP legislator Lee Wen-chung defended the disciplinary proceedings. The DPP suspended Cheng's membership following the controversy, after which she decided to leave the party.

=== Second term (2005) ===
In 2005, Cheng joined the Kuomintang (KMT) at the invitation of party chairman Lien Chan. She was included among the 147 candidates registered by the KMT for the 2005 National Assembly election. The election was conducted under a nationwide party-list proportional representation system to elect a 300-member National Assembly tasked with voting on proposed constitutional amendments. The KMT received 1,508,384 votes, or 38.92 percent of the national total, winning 117 of the Assembly's 300 seats. Cheng was among the KMT candidates elected to the Assembly.

== Legislative Yuan ==
=== First term (2008–2012) ===
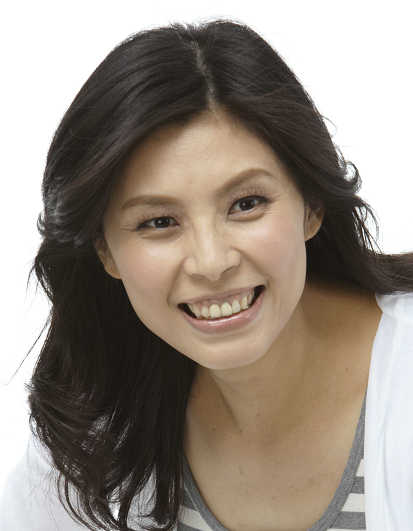
Official portrait, 2011

Cheng was elected to the 7th Legislative Yuan in the 2008 Taiwanese legislative election as a party-list representative of the KMT. During her term, she served on the Foreign Affairs and National Defense Committee for the first two legislative sessions and the Social Welfare and Environmental Hygiene Committee for the remaining six sessions, while also serving intermittently on the Procedure Committee.

In January 2010, Cheng organized a legislative public hearing on a draft anti-discrimination law prepared by her office that sought to prohibit discrimination on grounds including race, ethnicity, nationality, religion, disability, sex, and sexual orientation. The proposed legislation also called for the establishment of a Cabinet-level commission responsible for human rights protection and equality. Representatives of civil society organizations expressed support for the legislation's objectives while questioning its enforceability and provisions excluding certain government institutions from its scope. In July 2011, Cheng suggested that Taiwan consider legislation similar to a partnership law to establish legal rights and obligations for same-sex couples living together.

In the 2012 Taiwanese legislative election, Cheng contested a constituency seat in Taichung but lost to the DPP's Ho Hsin-chun.

=== Second term (2020–2024) ===
Cheng returned to the Legislative Yuan after the 2020 Taiwanese legislative election, having been placed fifth on the KMT's national party list. She assumed office as a member of the 10th Legislative Yuan on 1 February 2020. During her second term, she served on the Judiciary and Organic Laws and Statutes Committee, the Internal Administration Committee, and the Education and Culture Committee, as well as the Procedure Committee and Constitutional Amendment Committee.

During the seventh and eighth sessions of the 10th Legislative Yuan, Cheng served on the Education and Culture Committee. In April 2023, she questioned education officials about the growing discrepancy between reported and officially confirmed cases of school bullying, asking whether excessively strict criteria had prevented incidents from being substantiated. In September 2023, she was selected as one of the committee's two conveners alongside DPP legislator Fan Yun. In November, Cheng presided over an Education and Culture Committee meeting examining the Ministry of Culture's proposed budget for 2024 and budgets associated with national cultural institutions. Her second term in the Legislative Yuan ended on 31 January 2024.

== Spokesperson of the Executive Yuan ==
Cheng as spokesperson of the Executive Yuan in 2013

On 20 October 2012, Premier Sean Chen appointed Cheng as spokesperson of the Executive Yuan. She was selected for her familiarity with the media and her ability to explain government policies in an accessible way. Cheng assumed office on 23 October, replacing acting spokesperson Huang Min-kung (黃敏恭). She retained her position following Jiang Yi-huah's appointment as premier in February 2013.

On 7 February 2014, the Executive Yuan announced that Jiang had accepted Cheng's resignation as spokesperson. The government named Sun Lih-chyun, then vice chairman of the Fair Trade Commission, as her successor. Cheng stated that she had submitted her resignation the previous day and described her forthcoming work in television broadcasting as a professional challenge that interested her. She subsequently joined TVBS, where she hosted the political commentary program Li-wun's Strait Talk (麗文正經話) beginning in 2014.

== Tangwai Grand Opposition Alliance ==
On 11 June 2025, Cheng established the Tangwai Grand Opposition Alliance (黨外在野大聯盟), bringing together politicians, academics, and public figures opposed to the ruling Democratic Progressive Party (DPP). Its founding supporters included former legislator Kuo Cheng-liang, Ma Ying-jeou Foundation executive director Hsiao Hsu-tsen, internet personality Holger Chen, Taipei First Girls High School teacher Alice Ou, Academia Sinica member Chen Pei-jer and others. The launch also drew legislators from the Kuomintang and Taiwan People's Party, as well as independent legislator Kao Chin Su-mei. Cheng invoked the historical Tangwai movement as a model for bringing voices outside the ruling party together to provide political checks and balances. She emphasized that the alliance's purpose extended beyond opposing the 2025 Taiwanese mass electoral recall campaigns, envisioning cooperation among opposition groups over the following three to five years to defend democracy and strengthen scrutiny of the government. Attending the launch, former Broadcasting Corporation of China chairman Jaw Shaw-kong similarly described resistance to the recalls as the alliance's first campaign within a broader effort to strengthen government oversight.

== Chair of the Kuomintang ==
=== Chairperson election (2025) ===
On 11 August 2025, Cheng expressed interest in contesting the KMT chairmanship during an interview on Wang Chien-chiu's radio program, stating that she would seriously consider running if Taichung mayor Lu Shiow-yen declined to enter the race. She linked her potential candidacy to the concerns about Taiwan's political direction that had prompted her to establish the Tangwai Grand Opposition Alliance, saying that she felt a responsibility to act if she received support. After Lu announced that she would not run, Cheng reaffirmed her candidacy and called for the party leadership to be determined through an open election, arguing that disputes over previous presidential nominations had weakened party unity.

On 18 September, Cheng formally registered at the KMT's central headquarters, presenting her candidacy as a commitment to defending the Republic of China and its constitution and calling for a fair contest without predetermined outcomes or preferential treatment. She also pledged to serve as a full-time chair and strengthen coordination among the party headquarters, its legislators and local governments.

On 18 October 2025, Cheng was elected chair of the Kuomintang (KMT), receiving 65,122 votes, or 50.15 percent, in the 2025 Kuomintang chairmanship election. She defeated five other candidates, including former Taipei mayor Hau Lung-pin. She became the second woman to lead the party, following Hung Hsiu-chu, who held the position from 2016 to 2017. Her election followed allegations of Chinese interference in the leadership contest, including accusations by former legislator Jaw Shaw-kong that online videos attacking Hau and supporting Cheng were part of a coordinated campaign. Cheng rejected the allegations and criticized efforts to associate her campaign with Chinese influence.

Cheng succeeded Eric Chu at the KMT's 22nd National Congress on 1 November 2025, pledging to defend democracy, revive Taiwan's economy, and pursue long-term peace across the Taiwan Strait. Her new leadership team included Lee Chien-lung as vice chair and secretary-general, alongside vice chairs Chi Lin-lien, Hsiao Hsu-tsen, and Chang Jung-kung. She identified winning the 2026 Taiwanese local elections and returning the KMT to national power in the 2028 presidential election as central objectives of her leadership.

=== 2026 visit to mainland China ===
On 30 March 2026, Cheng accepted an invitation from Xi Jinping to lead a KMT delegation to mainland China. During the six-day visit from 7 to 12 April, Cheng traveled to Nanjing, Shanghai, and Beijing, meeting Chinese officials and visiting cultural and commercial institutions. At a welcoming banquet hosted by Song Tao, director of the Taiwan Affairs Office, Cheng reaffirmed the KMT's adherence to the 1992 Consensus and opposition to Taiwan independence.

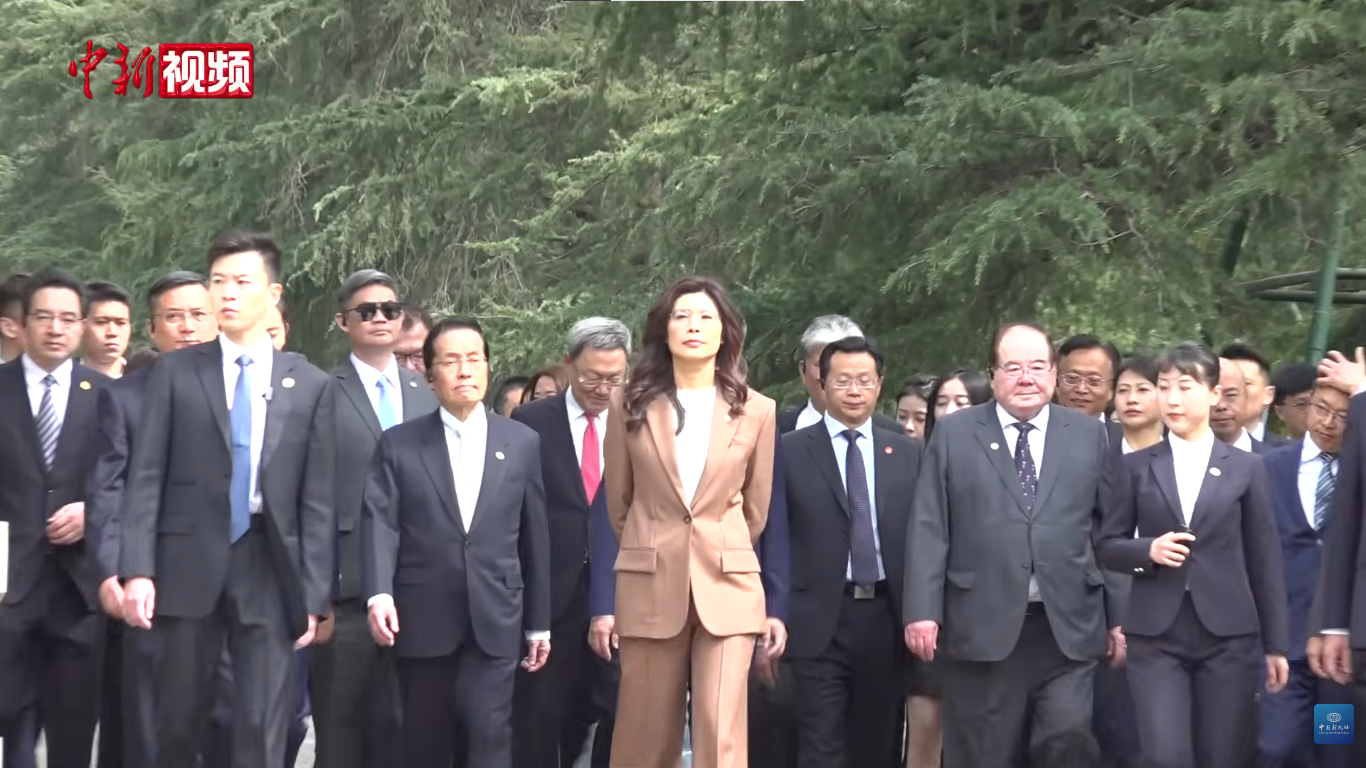
Cheng visiting the Sun Yat-sen Mausoleum in Nanjing on 8 April 2026

On 10 April, Cheng met Xi at the Great Hall of the People in Beijing, marking the first meeting between the leaders of the KMT and CCP in approximately a decade. During their public remarks, both leaders reaffirmed the 1992 Consensus and opposition to Taiwan independence, while Cheng called for the creation of an institutionalized mechanism for dialogue between the two parties. Xi called for the KMT and CCP to advance Chinese unification and national rejuvenation, and said that Beijing would not tolerate Taiwanese independence. The meeting drew criticism from the administration of President Lai Ching-te, which criticized the Chinese government for attempting to use party-to-party exchanges to advance its claim that Taiwan is part of China.

=== 2026 visit to the United States ===
On 1 June 2026, Cheng departed Taiwan for a two-week visit to the United States, following her meeting with Xi Jinping in April. She stated that the visit was intended to correct American misconceptions about the KMT's approach to cross-strait relations and expressed willingness to meet President Donald Trump. During meetings in Washington, Cheng discussed Taiwan's defense, military procurement, and cross-strait relations with American legislators, including Senator Dan Sullivan and Representatives Don Bacon and Young Kim. According to the Liberty Times, some U.S. security agencies monitored Cheng's contacts, as several Chinese hometown association leaders with alleged surveillance links to China were present during her events.

At a press conference on 12 June, Cheng said she had met nine members of the United States Congress and several policy experts, arguing that the meetings had helped clarify the KMT's position toward Beijing. Responding to concerns in Washington over the KMT's opposition to parts of the government's military spending proposals, Cheng maintained that supporting dialogue with China did not mean abandoning Taiwan's defensive capabilities or democratic system. A scheduled meeting with officials of the United States National Security Council was cancelled, prompting scrutiny of the visit's diplomatic arrangements. Cheng returned to Taiwan on 16 June, having completed the visit without meeting Trump.

=== Domestic politics and 2026 local elections ===
Cheng at a White Terror memorial ceremony in Taipei in November 2025

Under Cheng's leadership, the KMT continued its cooperation with the Taiwan People's Party (TPP), led by Huang Kuo-chang, in preparation for the 2026 local elections. On 14 March 2026, Cheng and Huang announced a common policy platform addressing social welfare, housing affordability, environmental sustainability, and artificial intelligence governance. Both parties agreed to establish a joint coordination group comprising three representatives from each party to negotiate electoral cooperation and candidate selection. In April, a joint opinion poll conducted to select the opposition candidate for mayor of New Taipei City resulted in the nomination of KMT politician Lee Shu-chuan over Huang.

In June 2026, Cheng announced plans for a referendum on restarting nuclear power generation and reversing Taiwan's policy of being nuclear-free. On 28 August, the Central Election Commission approved the KMT-backed nuclear energy referendum for a nationwide vote on 28 November, coinciding with the local elections.

== Political positions ==
In her younger days, Cheng supported the Taiwan independence movement, and described both the Kuomintang and the Chinese Communist Party as "tyranny". Her political positions switched during her days with the Democratic Progressive Party, when she questioned the DPP's reaction to two-state theory and corruption scandals surrounding President Chen Shui-bian. She later became a strong opponent of Taiwanese independence, calling it "Taiwan independence fascism". She said that while President Lai Ching-te had not declared formal independence, his statements "conceal a pro-independence historical perspective and ideology", and accused the DPP of "green terror", referencing the White Terror, and also said the DPP was trying to "de-Sinicize Taiwan".

Cheng is also viewed as favoring closer relations with mainland China and supporting the 1992 Consensus. During her campaign to become Kuomintang chairperson, she said that she wants "all Taiwanese people to be able to proudly and confidently say, 'I am Chinese.'". She also stated that "Taiwan and the mainland should join forces to reach new heights in human civilization". She said that "At least 90% of Taiwan's culture, history, and bloodline are Chinese'", continuing by saying "We speak Chinese, write Chinese characters, eat Chinese food, and worship Chinese gods. That's why I say it's a very natural thing to say 'we are Chinese". Cheng supports easing cross-strait tensions with talks. She stated she is open to meeting Chinese leader Xi Jinping if "it could ease tensions and promote peaceful cooperation". She supports resuming the Cross-Strait Economic, Trade and Culture Forum between the Kuomintang and the Chinese Communist Party, which stopped in 2016.

Cheng supports close relations with the United States, but has warned against Taiwan over-relying on the US, saying Taiwan "must not become a sacrifice or Trump's bargaining chip" and that it "must not become another Ukraine". She also asked that "Could it be that the United States is treating Taiwan as a chess piece, a pawn, to strategically provoke the Chinese Communist Party at opportune times?" She opposes raising Taiwan's defense budget to five per cent of the gross domestic product, calling it "too high and unreasonable for Taiwan", and said it "cannot truly guarantee the security of the Taiwan Strait". She opposed opening Taiwan's agricultural market, saying it would "have a very serious, even fatal, impact" on Taiwanese farmers. In an interview held by Deutsche Welle, Cheng stated her worry that Taiwan under the presidency of Lai Ching-te would become like Ukraine under the Russian invasion. When the interviewer responded that "the dictator caused the war", she rejected the claim and described Vladimir Putin as "democratically elected", blaming the invasion on NATO enlargement. Cheng later confirmed the statement and expressed her surprise that Putin was being labeled a dictator. In December 2025, Cheng criticized the government's one-year suspension of Xiaohongshu in the country due to fraud concerns as "censorship."

== Personal life ==
Cheng met her husband, Luo Wu-chang (駱武昌), a former Taiwanese independence activist and classmate at National Taiwan University, in 1987. He was the executive director of the Taipei branch of the Democratic Progressive Party before becoming an associate professor at Chinese Culture University. After a 24-year relationship, Cheng and Luo married on 18 October 2011.

Party political offices
Preceded by Eric Chu	Chairwoman of the Kuomintang; 2025–present	Incumbent
