= Yiwu Wetland =

Wetland in Kouhu, Yunlin, Taiwan

- 椬梧濕地 (Chinese)
- Location within Yunlin County
- Location: Kouhu, Yunlin, Taiwan
- Coordinates: 23°32′38.3″N 120°10′38.4″E
- Type: wetland
- Surface area: 1,857 hectares (4,590 acres)

Yiwu Wetland (traditional Chinese: 椬梧濕地; simplified Chinese: 椬梧湿地; pinyin: Yíwú Shīdì) is a wetland in Kouhu Township, Yunlin County, Taiwan.

== History ==
The wetland was originally a sugarcane farm owned by Taiwan Sugar Corporation. But due to a typhoon which struck the region, it caused seawater intrusion and the wetland was created.

== Geology ==
The wetland spans over an area of 1,857 hectares. It consists of two ponds, the north pond and the south pond, which also acts as fish pond. It also features a cycling path, several observation decks and pavilions. The Baigung River, Jienshan Ditch and Niausong Ditch pass through the wetland.

== Transportation ==
The wetland is accessible by bus from Chiayi Station of Taiwan High Speed Rail.

== See also ==
- List of tourist attractions in Taiwan
