= National At-Large Constituency =

Constituency of the Legislative Yuan of Taiwan

National At-Large
- Constituency for the Legislative Yuan

Current constituency
- Created: 2008
- Seats: 34

The National At-Large and Overseas Compatriots Constituency (Chinese: 全國不分區及僑居國外國民選舉區), commonly known as the National At-Large Constituency (Chinese: 全國不分區), is a constituency of the Legislative Yuan, Taiwan's national legislature. The constituency contains 34 seats, and members are elected from party lists by proportional representation.

== Overview ==
The at-large constituency uses party-list proportional representation via the Hare quota. At least half of each party's elected candidate must be female.

== List of members ==
=== 2024 ===
- Democratic Progressive Party (13): Lin Yueh-chin, Puma Shen, Ariel Chang, Hung Sun-han, Lo Mei-ling, You Si-kun, Fan Yun, Ker Chien-ming, Shen Fa-hui, Chuang Jui-hsiung, Michelle Lin, Jean Kuo, Chen Pei-yu, Wang Cheng-hsu（replacing You Si-kun), Wang Yi-chuan（replacing Hung Sun-han）
- Kuomintang (13): Han Kuo-yu, Ko Chih-en, Ko Ju-chun, Weng Hsiao-ling, Chen Ching-Hui, Wu Chung-hsien, 林倩綺, Chen Yeong-kang, Hsu Yu-chen, Hsieh Lung-chieh, Su Ching-chuan, Chang Chia-chun, Wang Yu-min
- Taiwan People's Party (8): Huang Shan-shan, Huang Kuo-chang, Chen Gau-tzu, Wu Chun-cheng, Mạch Ngọc Trân, Lin Kuo-cheng, Lin Yi-chun, Chang Chi-kai
