= Kouhu =

Rural township in Yunlin, Taiwan

Coordinates: 23.57626°N 120.172523°E

Kouhu Township 口湖鄉
- Rural township
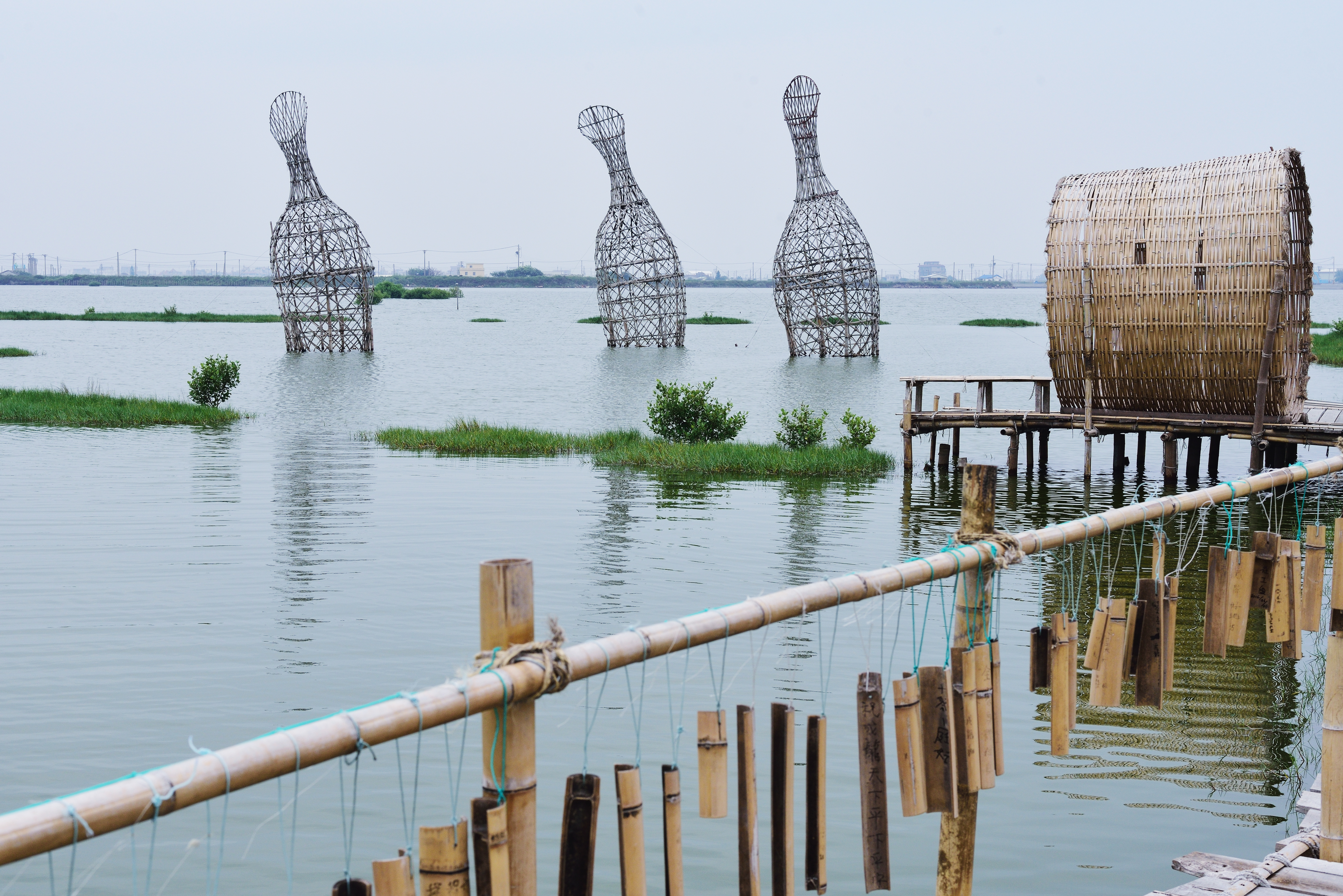
- Chenglong Wetlands in Kouhu Township

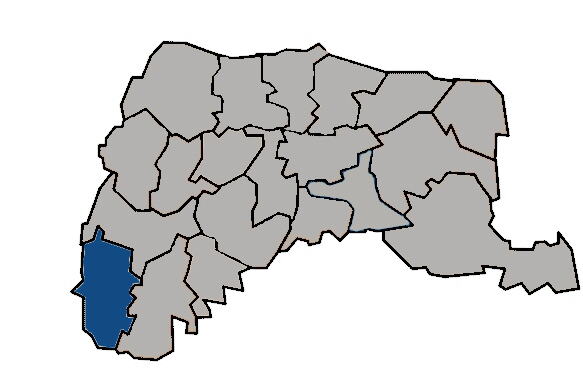
- Kouhu Township in Yunlin County
- Location: Yunlin County, Taiwan

Area
  - Total: 80 km^{2} (31 sq mi)

Population (February 2023)
  - Total: 24,882
  - Density: 310/km^{2} (810/sq mi)

Kouhu Township (Chinese: 口湖鄉; pinyin: Kǒuhú Xiāng) is a rural township in Yunlin County, Taiwan. It is known for seafood products such as red algae, eel, and karasumi.

== Geography ==
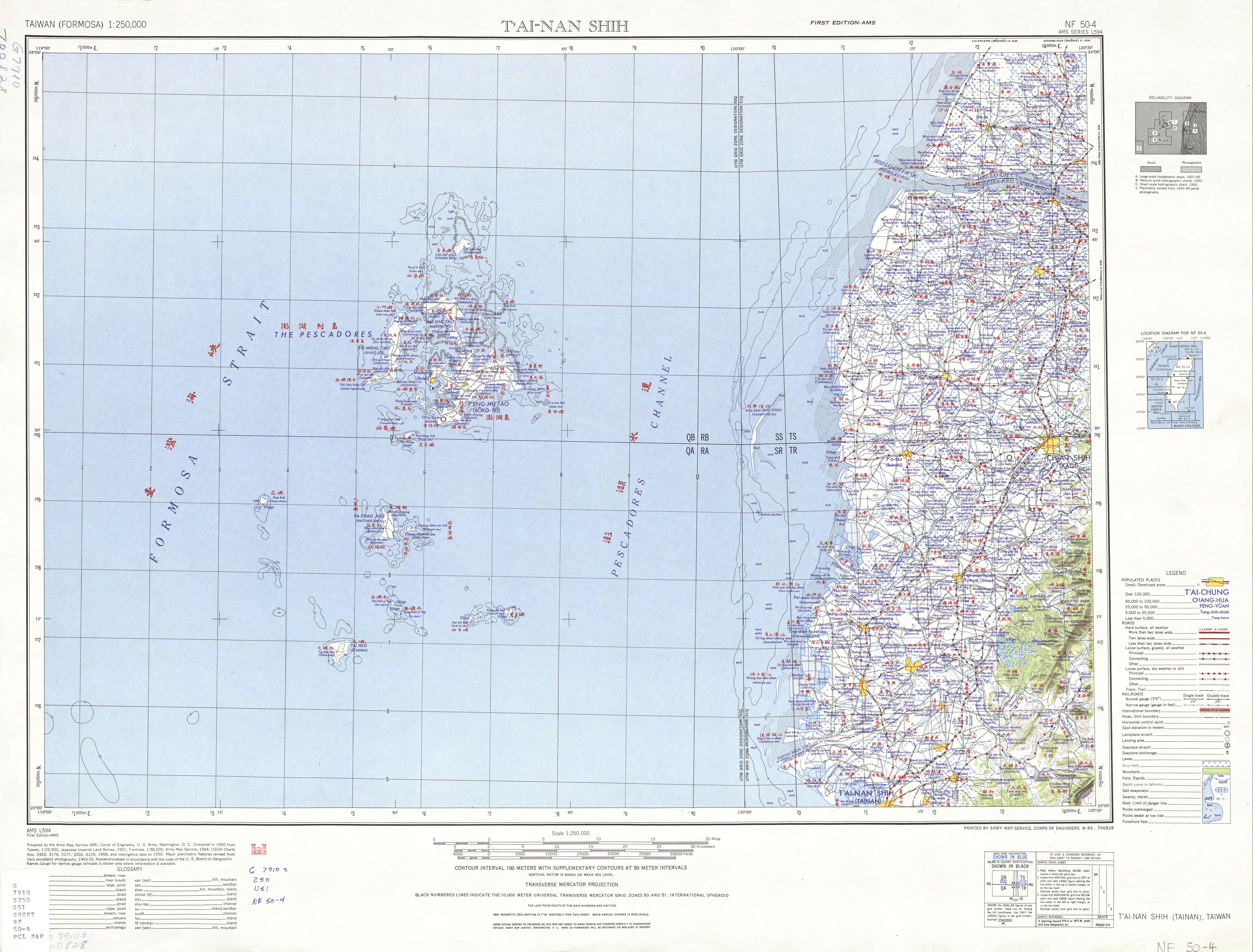
Map including Kouhu (labeled as K'ou-hu (Kōko) 口湖) (1950)

It has a population total of 24,882 and an area of 80.4612 square kilometers, including a section of coastline bordering the Taiwan Strait.

== History ==
Owing to the existence of a large lagoon shaped like an elephant's trunk in the area, Kouhu was known as Xiangbihu (Elephant Trunk Lake) in the late Ming and Qing periods.

Kouhu's coastal waters were traditionally used in oyster farming, but in 1991 they were zoned for offshore industrial use.

== Administrative divisions ==
The township comprises 21 villages: Chenglong, Dinghu, Gangtung, Gangxi, Guogang, Houcuo, Hukou, Hutung, Jinghan, Keliao, Kouhu, Luntung, Lunjhong, Pubei, Punan, Shueijing, Sialun, Siecuo, Taizih, Wubei, and Wunan.

== Infrastructure ==
Kouhu is one of the areas proposed by the Taiwan Power Company for an underground electricity cable connecting it with Jianshan Village in Penghu's Huxi Township.

== Festivals ==
- Qian Shui Che Zhuang Festival

== Tourist attractions ==
- Chenglong Wetlands
- Yiwu Wetland

== Transportation ==
- Provincial Highway 61
- Provincial Highway 17 (Taiwan)
- County Highway 164

== Climate ==
Climate data for Kouhu (2019–2023, extremes 2019–present)
Month	Jan	Feb	Mar	Apr	May	Jun	Jul	Aug	Sep	Oct	Nov	Dec	Year
Record high °C (°F)	28.2 (82.8)	30.3 (86.5)	30.2 (86.4)	30.5 (86.9)	32.1 (89.8)	33.0 (91.4)	34.3 (93.7)	33.4 (92.1)	33.7 (92.7)	32.6 (90.7)	30.8 (87.4)	29.3 (84.7)	34.3 (93.7)
Mean daily maximum °C (°F)	20.4 (68.7)	21.4 (70.5)	24.4 (75.9)	26.4 (79.5)	28.8 (83.8)	30.9 (87.6)	31.7 (89.1)	31.2 (88.2)	31.2 (88.2)	28.8 (83.8)	26.1 (79.0)	21.7 (71.1)	26.9 (80.5)
Daily mean °C (°F)	16.9 (62.4)	17.7 (63.9)	20.5 (68.9)	23.0 (73.4)	25.9 (78.6)	28.2 (82.8)	28.9 (84.0)	28.4 (83.1)	27.9 (82.2)	25.3 (77.5)	22.5 (72.5)	18.5 (65.3)	23.6 (74.6)
Mean daily minimum °C (°F)	14.4 (57.9)	15.0 (59.0)	17.6 (63.7)	20.2 (68.4)	23.4 (74.1)	25.7 (78.3)	26.3 (79.3)	26.0 (78.8)	25.3 (77.5)	22.7 (72.9)	19.7 (67.5)	16.0 (60.8)	21.0 (69.9)
Record low °C (°F)	7.5 (45.5)	8.1 (46.6)	12.0 (53.6)	12.3 (54.1)	16.2 (61.2)	22.6 (72.7)	23.2 (73.8)	23.8 (74.8)	21.2 (70.2)	18.7 (65.7)	12.3 (54.1)	8.3 (46.9)	7.5 (45.5)
Average precipitation mm (inches)	23.2 (0.91)	22.1 (0.87)	49.8 (1.96)	68.9 (2.71)	137.8 (5.43)	268.1 (10.56)	182.8 (7.20)	314.4 (12.38)	86.4 (3.40)	17.0 (0.67)	13.0 (0.51)	27.0 (1.06)	1,210.5 (47.66)
Average precipitation days	4.9	4.4	6.5	5.0	8.0	12.5	10.9	13.4	5.8	2.5	2.9	2.6	79.4
Average relative humidity (%)	75.4	76.4	75.5	74.0	77.8	77.8	76.0	78.4	74.4	73.2	74.8	73.6	75.6
Source 1: Central Weather Administration
Source 2: Atmospheric Science Research and Application Databank (precipitation 2016–2023)

== Notable natives ==
- Cheng Li-wun, Chairperson of Kuomintang

== See also ==
- List of Taiwanese superlatives
