= 2028 Taiwanese presidential election =

- TBD
| Party | DPP | KMT | TPP |
- Taiwan by administrative divisions
Incumbent President
Lai Ching-te
DPP

Presidential elections are scheduled to be held in Taiwan during 2028. Incumbent President Lai Ching-te of the Democratic Progressive Party (DPP), who was elected in 2024, is eligible to seek a second term. The winner of the 2028 presidential election is scheduled to be inaugurated on 20 May 2028.

== Background ==
In March 2024, Kuomintang (KMT) legislator Weng Hsiao-ling proposed amendments to the Presidential and Vice Presidential Election and Recall Act (總統副總統選舉罷免法) to establish a two-round system for the 2028 presidential election. Democratic Progressive Party lawmakers Michelle Lin and Rosalia Wu claimed that Weng's amendments were unconstitutional, and Weng's KMT colleague Lai Shyh-bao expressed concerns about the cost of a two-round vote. In September 2025, Weng, Lo Chih-chiang, Yeh Yuan-chih, and Wu Tsung-hsien announced that they planned to propose constitutional and legal amendments in the upcoming Legislative Yuan session related to the two-round system. The following month, Weng proposed that Article 62 of the Presidential and Vice Presidential Election and Recall Act be amended to require a presidential ticket win a majority of votes cast and twenty percent of the eligible electorate. If the benchmark is not met in the first round, the vote progresses to a second round, where the pair of running mates with the most votes is declared the victor. Lo began organizing a signature drive and petition to amend the Additional Articles of the Constitution in a similar fashion.

== Potential candidates ==
=== Democratic Progressive Party ===
- Lai Ching-te, incumbent President of the Republic of China.

=== Kuomintang ===
- Cheng Li-wun, Chairwoman of the Kuomintang.
- Chiang Wan-an, Mayor of Taipei

== Foreign interference ==
According to a December 2025 report in Yomiuri Shimbun, China has begun deploying online disinformation campaigns in an effort to prevent Lai Ching-te from being reelected.
