= Tony Jian =

Taiwanese physician and politician (1955–2024)

Tony Jian MLY
- 簡肇棟
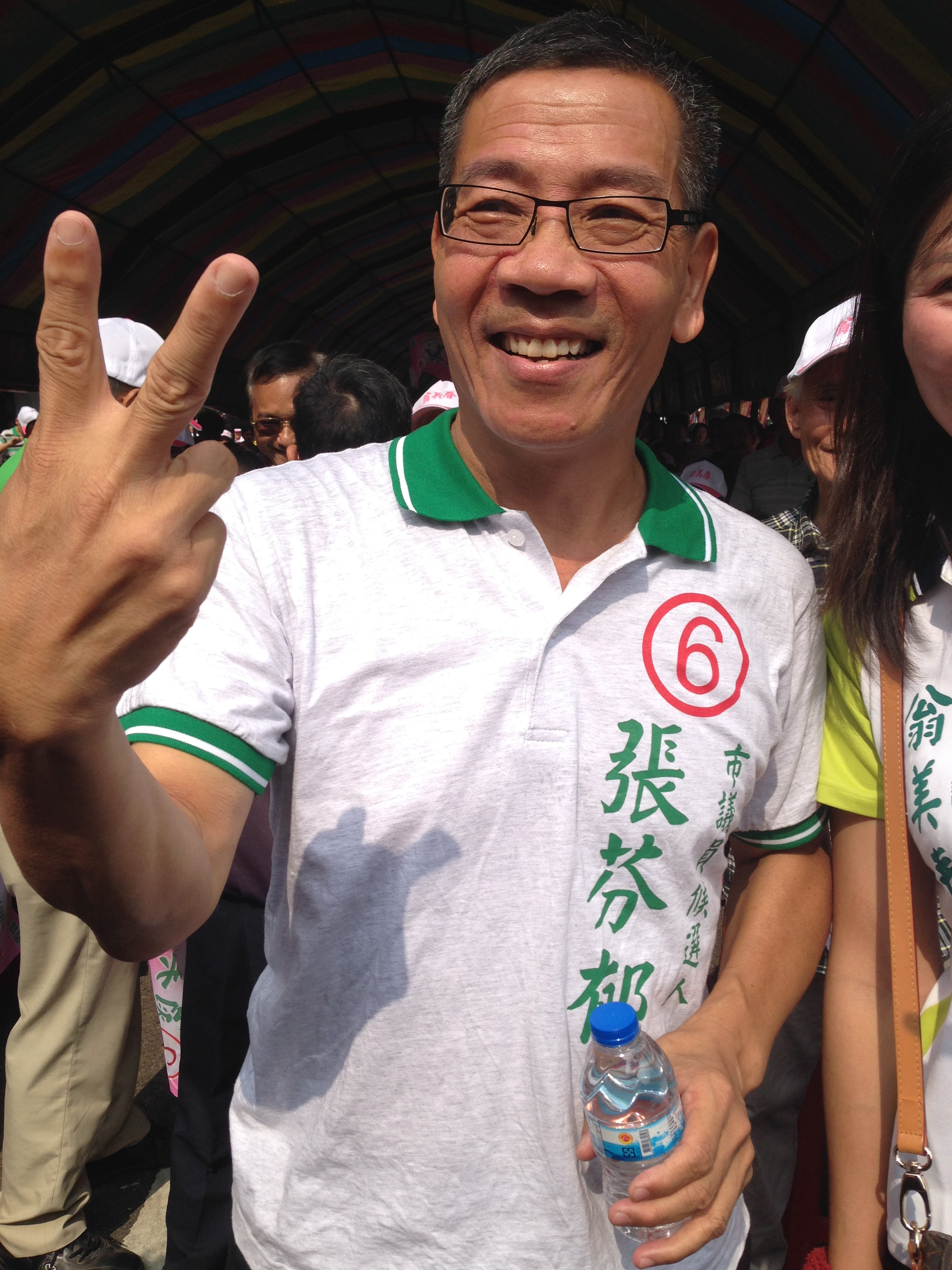
- Jian in 2014

Member of the Legislative Yuan
- In office 18 January 2010 – 13 September 2011
- Preceded by: Chiang Lien-fu
- Succeeded by: Ho Hsin-chun
- Constituency: Taichung 7
- In office 1 February 2002 – 31 January 2005
- Constituency: Taichung County

Personal details
- Born: 18 August 1955 Taichung, Taiwan
- Died: 29 November 2024 (aged 69) South District, Taichung, Taiwan
- Party: Democratic Progressive Party
- Spouse: Chang Phen-yu
- Education: Chung Shan Medical University (MD); Tunghai University; National Chung Hsing University (MA)

Tony Jian (Chinese: 簡肇棟; pinyin: Jiǎn Zhàodòng; 18 August 1955 – 29 November 2024) was a Taiwanese physician and politician. He was a member of the Legislative Yuan from 2002 to 2005, then returned to office in 2010 via a by-election, resigning the position the following year.

== Education ==
Jian earned his medical degree at Chung Shan Medical University, and obtained a master's degree in international politics at National Chung Hsing University after beginning studies in a related field at the Department of Public Administration of Tunghai University.

== Career ==
Prior to his involvement in politics, Jian was a physician specializing in thoracic medicine. He was mayor of Dali, Taichung from 1998 to 2002, when he first won election to the Legislative Yuan. During his first term, Jian was named to the legislature's Health, Environment and Social Welfare Committee. He opposed a plan to reduce Public Welfare Lottery drawings because people with disabilities who sold tickets would earn less money. Jian has worked to improve Taiwan's international space, and was critical of the World Health Assembly and World Trade Organization, which barred Taiwanese participation due to political pressure from China. Jian sought to limit immigration from China to Taiwan, and proposed that naturalized citizens of Chinese origin be barred from voting in elections for seven years after acquiring Republic of China citizenship. Jian believed that financial statements of medical institutions should remain private information, a stance ridiculed by the Taiwan Health Reform Foundation.

Jian was a candidate in both the 2004 and 2008 legislative elections, but lost both times. He challenged the 2008 result in court, and Jian's Kuomintang opponent Chiang Lien-fu was indicted on 29 January 2008. On 27 February, Chiang's win was annulled. A by election was held on 9 January 2010, which Jian won, defeating Yu Wen-chin. Jian resigned from the legislature on 13 September 2011, after causing a fatal traffic collision. Ho Hsin-chun was named the DPP candidate for Jian's constituency, and succeeded him in office. Following his resignation, Jian resumed his medical career at his clinic in Dali.

== Personal life and death ==
Jian's wife Chang Fen-yu has served on the Taichung City Council.

Jian was diagnosed with esophageal cancer in September 2024 by staff of the Chung Shan Medical University Hospital, who found a tumor thirteen centimeters in length in his stomach. He later fell into a coma, and died on 29 November 2024, at the age of 69.
