= Wang Qianqiu =

Taiwanese politician

Wang Qianqiu (born August 3, 1973) is a Taiwanese politician and journalist. She has previously served as a reporter for SET News, Director of the Information Bureau of the Kaohsiung City Government (4th Director), municipal policy advisor to the Kaohsiung City Government, and Chief Spokesperson of Han Kuo-yu’s presidential campaign headquarters.

Wang Qianqiu currently hosts several broadcast programs, including Qianqiu Wan Shi on China Broadcasting Corporation News Network, Citizen Congress and News Plain Talk on the TVBS channel, and Election Mirror Talks on Mirror TV.

== Early life ==
Wang Qianqiu was born in Xizhi Township, Taipei County (now Xizhi District, New Taipei City), Taiwan. She studied in the Editorial and Reporting Department at World News Vocational School (now Shih Hsin University). She earned a bachelor’s degree from the Department of Public Administration at the College of Law and Business, National Chung Hsing University (now the Department of Public Administration and Policy, National Taipei University), and later obtained a master’s degree from the Executive MBA program (Cultural and Creative Industry Group) at National Chengchi University.

== Career ==
Wang Qianqiu has served as a reporter for USTV News Department, CTi News Department, TVBS News Department, and SET News Department. She has also worked as Associate Director of Public Relations at Leofoo Tourism Group, Deputy Chief Executive Officer of the Zhuang Fu Cultural and Educational Foundation, Special Assistant to the Chairman and CEO of Taipei 101, CSR Manager of the General Manager’s Office at Taipei 101, and Senior Researcher at the Spokesperson’s Office of the Taipei City Government.

In 2008, while serving as Senior Researcher at the Spokesperson’s Office of the Taipei City Government, she participated in an inspection trip accompanying the Mayor of Taipei to Shanghai to visit the 2010 World Expo, witnessing the signing of agreements. She also facilitated the official launch of the Taipei–Shanghai Twin-City Forum in 2010.

On December 25, 2018, Wang was appointed Director of the Information Bureau of the Kaohsiung City Government under Mayor Han Kuo-yu. [6] She resigned from the position on December 5, 2019, and subsequently assumed the role of Chief Spokesperson for Han Kuo-yu’s presidential campaign headquarters. After Han’s defeat in the presidential election, Wang traveled to Spain for vacation and stated that she had no plans to return to work for the Kaohsiung City Government.

From January 13 to June 11, 2020, she served as a municipal policy advisor to the Kaohsiung City Government.

Beginning on August 31, 2020, Wang became the weekday (Monday to Friday, 8:00–10:00 a.m.) host of Qianqiu Wan Shi on China Broadcasting Corporation News Network.

In May 2021, she took over as the weekend host of Citizen Congress on the TVBS channel.
