= Xinshi Township =

Xinshi Township 新市乡
- Township
- Location in Sichuan
- Coordinates: 30°50′54″N 106°41′35″E
- Country: People's Republic of China
- Province: Sichuan
- Prefecture-level city: Dazhou
- County: Qu
- Village-level divisions: 1 residential community 6 villages
- Elevation: 364 m (1,194 ft)
- Time zone: UTC+8 (China Standard)
- Area code: 0818

Xinshi (Chinese: 新市; pinyin: Xīnshì) is a township of Qu County in northeastern Sichuan province, China, located about 26 kilometres (16 mi) west of the county seat. As of 2011, it has one residential community (社区) and six villages under its administration.
