= Weng Hsiao-ling =

Taiwanese politician (born 1969)

Weng Hsiao-ling MLY
- 翁曉玲
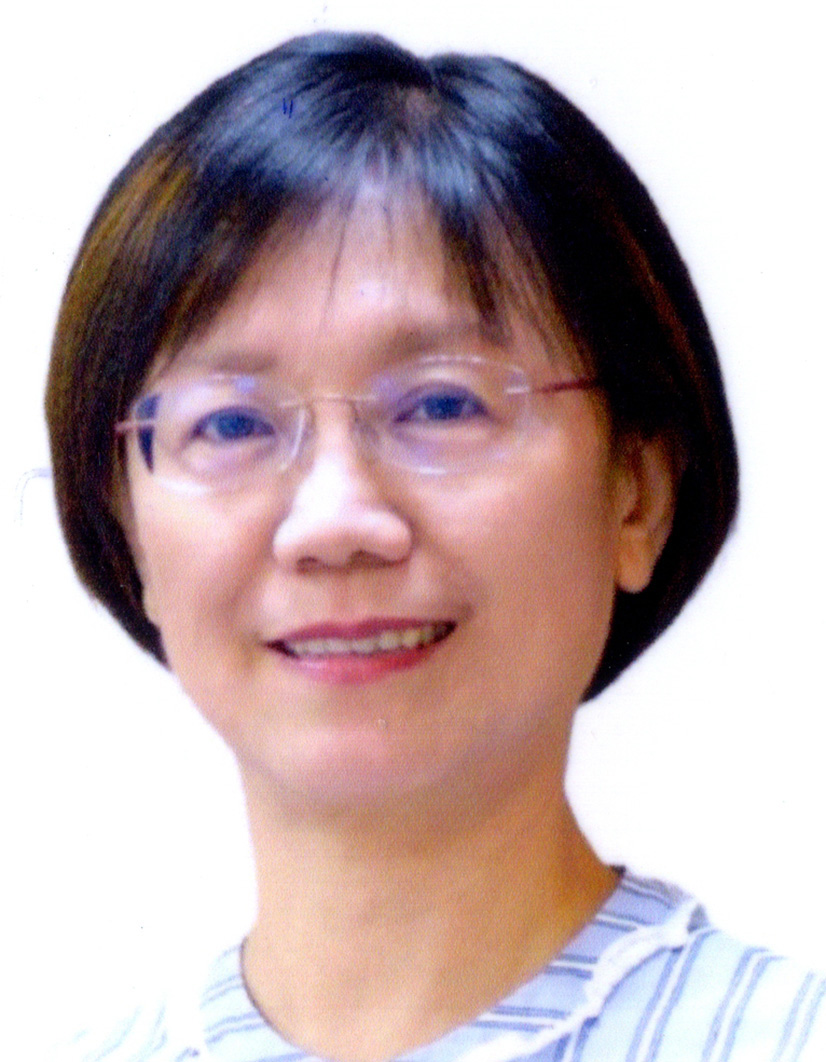

Member of the Legislative Yuan
- Incumbent
- Assumed office 1 February 2024
- Constituency: Party-list

National Communications Commissioner
- In office 1 August 2008 – 31 July 2012

Personal details
- Born: 18 January 1969 (age 57) Kaohsiung, Taiwan
- Party: Kuomintang
- Education: National Chung Hsing University (LLB); LMU Munich (LLM, PhD)
- Scientific career
- Fields: Competition law
- Thesis: Eine Untersuchung zur Bedeutung der Kunstfreiheitsgarantie für die Anwendung des 1 UWG (1999)
- Doctoral advisor: Heinrich Scholler

Weng Hsiao-ling (Chinese: 翁曉玲; pinyin: Wēng Xiǎolíng; born 18 January 1969) is a Taiwanese legal scholar and politician. She served on the National Communications Commission from 2008 to 2012, and was elected to the Legislative Yuan in 2024.

== Early life and education ==
Weng was born on 18 January 1969 in Huangpu Seventh Village (黃埔七村), a residential compound for Republic of China Military Academy personnel in Fengshan, Kaohsiung County (now part of Kaohsiung). Her mother was a teacher of waishengren background. Her father, Weng Chi-hsiung (翁啟雄), was a Taiwanese-born military officer who graduated first in his class from the Republic of China Military Academy. Chi-hsiung was awarded a scholarship to study at the University of Illinois, where he earned his doctorate. He served as education director at the Chung Cheng Institute of Technology before retiring with the rank of major general. He then became president of National Chin-Yi University of Technology, serving from 1989 to 1996.

Weng's paternal grandfather, Weng Chung-tzu (翁鐘賜), came from a prominent family in Yizhu, Chiayi County, and graduated from Keio University in Japan in 1928. Chung-tzu was a supporter of the Taiwanese Cultural Association. He became a businessman in Java, then part of the Dutch East Indies.

Weng spent her early childhood in Huangpu military dependents' village, which was adjacent to Republic of China Military Academy. In 1979, when she was ten years old, her family moved north to Taoyuan following her father's reassignment to the Chung Cheng Institute of Technology. After high school, she graduated from National Chung Hsing University with a Bachelor of Laws in 1991.

In 1992, Weng earned a Master of Laws (LL.M.) degree from LMU Munich in Germany. She then earned her Ph.D. in law from the university under the supervision of German legal scholar Heinrich Scholler in 1998. Her doctoral dissertation, written in German, was titled, Eine Untersuchung zur Bedeutung der Kunstfreiheitsgarantie für die Anwendung des 1 UWG.

== Academic career ==
After receiving her doctorate, Weng returned to Taiwan and became a law professor at National Defense University, National Chung Hsing University, and National Tsing Hua University.

== Political career ==
=== National Communications Commission ===
Weng was one of six newcomers nominated to serve on the National Communications Commission in July 2008, after the term of the previous commission had ended in January of that same year. At the time of her nomination to the NCC, Weng was a political independent. All nominees, including Weng, were approved by the Legislative Yuan's joint committee on education, culture, and transportation, and met with journalists for the first time the following month. In February 2009, Weng attended a hearing convened to discuss amendments to the Satellite Radio and Television Act. The following year, Weng commented on government investment in Taiwanese media, discussed amendments to the Broadcasting and Television Act, clarified aspects of NCC decisions, and opposed a proposal allowing the Executive Yuan to select the NCC chair and vice chair.

Weng was not renominated to her NCC post. In 2012, her final year in office, Weng, Chen Jeng-chang, and Chung Chi-hui withdrew from a case involving Want Want and China Network Systems. Three years previously, as Want Want acquired the China Times, China Television, and Chung T'ien Television, images of Weng, Cheng, and Chung had been published on the China Times front page in the manner of wanted posters. The merger between Want Want and China Network Systems was approved in late July 2008, with days left in Weng's NCC term. During her final month on the National Communications Commission, television shopping network U-Life filed a lawsuit against Weng, alleging that she had favored the Eastern Home and Leisure Company in an application filed by the Kbro Company.

=== Legislative Yuan ===
After her NCC tenure ended, Weng returned to her associate professorship in law at National Tsing Hua University. She did not return to politics until the 2024 legislative election, when she was ranked fourth on the Kuomintang party list for proportional representation and elected to the 11th Legislative Yuan.

Weng proposed amendments to the Act Governing the Legislative Yuan’s Power and the Criminal Code, criminalizing the contempt of the legislature.

In June 2024, she accused President Lai Ching-te of treason and criticized defense minister Wellington Koo for failing to maintain maps that showed Mongolia as part of the Republic of China.

Weng then presented a 1912 map of the Republic of China, which included Mongolia, Tannu Uriankhai, Vladivostok, Tibet, Nine-dash line and the Kuril Islands, and asked, "Why don't you restore the policy to "retake Mainland China by force" (反攻大陸)? Or is it that none of us, the citizens of the Republic of China, should take that stance? Is this just your personal opinion? The mainland is part of the territory of the Republic of China." Weng further inquired about President Lai Ching-te's statement that "the two sides of the Taiwan Strait are not subordinate to each other," questioning if it implied recognition of the People's Republic of China (PRC). Koo responded by affirming that the PRC "is an existing fact, and there is no doubt about it." Weng then retorted, stating, "We don't care how the other countries recognize it by acknowledging the People's Republic of China (PRC). The territorial scope of the PRC includes Taiwan. Being the president of the Republic of China (ROC), such statements of Lai Ching-te diminish Taiwan's status, abandon the ROC's territorial integrity, and provide the PRC a justified reason to 'recover' Taiwan. President Lai is thus seen as a traitor to the Republic of China, hence acknowledging the PRC constitutes a significant harm to the Republic of China."

In July 2024, Weng once again reiterated this viewpoint, stating that the territory of the Republic of China should extend "west to the Pamir Plateau, east to Heilongjiang, north to the Sayan Range, and south to Zengmu Ansha." She further demanded that the Minister of National Defense prepare for a "counteroffensive against the mainland." In response, the Taiwan Statebuilding Party stated, "It seems that Weng has traveled through time from 1949, which clearly shows that the Kuomintang must be eliminated."

After Taiwanese badminton players Lee Yang and Wang Chi-lin won the men's doubles gold medal at the 2024 Summer Olympics against Liang Weikeng and Wang Chang of China, Weng posted to WeChat, that the Lee–Wang victory was the "pride of Chinese people." When asked about her post, Weng elaborated, "We are Chinese... No matter who wins, Team Taiwan or the team from mainland China, it is still the pride of Chinese people. Taiwanese is Chinese. I see nothing wrong in my statement."

On 8 August 2024, in an interview with Wang Qianqiu Weng said that she considers herself Chinese, but clarified that she was a Chinese from the Republic of China and that the People's Republic of China should not have exclusive use of the term "China" .

== Personal life ==
Weng's husband is the judge Chen Chun-sheng.
