= Taichung Municipal Taichung Girls' Senior High School =

- 臺中市立臺中女子高級中學

Location
- No.95, Sec. 1, Ziyou Rd., West Dist. Taichung City; 40342; Taiwan
- Coordinates: 24.135846°N 120.677596°E

Information
- School type: Public High School
- Established: 1919
- Grades: 10-12
- Campus type: Urban
- Website: http://www.tcgs.tc.edu.tw

Taichung Municipal Taichung Girls' Senior High School (TCGS; Chinese: 臺中市立臺中女子高級中學, also 台中女中) is a senior high school in West District, Taichung, Taiwan.

Taichung Girls' Senior High School is one of the most selective high schools in Taichung and is frequently referred to as one of Taiwan's "Star High Schools" (Chinese: 明星高中).

The school has a well-known marching band that has been invited to perform at events such as the Taichung City National Day celebrations.

== Notable alumnae ==
- Chyi Yu, singer
- Kolas Yotaka, Taiwanese politician
- Lulu Huang Lu Zi Yin, television host, singer and actress
