= List of candidates in the 2008 Taiwanese legislative election =

Candidates and results of the Constituency and aboriginal ballots of the 7th Election of Legislators in Taiwan in 2008.

Most names on this list follow the Tongyong Pinyin romanization used by the Central Commission Committee Website and may not represent the candidates' preferred romanization of their name.

== Taipei City ==
=== Taipei City Constituency 1 ===
- Eligible voters: 258,007
- Total votes cast (Ratio): 159,946 (61.99%)
- Valid Votes (Ratio): 158,300 (98.97%)
- Invalid Votes (Ratio): 1,646 (1.03%)

No.	Candidate	Party	Votes	Ratio	Elected
1	Jhang Li Yuan (張歷元)	Taiwan Farmers' Party	336	0.21%	
2	Kao Chien-chih	Democratic Progressive Party	61,408	38.79%	
3	Ting Shou-chung (丁守中)	Kuomintang	94,694	59.82%	Yes
4	Ceng Jin Pei (曾瑾珮)	Green Party Taiwan	1,862	1.18%	

=== Taipei City Constituency 2 ===
- Eligible voters: 253,636
- Total votes cast (Ratio): 157,585 (62.13%)
- Valid Votes (Ratio): 155,317 (98.56%)
- Invalid Votes (Ratio): 2,268 (1.44%)

No.	Candidate	Party	Votes	Ratio	Elected
1	Jou Yi-cheng (周奕成)	Third Society Party	2,812	1.81%	
2	Justin Chou	Kuomintang	81,386	52.40%	Yes
3	Wang Shih-chien	Democratic Progressive Party	71,119	45.79%	

=== Taipei City Constituency 3 ===
- Eligible voters: 272,241
- Total votes cast (Ratio): 168,068 (61.74%)
- Valid Votes (Ratio): 165,890 (98.70%)
- Invalid Votes (Ratio): 2,178 (1.30%)

No.	Candidate	Party	Votes	Ratio	Elected
1	John Chiang	Kuomintang	99,959	60.25%	Yes
2	Li Lin Yao (李林耀)	Taiwan Constitution Association	128	0.08%	
3	Sie Fu Mi (謝馥米)	Taiwan Solidarity Union	1,854	1.12%	
4	Jian Ruei Kuan (簡瑞寬)	Taiwan Constitution Association	176	0.11%	
5	Julian Kuo	Democratic Progressive Party	63,773	38.44%	

=== Taipei City Constituency 4 ===
- Eligible voters: 280,614
- Total votes cast (Ratio): 171,665 (61.17%)
- Valid Votes (Ratio): 169,272 (98.61%)
- Invalid Votes (Ratio): 2,393 (1.39%)

No.	Candidate	Party	Votes	Ratio	Elected
1	Jhuang Wan Yun (莊婉均)	Independent	1,684	0.99%	
2	Jhang Cing Yuan (張慶源)	Independent	470	0.28%	
3	Alex Tsai	Kuomintang	105,375	62.26%	Yes
4	Syu Jia Chen (許家琛)	Independent	159	0.09%	
5	Ke Yi Min (柯逸民)	Green Party Taiwan	1,580	0.93%	
6	Hsu Kuo-yung	Democratic Progressive Party	60,004	35.45%	

=== Taipei City Constituency 5 ===
- Eligible voters: 238,616
- Total votes cast (Ratio): 151,986 (63.69%)
- Valid Votes (Ratio): 150,147 (98.79%)
- Invalid Votes (Ratio): 1,839 (1.21%)

No.	Candidate	Party	Votes	Ratio	Elected
1	Ye Mei (葉玫)	Home Party	324	0.22%	
2	Wu Jian Yi (吳建毅)	Taiwan Farmers' Party	251	0.17%	
3	Wei Jhih Jhong (魏志中)	Independent	284	0.19%	
4	Lin Yu-fang	Kuomintang	87,448	58.23%	Yes
5	Huang Ci Bin (黃啟彬)	Taiwan Constitution Association	360	0.24%	
6	Tuan Yi-kang	Democratic Progressive Party	61,480	40.95%	

=== Taipei City Constituency 6 ===
- Eligible voters: 241,393
- Total votes cast (Ratio): 150,203 (62.22%)
- Valid Votes (Ratio): 148,634 (98.96%)
- Invalid Votes (Ratio): 1,569 (1.04%)

No.	Candidate	Party	Votes	Ratio	Elected
1	Yue Ke Ming (樂可銘)	Taiwan Constitution Association	89	0.06%	
2	Diane Lee	Kuomintang	99,294	66.80%	Yes
3	Wang Bao Shan (王保善)	Home Party	417	0.28%	
4	Yu Shao Jyun (余少鈞)	Hakka Party	131	0.09%	
5	Luo Wen-jia	Democratic Progressive Party	48,240	32.46%	
6	Gu Wun Fa (古文發)	Democratic Freedom Party (民主自由黨)	155	0.10%	
7	Lin Jyun Sian (林俊賢)	Taiwan Farmers' Party	221	0.15%	
8	Lin Yu Fa (林裕發)	Taiwan Constitution Association	87	0.06%	

=== Taipei City Constituency 7 ===
- Eligible voters: 238,520
- Total votes cast (Ratio): 146,314 (61.34%)
- Valid Votes (Ratio): 144,612 (98.84%)
- Invalid Votes (Ratio): 1,702 (1.16%)

No.	Candidate	Party	Votes	Ratio	Elected
1	Jhang Guo Cing (張國慶)	Taiwan Solidarity Union	1,350	0.93%	
2	Lian Shih Lei (連石磊)	Hakka Party	241	0.17%	
3	Chen Yuan Ci (陳源奇)	Dadao Compassion Jishih Party (大道慈悲濟世黨)	229	0.16%	
4	Pan Han Sheng (潘翰聲)	Green Party Taiwan	1,275	0.88%	
5	Alex Fai	Kuomintang (New Party Endorsement)	95,145	65.79%	Yes
6	Tian Sin (田欣)	Democratic Progressive Party	46,059	31.85%	
7	Cin Jheng De (秦政德)	Third Society Party	313	0.22%	

=== Taipei City Constituency 8 ===
- Eligible voters: 231,411
- Total votes cast (Ratio): 146,614 (63.36%)
- Valid Votes (Ratio): 145,173 (99.02%)
- Invalid Votes (Ratio): 1,441 (0.98%)

No.	Candidate	Party	Votes	Ratio	Elected
1	Mei Fong (梅峰)	Independent	171	0.12%	
2	Ren Li Min (任立民)	Home Party	234	0.16%	
3	Chou Po-ya (周柏雅)	Democratic Progressive Party	38,261	26.36%	
4	Lai Shyh-bao	Kuomintang (New Party Endorsement)	104,257	71.81%	Yes
5	Shih Mei Yan (史美延)	Third Society Party	492	0.34%	
6	Fang Ying Jyun (方景鈞)	Independent	277	0.19%	
7	Peng Yan Wun (彭渰雯)	Green Party Taiwan	1,481	1.02%	

== Kaohsiung City ==
=== Kaohsiung City Constituency 1 ===
- Eligible voters: 256,225
- Total votes cast (Ratio): 160,229 (62.53%)
- Valid Votes (Ratio): 158,524 (98.94%)
- Invalid Votes (Ratio): 1,705 (1.06%)

No.	Candidate	Party	Votes	Ratio	Elected
1	Huang Chao-shun	Kuomintang	92,417	58.30%	Yes
2	Pasuya Yao	Democratic Progressive Party	65,266	41.17%	
3	Cian Huei Yang (錢彙穎)	Civil Party	841	0.53%	

=== Kaohsiung City Constituency 2 ===
- Eligible voters: 212,649
- Total votes cast (Ratio): 131,312 (61.75%)
- Valid Votes (Ratio): 129,808 (98.85%)
- Invalid Votes (Ratio): 1,504 (1.15%)

No.	Candidate	Party	Votes	Ratio	Elected
1	Lwo Shih-hsiung	Kuomintang	63,410	48.85%	
2	Lee Ching-yu	Home Party	424	0.33%	
3	Ceng Wun Sheng (曾文聖)	Taiwan Constitution Association	186	0.14%	
4	Lin Cheng Syong (林稱雄)	Independent	184	0.14%	
5	Kuan Bi-ling	Democratic Progressive Party	65,604	50.54%	Yes

=== Kaohsiung City Constituency 3 ===
- Eligible voters: 196,798
- Total votes cast (Ratio): 117,177 (59.54%)
- Valid Votes (Ratio): 115,647 (98.69%)
- Invalid Votes (Ratio): 1,530 (1.31%)

No.	Candidate	Party	Votes	Ratio	Elected
1	Jhuang Siou Cih (莊繡慈)	Taiwan Farmers' Party	777	0.67%	
2	Hou Tsai-feng (侯彩鳳)	Kuomintang	56,826	49.14%	Yes
3	Lee Kun-tse (李昆澤)	Democratic Progressive Party	49,392	42.71%	
4	Wu Chun Siang (吳春香)	Hakka Party	249	0.22%	
5	Lin Chin-hsing	Independent	8,225	7.11%	
6	Su Jing Meng (蘇經孟)	Civil Party	178	0.15%	

=== Kaohsiung City Constituency 4 ===
- Eligible voters: 243,294
- Total votes cast (Ratio): 147,321 (60.55%)
- Valid Votes (Ratio): 145,153 (98.53%)
- Invalid Votes (Ratio): 2,168 (1.47%)

No.	Candidate	Party	Votes	Ratio	Elected
1	Huang Chao-hui	Democratic Progressive Party	67,663	46.61%	
2	Lin Ying Yuan (林景元)	Independent	1,626	1.12%	
3	Liou Huei Wun (劉慧雯)	Taiwan Farmers' Party	1,105	0.76%	
4	Lin Jhih Cong (林志聰)	Civil Party	257	0.18%	
5	Lee Fu-hsing	Kuomintang	74,502	51.33%	Yes

=== Kaohsiung City Constituency 5 ===
- Eligible voters: 237,314
- Total votes cast (Ratio): 138,039 (58.17%)
- Valid Votes (Ratio): 135,775 (98.36%)
- Invalid Votes (Ratio): 2,264 (1.64%)

No.	Candidate	Party	Votes	Ratio	Elected
1	Kuo Wen-cheng (郭玟成)	Democratic Progressive Party	70,576	51.97%	Yes
2	Cao Wun Wun (曹文玟)	Hakka Party	444	0.33%	
3	Yang Jhang Chao (楊掌朝)	Hongyun Jhongyi Party (洪運忠義黨)	581	0.43%	
4	Jhao Lian Chu (趙連出)	Da Dao Ci Bei Ji Shi Party (大道慈悲濟世黨)	1,098	0.81%	
5	Yang Mei Lan (楊美蘭)	Civil Party	596	0.44%	
6	Lin Kuo-cheng	Kuomintang	62,480	46.02%	

== Keelung City ==
- Eligible voters: 290,672
- Total votes cast (Ratio): 148,278 (51.01%)
- Valid Votes (Ratio): 145,930 (98.42%)
- Invalid Votes (Ratio): 2,348 (1.58%)

No.	Candidate	Party	Votes	Ratio	Elected
1	You Hsiang-yao (游祥耀)	Democratic Progressive Party	41,709	28.58%	
2	Lyu Jhen Jhong (呂貞中)	Civil Party	1,869	1.28%	
3	Wang Sing Jhih (王醒之)	Green Party Taiwan (Joint with Raging Citizens Act Now! (人民火大行動聯盟))	3,426	2.35%	
4	Hsieh Kuo-liang	Kuomintang	98,926	67.79%	Yes

== Hsinchu City ==
- Eligible voters: 285,433
- Total votes cast (Ratio): 165,893 (58.12%)
- Valid Votes (Ratio): 163,517 ()
- Invalid Votes (Ratio): 2,376 ()

No.	Candidate	Party	Votes	Ratio	Elected
1	Lu Hsueh-chang (呂學樟)	Kuomintang	99,124	60.62%	Yes
2	Cheng Hung-huei (鄭宏輝)	Democratic Progressive Party	62,334	38.12%	
3	Deng Hsiu-bao (鄧秀寶)	Democratic Freedom Party (民主自由黨)	2,059	1.26%	

== Taichung City ==
=== Taichung City Constituency 1 ===
- Eligible voters: 237,813
- Total votes cast (Ratio): 140,417 (59.05%)
- Valid Votes (Ratio): 138,135 ()
- Invalid Votes (Ratio): 2,282 ()

No.	Candidate	Party	Votes	Ratio	Elected
1	Michael Tsai	Democratic Progressive Party	53,471	38.71%	
2	Tsai Chin-lung (蔡錦隆)	Kuomintang	84,664	61.29%	Yes

=== Taichung City Constituency 2 ===
- Eligible voters: 282,102
- Total votes cast (Ratio): 169,912 (60.23%)
- Valid Votes (Ratio): 167,960 ()
- Invalid Votes (Ratio): 1,952 ()

No.	Candidate	Party	Votes	Ratio	Elected
1	Yong Zong Li (楊宗澧)	Third Society Party	791	0.47%	
2	Shen Chih-hwei (沈智慧)	Independent	10,714	6.38%	
3	Hsieh Ming-yuan	Democratic Progressive Party	60,582	36.07%	
4	Lu Shiow-yen	Kuomintang	95,873	57.08%	Yes

=== Taichung City Constituency 3 ===
- Eligible voters: 236,692
- Total votes cast (Ratio): 140,738 (59.46%)
- Valid Votes (Ratio): 138,784 ()
- Invalid Votes (Ratio): 1,954 ()

No.	Candidate	Party	Votes	Ratio	Elected
1	He Zih Hua (賀姿華)	Independent	1,673	1.21%	
2	Ho Min-hao	Democratic Progressive Party	59,969	43.21%	
3	Lin Jhen Dong (林振東)	Democratic Freedom Party (民主自由黨)	611	0.44%	
4	Wang Ming Jiang (王名江)	Dadao Compassion Jishih Party (大道慈悲濟世黨)	322	0.23%	
5	Daniel Huang (黃義交)	Kuomintang (People First Party)	76,209	54.91%	Yes

== Chiayi City ==
- Eligible voters: 198,751
- Total votes cast (Ratio): 114,025 (57.37%)
- Valid Votes (Ratio): 113,003 ()
- Invalid Votes (Ratio): 1,022 ()

No.	Candidate	Party	Votes	Ratio	Elected
1	Ling Zih Chu (凌子楚)	Taiwan Solidarity Union	14,273	12.63%	
2	Chiang Yi-hsiung (江義雄)	Kuomintang	52,774	46.70%	Yes
3	Jhuang Huo Zih (莊和子)	Democratic Progressive Party	45,293	40.08%	
4	Lin Ruei Sia (林瑞霞)	Green Party Taiwan	663	0.59%	

== Tainan City ==
=== Tainan City Constituency 1 ===
- Eligible voters: 290,415
- Total votes cast (Ratio): 175,226 (60.34%)
- Valid Votes (Ratio): 173,023 ()
- Invalid Votes (Ratio): 2,203 ()

No.	Candidate	Party	Votes	Ratio	Elected
1	Chen Ting-fei	Democratic Progressive Party	86,983	50.27%	Yes
2	Wang Yu-ting (王昱婷)	Kuomintang	86,040	49.73%	

=== Tainan City Constituency 2 ===
- Eligible voters: 281,576
- Total votes cast (Ratio): 172,846 (61.39%)
- Valid Votes (Ratio): 170,738 ()
- Invalid Votes (Ratio): 2,108 ()

No.	Candidate	Party	Votes	Ratio	Elected
1	Kao Su-po	Kuomintang	82,566	48.36%	
2	William Lai	Democratic Progressive Party	88,172	51.64%	Yes

== Taipei County ==
=== Taipei County Constituency 1 ===
- Eligible voters:
- Total votes cast (Ratio):
- Valid Votes (Ratio):
- Invalid Votes (Ratio):

No.	Candidate	Party	Votes	Ratio	Elected
1	Wang Tian Yu (王天裕)	Home Party	242	0.17%	
2	Jhuang Meng Syue (莊孟學)	Taiwan Solidarity Union	1,598	1.12%	
3	Yang Ren Cing (楊仁清)	Hakka Party	325	0.23%	
4	Wu Yu Sheng (吳育昇)	Kuomintang	82,949	58.39%	Yes
5	Li Sian Rong (李顯榮)	Democratic Progressive Party	56,594	39.83%	
6	Wu Jin Chih (吳金治)	Third Society Party	366	0.26%	

=== Taipei County Constituency 2 ===
- Eligible voters:
- Total votes cast (Ratio):
- Valid Votes (Ratio):
- Invalid Votes (Ratio):

No.	Candidate	Party	Votes	Ratio	Elected
1	Lin Chih-chia	Taiwan Solidarity Union	8,242	6.01%	
2	Lin Shu-fen	Democratic Progressive Party	59,225	43.16%	Yes
3	Ko Shu-min	Kuomintang (People First Party)	54,774	39.93%	
4	Yang Lian Fu (楊蓮福)	Independent	14,948	10.90%	

=== Taipei County Constituency 3 ===
- Eligible voters:
- Total votes cast (Ratio):
- Valid Votes (Ratio):
- Invalid Votes (Ratio):

No.	Candidate	Party	Votes	Ratio	Elected
1	Chu Chun-hsiao (朱俊曉)	Kuomintang	73,286	48.25%	
2	Su Cing Yan (蘇卿彥)	Independent	767	0.50%	
3	Yu Tian	Democratic Progressive Party	75,212	49.52%	Yes
4	Liu Yi-te	Taiwan Solidarity Union	1,645	1.08%	
5	Liou Ying Ruei (劉英芮)	Home Party	990	0.65%	

=== Taipei County Constituency 4 ===
- Eligible voters:
- Total votes cast (Ratio):
- Valid Votes (Ratio):
- Invalid Votes (Ratio):

No.	Candidate	Party	Votes	Ratio	Elected
1	Lee Hung-chun	Kuomintang (People First Party)	77,122	51.74%	Yes
2	Jheng Yu Hao (鄭余豪)	Taiwan Solidarity Union	969	0.65%	
3	Wu Ping-jui (吳秉叡)	Democratic Progressive Party	70,265	47.13%	
4	Syu Wun Yan (徐文彥)	Green Party Taiwan	721	0.48%	

=== Taipei County Constituency 5 ===
- Eligible voters:
- Total votes cast (Ratio):
- Valid Votes (Ratio):
- Invalid Votes (Ratio):

No.	Candidate	Party	Votes	Ratio	Elected
1	Wun Bing Yuan (溫炳原)	Green Party Taiwan	507	0.43%	
2	Chen Cheng Jyun (陳誠鈞)	Independent	154	0.13%	
3	Wang Wun Siou (王文秀)	Home Party	338	0.29%	
4	Huang Chih-hsiung	Kuomintang	61,948	52.32%	Yes
5	Liao Pen-yen	Democratic Progressive Party	55,444	46.83%	

=== Taipei County Constituency 6 ===
- Eligible voters:
- Total votes cast (Ratio):
- Valid Votes (Ratio):
- Invalid Votes (Ratio):

No.	Candidate	Party	Votes	Ratio	Elected
1	Wang Shu-hui	Democratic Progressive Party	51,775	42.66%	
2	Lin Hung-chih	Kuomintang	69,097	56.94%	Yes
3	Lin Ying Song (林景松)	World Peace Party (世界和平黨)	489	0.40%	

=== Taipei County Constituency 7 ===
- Eligible voters:
- Total votes cast (Ratio):
- Valid Votes (Ratio):
- Invalid Votes (Ratio):

No.	Candidate	Party	Votes	Ratio	Elected
1	Chuang Suo-hang	Democratic Progressive Party	49,008	41.61%	
2	Lin Shu Huei (林淑慧)	Third Society Party	1,436	1.22%	
3	Lin Yu Ren (林育任)	Taiwan Solidarity Union	1,583	1.34%	
4	Wu Chin-chih	Kuomintang (People First Party)	65,752	55.83%	Yes

=== Taipei County Constituency 8 ===
- Eligible voters:
- Total votes cast (Ratio):
- Valid Votes (Ratio):
- Invalid Votes (Ratio):

No.	Candidate	Party	Votes	Ratio	Elected
1	Chang Ching-chung (張慶忠)	Kuomintang	94,785	59.55%	Yes
2	Gan Jyun Rong (甘郡榮)	Independent	1,255	0.79%	
3	Eugene Jao	Democratic Progressive Party	63,123	39.66%	

=== Taipei County Constituency 9 ===
- Eligible voters:
- Total votes cast (Ratio):
- Valid Votes (Ratio):
- Invalid Votes (Ratio):

No.	Candidate	Party	Votes	Ratio	Elected
1	Yang Si Jhou (楊錫周)	Taiwan Constitution Association	338	0.24%	
2	Chou Ni-an (周倪安)	Taiwan Solidarity Union	15,669	11.06%	
3	Hong Yi Ping (洪一平)	Independent	27,044	19.09%	
4	Lin Te-fu	Kuomintang	98,634	69.61%	Yes

=== Taipei County Constituency 10 ===
- Eligible voters:
- Total votes cast (Ratio):
- Valid Votes (Ratio):
- Invalid Votes (Ratio):

No.	Candidate	Party	Votes	Ratio	Elected
1	Lu Chia-chen	Kuomintang	77,656	60.11%	Yes
2	Li Huei Sian (李恢先)	Home Party	669	0.52%	
3	Lee Wen-chung	Democratic Progressive Party	50,869	39.37%	

=== Taipei County Constituency 11 ===
- Eligible voters:
- Total votes cast (Ratio):
- Valid Votes (Ratio):
- Invalid Votes (Ratio):

No.	Candidate	Party	Votes	Ratio	Elected
1	Ge Jhang Yi (葛彰台)	Independent	246	0.16%	
2	Chen Yung-fu (陳永福)	Democratic Progressive Party	43,580	28.76%	
3	Lin Mei Siou (林美秀)	Taiwan Farmers' Party	696	0.46%	
4	Syu Mei Yin (許玫茵)	Home Party	1,390	0.92%	
5	Lo Ming-tsai	Kuomintang	105,601	69.70%	Yes

=== Taipei County Constituency 12 ===
- Eligible voters:
- Total votes cast (Ratio):
- Valid Votes (Ratio):
- Invalid Votes (Ratio):

No.	Candidate	Party	Votes	Ratio	Elected
1	Chen Tsiao-long	Democratic Progressive Party	46,590	38.25%	
2	Siao Jhen Min (蕭振珉)	Taiwan Constitution Association	573	0.47%	
3	Liao Syue Guang (廖學廣)	Independent	11,348	9.32%	
4	Lee Ching-hua	Kuomintang	63,297	51.96%	Yes

== Taoyuan County ==
=== Taoyuan County Constituency 1 ===
- Eligible voters:
- Total votes cast (Ratio):
- Valid Votes (Ratio):
- Invalid Votes (Ratio):

No.	Candidate	Party	Votes	Ratio	Elected
1	Chen Ken-te (陳根德)	Kuomintang	75,973	61.76%	Yes
2	Chen Jhih Ming (陳志明)	Hakka Party	647	0.53%	
3	Lee Chen-nan	Democratic Progressive Party	45,257	36.80%	
4	Yao Yi Jyun (姚毅君)	Third Society Party	1,118	0.91%	

=== Taoyuan County Constituency 2 ===
- Eligible voters:
- Total votes cast (Ratio):
- Valid Votes (Ratio):
- Invalid Votes (Ratio):

No.	Candidate	Party	Votes	Ratio	Elected
1	Kuo Jung-tsung	Democratic Progressive Party	58,577	44.91%	
2	Liao Cheng-ching (廖正井)	Kuomintang	71,174	54.57%	Yes
3	Cai Yang Ru Song (蔡楊如松)	Taiwan Farmers' Party	672	0.52%	

=== Taoyuan County Constituency 3 ===
- Eligible voters:
- Total votes cast (Ratio):
- Valid Votes (Ratio):
- Invalid Votes (Ratio):

No.	Candidate	Party	Votes	Ratio	Elected
1	John Wu	Kuomintang	85,821	63.22%	Yes
2	Peng Tien-fu	Democratic Progressive Party	49,305	36.32%	
3	Jhang Ming Song (張明松)	Hakka Party	618	0.46%	

=== Taoyuan County Constituency 4 ===
- Eligible voters:
- Total votes cast (Ratio):
- Valid Votes (Ratio):
- Invalid Votes (Ratio):

No.	Candidate	Party	Votes	Ratio	Elected
1	Yang Li-huan (楊麗環)	Kuomintang	80,769	62.43%	Yes
2	Huang Chung-yuan	Democratic Progressive Party	47,966	37.07%	
3	Cai Pei Yi (蔡佩宜)	Home Party	645	0.50%	

=== Taoyuan County Constituency 5 ===
- Eligible voters:
- Total votes cast (Ratio):
- Valid Votes (Ratio):
- Invalid Votes (Ratio):

No.	Candidate	Party	Votes	Ratio	Elected
1	Liou Jyun Yi (劉俊儀)	Independent	6,214	4.97%	
2	Huang Jia Hua (黃嘉華)	Taiwan Constitution Association	382	0.31%	
3	Chu Fong-chi	Kuomintang	79,671	63.77%	Yes
4	Li Yue Cin (李月琴)	Democratic Progressive Party	38,671	30.95%	

=== Taoyuan County Constituency 6 ===
- Eligible voters:
- Total votes cast (Ratio):
- Valid Votes (Ratio):
- Invalid Votes (Ratio):

No.	Candidate	Party	Votes	Ratio	Elected
1	Yao Ji Hong (姚吉鴻)	Taiwan Solidarity Union	3,147	2.57%	
2	Chiu Chuang-liang	Democratic Progressive Party	39,660	32.40%	
3	Sun Ta-chien (孫大千)	Kuomintang	79,593	65.03%	Yes

== Hsinchu City ==
- Eligible voters:
- Total votes cast (Ratio):
- Valid Votes (Ratio):
- Invalid Votes (Ratio):

No.	Candidate	Party	Votes	Ratio	Elected
1	Hsu Hsin-ying	Independent	60,209	31.32%	
2	Yu Yu Chih (余玉池)	Hakka Party	4,152	2.16%	
3	Chiu Ching-chun	Kuomintang	127,892	66.52%	Yes

== Miaoli County ==
=== Miaoli County Constituency 1 ===
- Eligible voters:
- Total votes cast (Ratio):
- Valid Votes (Ratio):
- Invalid Votes (Ratio):

No.	Candidate	Party	Votes	Ratio	Elected
1	Tu Wen-ching	Democratic Progressive Party	46905	41.98%	
2	Lee Yi-ting	Kuomintang	64817	58.02%	Yes

=== Miaoli County Constituency 2 ===
- Eligible voters:
- Total votes cast (Ratio):
- Valid Votes (Ratio):
- Invalid Votes (Ratio):

No.	Candidate	Party	Votes	Ratio	Elected
1	Ho Chih-hui (何智輝)	Kuomintang	48290	38.07%	
2	Guo Yu Jhih (郭玉枝)	Hakka Party	975	0.77%	
3	Jhuang Yan (莊嚴)	Democratic Freedom Party (民主自由黨)	474	0.37%	
4	Jhan Yun Si (詹運喜)	Democratic Progressive Party	18905	14.90%	
5	Lai Jin Ming (賴金明)	Dadao Compassion Jishih Party (大道慈悲濟世黨)	335	0.26%	
6	Hsu Yao-chang	Kuomintang	57880	45.63%	Yes

== Taichung County ==
=== Taichung County Constituency 1 ===
- Eligible voters:
- Total votes cast (Ratio):
- Valid Votes (Ratio):
- Invalid Votes (Ratio):

No.	Candidate	Party	Votes	Ratio	Elected
1	Tsai Chi-chang	Democratic Progressive Party	51624	46.40%	
2	Liu Chuan-chung	Kuomintang	59632	53.60%	Yes

=== Taichung County Constituency 2 ===
- Eligible voters:
- Total votes cast (Ratio):
- Valid Votes (Ratio):
- Invalid Votes (Ratio):

No.	Candidate	Party	Votes	Ratio	Elected
1	Li Shun Liang (李順涼)	Independent	14611	10.51%	
2	Liu Jui-long (劉瑞龍)	Democratic Progressive Party	41093	29.55%	
3	Yen Ching-piao	Non-Partisan Solidarity Union	83349	59.94%	Yes

=== Taichung County Constituency 3 ===
- Eligible voters:
- Total votes cast (Ratio):
- Valid Votes (Ratio):
- Invalid Votes (Ratio):

No.	Candidate	Party	Votes	Ratio	Elected
1	Chiang Lien-fu (江連福)	Kuomintang	75563	54.96%	Yes
2	Tony Jian	Democratic Progressive Party	61927	45.04%	

=== Taichung County Constituency 4 ===
- Eligible voters:
- Total votes cast (Ratio):
- Valid Votes (Ratio):
- Invalid Votes (Ratio):

No.	Candidate	Party	Votes	Ratio	Elected
1	Gao Ji Zan (高基讚)	Taiwan Solidarity Union	38368	36.00%	
2	Shyu Jong-shyong	Kuomintang	68216	64.00%	Yes

=== Taichung County Constituency 5 ===
- Eligible voters:
- Total votes cast (Ratio):
- Valid Votes (Ratio):
- Invalid Votes (Ratio):

No.	Candidate	Party	Votes	Ratio	Elected
1	Yang Chiung-ying	Kuomintang	72270	57.69%	Yes
2	Kuo Chun-ming	Democratic Progressive Party	53012	42.31%	

== Changhua County ==
=== Changhua County Constituency 1 ===
- Eligible voters:
- Total votes cast (Ratio):
- Valid Votes (Ratio):
- Invalid Votes (Ratio):

No.	Candidate	Party	Votes	Ratio	Elected
1	Chen Hsiu-ching	Kuomintang	67236	44.96%	Yes
2	Ke Jin De (柯金德)	Democratic Progressive Party	31516	21.08%	
3	Chen Chin-ting	Non-Partisan Solidarity Union	50771	33.96%	

=== Changhua County Constituency 2 ===
- Eligible voters:
- Total votes cast (Ratio):
- Valid Votes (Ratio):
- Invalid Votes (Ratio):

No.	Candidate	Party	Votes	Ratio	Elected
1	Chiu Chuang-chin	Democratic Progressive Party	47809	36.85%	
2	Lin Tsang-min (林滄敏)	Kuomintang	77871	60.03%	Yes
3	Lin Jhao Peng (林招膨)	Taiwan Solidarity Union	4047	3.12%	

=== Changhua County Constituency 3 ===
- Eligible voters:
- Total votes cast (Ratio):
- Valid Votes (Ratio):
- Invalid Votes (Ratio):

No.	Candidate	Party	Votes	Ratio	Elected
1	Cheng Ru-fen (鄭汝芬)	Kuomintang	68486	45.34%	Yes
2	Yang Chung-tse	Independent	35989	23.82%	
3	Lin Chung-mo (林重謨)	Democratic Progressive Party	46595	30.84%	

=== Changhua County Constituency 4 ===
- Eligible voters:
- Total votes cast (Ratio):
- Valid Votes (Ratio):
- Invalid Votes (Ratio):

No.	Candidate	Party	Votes	Ratio	Elected
1	Chen Chao Rong (陳朝容)	Independent	20690	14.00%	
2	Sie Jhang Jie (謝章捷)	Independent	11302	7.65%	
3	Charles Chiang	Democratic Progressive Party	54808	37.09%	
4	Hsiao Ying-tien (蕭景田)	Kuomintang	60980	41.26%	Yes

== Nantou ==
=== Nantou County Constituency 1 ===
- Eligible voters:
- Total votes cast (Ratio):
- Valid Votes (Ratio):
- Invalid Votes (Ratio):

No.	Candidate	Party	Votes	Ratio	Elected
1	Wu Den-yih	Kuomintang	64295	67.12%	Yes
2	Lin Yun-sheng	Democratic Progressive Party	31489	32.88%	

=== Nantou County Constituency 2 ===
- Eligible voters:
- Total votes cast (Ratio):
- Valid Votes (Ratio):
- Invalid Votes (Ratio):

No.	Candidate	Party	Votes	Ratio	Elected
1	Lin Ming-chen	Kuomintang	62344	57.93%	Yes
2	Tang Huo-shen	Democratic Progressive Party	44397	41.26%	
3	Chen Cuei Rong (陳翠容)	Dadao Compassion Jishih Party (大道慈悲濟世黨)	873	0.81%	

== Yunlin County ==
=== Yunlin County Constituency 1 ===
- Eligible voters:
- Total votes cast (Ratio):
- Valid Votes (Ratio):
- Invalid Votes (Ratio):

No.	Candidate	Party	Votes	Ratio	Elected
1	Huang Shan Gu (黃山谷)	Green Party Taiwan	779	0.51%	
2	Cai Huan Sheng (蔡桓生)	Independent	1468	1.07%	
3	Chang Chia-chun (張嘉郡)	Kuomintang	86571	56.24%	Yes
4	Chen Hsien-chung	Democratic Progressive Party	64921	42.18%	

=== Yunlin County Constituency 2 ===
- Eligible voters:
- Total votes cast (Ratio):
- Valid Votes (Ratio):
- Invalid Votes (Ratio):

No.	Candidate	Party	Votes	Ratio	Elected
1	Yin Ling Ying (尹伶瑛)	Independent	17282	10.73%	
2	Chang Sho-wen	Kuomintang	79138	49.11%	Yes
3	Huang Guo Hua (黃國華)	Taiwan Constitution Association	499	0.31%	
4	Jhang Hun Huang (張昆煌)	Dadao Compassion Jishih Party (大道慈悲濟世黨)	454	0.28%	
5	Liao Guei Ru (廖珪如)	Third Society Party	2055	1.28%	
6	Liu Chien-kuo	Democratic Progressive Party	61703	38.29%	

== Chiayi County ==
=== Chiayi County Constituency 1 ===
- Eligible voters:
- Total votes cast (Ratio):
- Valid Votes (Ratio):
- Invalid Votes (Ratio):

No.	Candidate	Party	Votes	Ratio	Elected
1	Tsai Chi-fang (蔡啟芳)	Democratic Progressive Party	55,860	42.53%	
2	Wong Chung-chung	Kuomintang	75,489	57.47%	Yes

=== Chiayi County Constituency 2 ===
- Eligible voters:
- Total votes cast (Ratio):
- Valid Votes (Ratio):
- Invalid Votes (Ratio):

No.	Candidate	Party	Votes	Ratio	Elected
1	Helen Chang	Democratic Progressive Party	65,192	57.06%	Yes
2	Huang Mao (黃茂)	Taiwan Constitution Association	940	0.82%	
3	Tu Wun Sheng (涂文生)	Kuomintang	48,131	42.12%	

== Tainan County ==
=== Tainan County Constituency 1 ===
- Eligible voters:
- Total votes cast (Ratio):
- Valid Votes (Ratio):
- Invalid Votes (Ratio):

No.	Candidate	Party	Votes	Ratio	Elected
1	Yeh Yi-jin (葉宜津)	Democratic Progressive Party	83909	54.58%	Yes
2	Chen Jyun Lun (陳俊倫)	Civil Party	1048	0.68%	
3	Hong Yu Cin (洪玉欽)	Kuomintang	68796	44.74%	

=== Tainan County Constituency 2 ===
- Eligible voters:
- Total votes cast (Ratio):
- Valid Votes (Ratio):
- Invalid Votes (Ratio):

No.	Candidate	Party	Votes	Ratio	Elected
1	Lee Ho-shun	Non-Partisan Solidarity Union	65601	40.83%	
2	Huang Wei-cher	Democratic Progressive Party	95061	59.17%	Yes

=== Tainan County Constituency 3 ===
- Eligible voters:
- Total votes cast (Ratio):
- Valid Votes (Ratio):
- Invalid Votes (Ratio):

No.	Candidate	Party	Votes	Ratio	Elected
1	Wu Chien-pao	Kuomintang	76285	47.34%	
2	Lee Chun-yee	Democratic Progressive Party	84873	52.66%	Yes

== Kaohsiung County ==
=== Kaohsiung County Constituency 1 ===
- Eligible voters:
- Total votes cast (Ratio):
- Valid Votes (Ratio):
- Invalid Votes (Ratio):

No.	Candidate	Party	Votes	Ratio	Elected
1	Chung Shao-he	Kuomintang (People First Party)	72309	53.56%	Yes
2	Chiang Chia-sheng (江嘉盛)	Civil Party	1025	0.76%	
3	Yen Wen-chang	Democratic Progressive Party	61679	45.68%	

=== Kaohsiung County Constituency 2 ===
- Eligible voters:
- Total votes cast (Ratio):
- Valid Votes (Ratio):
- Invalid Votes (Ratio):

No.	Candidate	Party	Votes	Ratio	Elected
1	Liou Jheng Wei (劉政瑋)	Taiwan Farmers' Party	3250	2.12%	
2	Yu Cheng-hsien	Democratic Progressive Party	65257	42.61%	
3	Lin Yi-shih	Kuomintang	84659	55.27%	Yes

=== Kaohsiung County Constituency 3 ===
- Eligible voters:
- Total votes cast (Ratio):
- Valid Votes (Ratio):
- Invalid Votes (Ratio):

No.	Candidate	Party	Votes	Ratio	Elected
1	Chen Chi-yu (陳啟昱)	Democratic Progressive Party	55848	45.13%	Yes
2	Huang Sian Nan (黃憲南)	Independent	317	0.26%	
3	Wu Kuang-hsun	Kuomintang	53205	43.00%	
4	Syu Cing Huang (徐慶煌)	Independent	13158	10.64%	
5	Jian Hong De (簡宏德)	Taiwan Farmers' Party	996	0.81%	
6	Jian Jia Hong (簡家弘)	Independent	199	0.16%	

=== Kaohsiung County Constituency 4 ===
- Eligible voters:
- Total votes cast (Ratio):
- Valid Votes (Ratio):
- Invalid Votes (Ratio):

No.	Candidate	Party	Votes	Ratio	Elected
1	Chen Ming Jheng (陳明政)	Third Society Party	204	0.14%	
2	Wu Long Jie (吳隆傑)	Taiwan Solidarity Union	1095	0.74%	
3	Zhang Mei Sian (張美嫻)	Civil Party	266	0.18%	
4	Yang Dong Jie (楊東杰)	Taiwan Farmers' Party	377	0.26%	
5	Lin Tai-hua	Democratic Progressive Party	71450	48.46%	
6	Chiang Ling-chun (江玲君)	Kuomintang	74062	50.22%	Yes

== Pingtung County ==
=== Pingtung County Constituency 1 ===
- Eligible voters:
- Total votes cast (Ratio):
- Valid Votes (Ratio):
- Invalid Votes (Ratio):

No.	Candidate	Party	Votes	Ratio	Elected
1	Wang Shu Wei (王樹圍)	Independent	2355	1.74%	
2	Siao Li Ying (蕭立應)	Third Society Party	470	0.35%	
3	Tsai Hau	Independent	58727	43.41%	
4	Lan Cyun Jie (藍群傑)	Independent	6656	4.92%	
5	Su Chen-ching (蘇震清)	Democratic Progressive Party	63453	46.91%	Yes
6	Jhang Huei Yi (張惠怡)	Independent	3617	2.67%	

=== Pingtung County Constituency 2 ===
- Eligible voters:
- Total votes cast (Ratio):
- Valid Votes (Ratio):
- Invalid Votes (Ratio):

No.	Candidate	Party	Votes	Ratio	Elected
1	Li Shih Bin (李世斌)	Democratic Progressive Party	52441	43.17%	
2	Wang Chin-shih (王進士)	Kuomintang	69027	56.83%	Yes

=== Pingtung County Constituency 3 ===
- Eligible voters:
- Total votes cast (Ratio):
- Valid Votes (Ratio):
- Invalid Votes (Ratio):

No.	Candidate	Party	Votes	Ratio	Elected
1	Pan Men-an	Democratic Progressive Party	59896	51.30%	Yes
2	Su Ching-chuan	Kuomintang	50195	43.00%	
3	Jhou Bi Yun (周碧雲)	Independent	6653	5.70%	

== Yilan County ==
- Eligible voters: 336,046
- Total votes cast (Ratio): 181,540 (54.02%)
- Valid Votes (Ratio): 178,744 ()
- Invalid Votes (Ratio): 2,796 ()

No.	Candidate	Party	Votes	Ratio	Elected
1	Chen Chin-te	Democratic Progressive Party	81,984	45.87%	
2	Lin Chien-jung (林建榮)	Kuomintang	94,965	53.13%	Yes
3	Sie Li Jing Yi (謝李靜宜)	Democratic Freedom Party (民主自由黨)	1,795	1.00%	

== Hualien County ==
- Eligible voters: 196,692
- Total votes cast (Ratio): 96,216 (48.92%)
- Valid Votes (Ratio): 94,201 ()
- Invalid Votes (Ratio): 2,015 ()

No.	Candidate	Party	Votes	Ratio	Elected
1	Jhong Bao Jhu (鍾寶珠)	Green Party Taiwan	2,473	2.63%	
2	Lu Po-chi	Democratic Progressive Party	27,207	28.88%	
3	Fu Kun-chi	Kuomintang (People First Party)	62,548	66.40%	Yes
4	He Jhih Hong (何智弘)	Dadao Compassion Jishih Party (大道慈悲濟世黨)	172	0.18%	
5	Jhan Yi Wan (詹益萬)	Home Party	682	0.72%	
6	Jhong Shang Ting (鍾尚廷)	Independent	1,119	1.19%	

== Taitung County ==
- Eligible voters: 119,532
- Total votes cast (Ratio): 58,060 (48.57%)
- Valid Votes (Ratio): 56,952 ()
- Invalid Votes (Ratio): 1,108 ()

No.	Candidate	Party	Votes	Ratio	Elected
1	Syu Jhih Syong (許志雄)	Independent	21,080	37.01%	
2	Justin Huang	Kuomintang	34,794	61.10%	Yes
3	Liou Yun Jhu (劉昀筑)	Hakka Party	1,078	1.89%	

== Penghu County ==
- Eligible voters: 71,368
- Total votes cast (Ratio): 39,181 (54.90%)
- Valid Votes (Ratio): 38,613 ()
- Invalid Votes (Ratio): 568 ()

No.	Candidate	Party	Votes	Ratio	Elected
1	Ou Jhong Kai (歐中慨)	Independent	3,373	8.74%	
2	Huang Jhong Yang (黃中陽)	Dadao Compassion Jishih Party (大道慈悲濟世黨)	300	0.78%	
3	Chen Kuang-fu	Democratic Progressive Party	15,356	39.77%	
4	Lin Pin-kuan	Non-Partisan Solidarity Union	19,584	50.71%	Yes

== Kinmen County ==
- Eligible voters: 63,451
- Total votes cast (Ratio): 27,007 (42.56%)
- Valid Votes (Ratio): 26,564 ()
- Invalid Votes (Ratio): 443 ()

No.	Candidate	Party	Votes	Ratio	Elected
1	Chen Fu-hai	Independent	9,912	37.31%	Yes
2	Lee Wo-shih	Independent	5,274	19.85%	
3	Gao Sian Teng (高絃騰)	Civil Party	39	0.15%	
4	Hu Wei Sheng (胡偉生)	Independent	1,070	4.03%	
5	Tang Huei Pei (唐惠霈)	Democratic Progressive Party	431	1.62%	
6	Wu Cherng-dean	Kuomintang (New Party Endorsement)	9,838	37.04%	

== Lienchiang County ==
- Eligible voters: 7,665
- Total votes cast (Ratio): 4,461 (58.20%)
- Valid Votes (Ratio): 4,388 ()
- Invalid Votes (Ratio): 73 ()

No.	Candidate	Party	Votes	Ratio	Elected
1	Cao Cheng Di (曹成俤)	Democratic Progressive Party	142	3.24%	
2	Lin Hui-kuan	People First Party	2,064	47.04%	
3	Tsao Erh-chung	Kuomintang	2,182	49.72%	Yes

== Lowland Aborigines ==
- Eligible voters: 156,052
- Total votes cast (Ratio): 66,908 (42.88%)
- Valid Votes (Ratio): 65,522 ()
- Invalid Votes (Ratio): 1,386 ()

No.	Candidate	Party	Votes	Ratio	Elected
1	Lin Cheng-er (林正二)	People First Party	11,925	18.20%	Yes
2	Liao Kuo-tung	Kuomintang	20,156	30.77%	Yes
3	Song Jin Cai (宋進財)	Independent	10,662	16.27%	
4	Chen Hsiu-hui	Democratic Progressive Party	5,710	8.71%	
5	Yang Jen-fu	Kuomintang	17,069	26.05%	Yes

== Highland Aborigines ==
- Eligible voters: 167,020
- Total votes cast (Ratio): 86,093 (51.55%)
- Valid Votes (Ratio): 84,358 ()
- Invalid Votes (Ratio): 1,735 ()

No.	Candidate	Party	Votes	Ratio	Elected
1	Syue Yi Jhen (薛宜蓁)	Civil Party	443	0.53%	
2	Kung Wen-chi (孔文吉)	Kuomintang	22,391	26.54%	Yes
3	Chien Tung-ming	Kuomintang	22,659	26.86%	Yes
4	Hou Jin Jhu (侯金助)	Democratic Progressive Party	4,420	5.24%	
5	Kao Chin Su-mei	Non-Partisan Solidarity Union	20,012	23.72%	Yes
6	Lin Chun-te	People First Party	14,265	16.91%	
7	Song Ren Huo (宋仁和)	Taiwan Constitution Association	168	0.20%	

== See also ==
- 2008 Taiwanese legislative election
- Seventh Legislative Yuan
