= Changhua County Constituency 3 =

Constituency of the Legislative Yuan of Taiwan

- Single-member constituency for the Legislative Yuan
- District(s): Fangyuan, Erlin, Puyan, Xihu, Puxin, Dacheng, Zhutang, Pitou, Beidou, Xizhou
- Electorate: 267,187 (2024 election)

Current constituency
- Created: 2008
- Party: KMT
- Member: Hsieh Yi-fong

Changhua County Constituency 3 (Chinese: 彰化縣第三選舉區) is one of the 73 regional constituencies represented in the Legislative Yuan, the national legislature of Taiwan. It was created in 2008 following a series of constitutional reforms, and elects one legislator, through first-past-the-post voting, to the Legislative Yuan. It has been represented by Hsieh Yi-fong of the Kuomintang since 2020.

== Legislators ==
Election	Legislator	Party
2008 - 2016	Cheng Ru-fen	Kuomintang
2016 - 2020	Hung Tsung-yi	Democratic Progressive Party
2020	Hsieh Yi-fong	Kuomintang

== Election results ==

=== 2008 ===
2008 Taiwanese legislative election: Changhua 3
Candidate	Party	Votes	%
Cheng Ru-fen	Kuomintang	68,486	45.33
Lin Chung-mo	Democratic Progressive Party	46,595	30.84
Yang Chung-tse	Independent	35,989	23.82
Total		151,070	100.00
Valid votes		151,070	98.05
Invalid/blank votes		3,010	1.95
Total votes		154,080	100.00
Registered voters/turnout		266,929	57.72
Majority		21,891	14.49
Kuomintang win (new seat)			

=== 2012 ===
* denotes the incumbent legislator

2012 Taiwanese legislative election: Changhua 3
Candidate	Party	Votes	%	+/–
Cheng Ru-fen*	Kuomintang	101,352	55.90	▲10.57
Charles Chiang	Democratic Progressive Party	79,969	44.10	▲13.26
Total		181,321	100.00	–
Valid votes		181,321	96.34	
Invalid/blank votes		6,885	3.66	
Total votes		188,206	100.00	
Registered voters/turnout		269,777	69.76	
Majority		21,383	11.8	
Kuomintang hold				

=== 2016 ===
* denotes the incumbent legislator

2016 Taiwanese legislative election: Changhua 3
Candidate	Party	Votes	%	+/–
Hung Tsung-yi	Democratic Progressive Party	75,609	44.58	▲0.48
Cheng Ru-fen*	Kuomintang	69,448	40.95	▼14.95
Chen Chao-jung	People First Party	19,287	11.37	NEW
Chang I-sheng	New Power Party	3,229	1.90	NEW
Hung Yu-chiang	Free Taiwan Party	2,012	1.19	NEW
Total		169,585	100.00	–
Valid votes		169,585	97.72	
Invalid/blank votes		3,955	2.28	
Total votes		173,540	100.00	
Registered voters/turnout		270,227	64.22	
Majority		6,161	3.63	
Democratic Progressive Party gain from Kuomintang				

=== 2020 ===
* denotes the incumbent legislator

2020 Taiwanese legislative election: Changhua 3
Candidate	Party	Votes	%	+/–
Hsieh Yi-fong	Kuomintang	97,396	51.15	▲10.20
Hung Tsung-yi*	Democratic Progressive Party	83,380	43.79	▼0.79
Yang Li-hsiang	Independent	8,518	4.47	NEW
Lin Yin-tsung	Sovereign State for Formosa & Pescadores Party	1,116	0.59	NEW
Total		190,410	100.00	–
Valid votes		190,410	97.68	
Invalid/blank votes		4,525	2.32	
Total votes		194,935	100.00	
Registered voters/turnout		270,719	72.01	
Majority		14,016	7.36	
Kuomintang gain from Democratic Progressive Party				

=== 2024 ===
* denotes the incumbent legislator

2024 Taiwanese legislative election: Changhua 3
Candidate	Party	Votes	%	+/–
Hsieh Yi-fong*	Kuomintang	97,681	53.75	▲2.60
Wu Yin-ning	Democratic Progressive Party	78,473	43.18	▼0.61
Hung Chien-hsing	Independent	4,908	2.70	NEW
Kuei Li-na	Chinese Unification Promotion Party	683	0.38	NEW
Total		181,745	100.00	–
Valid votes		181,745	97.40	
Invalid/blank votes		4,852	2.60	
Total votes		186,597	100.00	
Registered voters/turnout		267,187	69.84	
Majority		19,208	10.57	
Kuomintang hold				
