= Diane Lee =

Taiwanese politician

Lee Ching-an MLY
- 李慶安
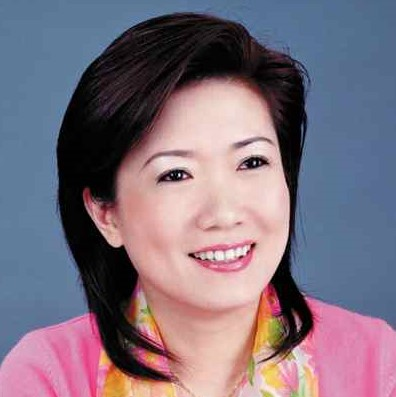

Member of the Legislative Yuan
- In office 1 February 2008 – 8 January 2009
- Succeeded by: Chiang Nai-shin
- Constituency: Taipei 6th
- In office 1 February 1999 – 31 January 2008
- Preceded by: multi-member district
- Succeeded by: Justin Chou
- Constituency: Taipei 2nd

Personal details
- Born: 17 January 1959 (age 67) Taipei, Taiwan
- Party: Independent (2008–present)
- Other political affiliations: People First Party (2000–2006); Kuomintang (before 2000; 2006–2008)
- Relations: Lee Ching-hua (brother)
- Parent: Lee Huan (father)
- Education: National Chengchi University (BA); University of Maryland, College Park (MA)

Lee Ching-an (Chinese: 李慶安; born 17 January 1959), also known by her English name Diane Lee, is a Taiwanese former politician. She naturalized as a U.S. citizen in 1991, but later relinquished U.S. citizenship. Lee, a Kuomintang member, held elected public office in Taiwan from 1994 to 2009, first as a Taipei City Councilwoman and then for three terms as a legislator representing Daan District, Taipei City.

== Early life and education ==
Lee is the youngest of four children born to Lee Huan and Pan Hsiang-ning. Her two brothers are Lee Ching-chung and Lee Ching-hua. Lee Ching-chu is her older sister. She graduated from National Chengchi University with a bachelor's degree in journalism then earned a master's degree in mass communications from the University of Maryland, College Park, in the United States.

== Political career ==
On 28 March 2001, Lee was assaulted by notorious organized criminal and legislator Lo Fu-chu during a meeting of the Legislative Yuan's Education and Culture Committee, after she implied that he had attempted to interfere with the selection of board members for a public educational institution that was experiencing a corruption scandal and called him a "gangster".

Lo originally denied that he had assaulted Lee, until a video of the incident (which Lo did not know existed) was shown on Taiwanese television. Lee was hospitalized following the incident with a slight concussion. The resulting scandal virtually ended Lo's political career. She charged him with assault, but later reached a settlement with him.

The next year, she accused Twu Shiing-jer of assaulting a restaurateur. Lee apologized after the incident, but did not heed calls to resign for the purportedly wrongful accusation against Twu.

=== 2008 legislative election ===
In May 2008, opposition Democratic Progressive Party politicians accused Lee of holding United States citizenship while sitting in the Legislative Yuan after winning the 2008 Republic of China legislative election on 12 January 2008, in contravention of nationality and election laws.

This sparked Taiwan's authorities to inquire with the United States Department of State regarding Lee's nationality status. Lee maintained that she had lost U.S. citizenship automatically upon being sworn in as a Taipei City Councilwoman in 1994. The U.S. Department of State issued a letter to the Ministry of Foreign Affairs in late December 2008 stating that Lee had been previously determined to be a U.S. citizen and issued with a passport and that no request for determination of loss of nationality had been made, but that a determination could be made on presentation of further evidence that an act causing loss of nationality had been performed. A finding of loss of nationality would be retroactive to the date of the aforesaid act. However, amidst rising controversy, she resigned in January 2009.

No.	Candidate	Party	Votes	Ratio	Elected
1	Yue Ke Ming (樂可銘)	Taiwan Constitution Association	89	0.06%	
2	Diane Lee	Kuomintang	99,294	66.80%	Yes
3	Wang Bao Shan (王保善)	Home Party	417	0.28%	
4	Yu Shao Jyun (余少鈞)	Hakka Party	131	0.09%	
5	Luo Wen-jia	Democratic Progressive Party	48,240	32.46%	
6	Gu Wun Fa (古文發)	Democratic Freedom Party (民主自由黨)	155	0.10%	
7	Lin Jyun Sian (林俊賢)	Taiwan Farmers' Party	221	0.15%	
8	Lin Yu Fa (林裕發)	Taiwan Constitution Association	87	0.06%	

On 16 January 2009, the American Institute in Taiwan issued a letter to clarify that under United States nationality law, a person may lose U.S. citizenship by committing certain acts with the intention of losing U.S. citizenship, as long as the person's conduct after the said act is consistent with that of a non-U.S. citizen. Lee's lawyer Lee Yung-jan argued that this supported Lee's earlier statement that she had automatically lost U.S. citizenship upon taking office, and that her subsequent conduct such as travelling to the U.S. on a Republic of China passport instead of a United States passport confirmed her intention to lose citizenship. However, the Central Election Commission revoked Lee's status as an elected official in February 2009. The CEC allowed Lee to keep over NT$8.6 million in election subsidies because the Election and Recall Act for Public Servants did not preclude natural-born dual citizens from running in local elections. Foreign citizenship must only be renounced before the oath of office is administered. Her name appeared in the Internal Revenue Service's Quarterly Publication of Individuals Who Have Chosen to Expatriate in the final quarter of 2009.

In February 2010, Lee was found guilty in the Taipei District Court of fraud and forgery relating to the citizenship issue. She appealed the sentence to the Taiwan High Court, which acquitted her in August 2010. Her case went to the Supreme Court of the Republic of China, which upheld her acquittal.
