= Chen Chao-jung (politician) =

Taiwanese politician

Chen Chao-jung MLY
- 陳朝容

Member of the Legislative Yuan
- In office 1 February 2005 – 31 January 2008
- Constituency: Changhua County
- In office 1 February 1993 – 31 January 2002
- Constituency: Changhua County

Member of the Changhua County Council
- In office 1 March 1982 – 1 March 1990

Personal details
- Born: 25 February 1956 (age 70)
- Party: People First Party (2000–06; 2015–present)
- Other political affiliations: Kuomintang (until 2000; 2006–?)
- Education: Taichung School of Commerce (BS)

Chen Chao-jung (Chinese: 陳朝容; born 25 February 1956) is a Taiwanese politician. He served on the Changhua County Council from 1982 to 1990, and four terms on the Legislative Yuan, first from 1993 to 2002, and again between 2005 and 2008.

== Education ==
Chen attended Pu-yen Elementary and Middle School, graduating from the Affiliated Industrial Vocational High School of National Changhua University of Education. He then earned a degree from the Taichung School of Commerce.

== Political career ==
As a member of the Kuomintang, Chen served on the Changhua County Council from 1982 to 1990. He was elected to two terms on the Legislative Yuan, before switching to the People First Party in 2000. Soon after joining the party, Chen was named the chief executive of the PFP legislative caucus. Chen and other Pan-Blue Coalition figures accused president Chen Shui-bian of having an affair with Hsiao Bi-khim in 2000. As a result, Chen Chao-jung was subsequently suspended. He criticized Taiwan's police force for failing to keep pornography out of the hands of minors in June 2000, and drew attention to increasing rates of identity theft in August, stating that perpetrators were using the stolen information to register for cell phones. He was active in reporting electoral fraud and white-collar crimes, charges which involved the former aide of legislator Tsai Ling-lan and the 2001 legislative campaign of Charles Chiang. Tuan Yi-kang accused an unnamed legislator of selling pirate media in 2001, and, in response Chen sued him for slander. Chen returned to the legislature in 2005, and rejoined the Kuomintang the next year. During that year's Double Ten Day festivities, Chen participated in a protest calling for the resignation of President Chen Shui-bian. In January 2007, Chen Chao-jung and Chen Hsien-chung were involved in a physical altercation on the floor of the Legislative Yuan during a meeting of the Organic Laws and Statutes Committee. In 2016, Chen represented the People First Party in Changhua County's 3rd legislative district.
