= Shen Fu-hsiung =

Taiwanese physician and politician

- 沈富雄
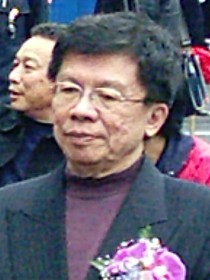
- Shen in February 2006

Member of the Legislative Yuan
- In office 1 February 1999 – 31 January 2005
- Constituency: Taipei 2
- In office 1 February 1996 – 31 January 1999
- Constituency: Taipei 1 (North)
- In office 1 February 1993 – 31 January 1996
- Constituency: Taipei 2 (South)

Personal details
- Born: 23 August 1939 (age 86) Tainan, Tainan Prefecture, Taiwan, Empire of Japan
- Party: Democratic Progressive Party (1992–2007)
- Education: National Taiwan University (MD, PhD); University of California, San Francisco; University of Washington
- Profession: Nephrologist

Shen Fu-hsiung (Chinese: 沈富雄; pinyin: Shěn Fùxióng; born 23 August 1939) is a Taiwanese nephrologist, politician, and political commentator. Known as a maverick in the Democratic Progressive Party, he is nickenamed "Lonely Bird".

== Education, medical career, and activism ==
Born in 1939 in Tainan, Shen earned a medical degree at National Taiwan University before seeking further education in the United States. He left Taiwan for the University of California's San Francisco Medical Center and also spent time at the Mayo Clinic and the University of Washington. He taught at UW from 1974 to 1987 and led the nephrology division at the Veterans Administration Hospital in Seattle between 1982 and 1986. While working in the United States, Shen naturalized as a U.S. citizen. His support of the Taiwan independence movement drew attention from the Kuomintang, which blacklisted him from returning to Taiwan until 1986. He then set up a clinic at Taiwan Adventist Hospital in Taipei. In January 1991, Shen was arrested at Chiang Kai-shek International Airport, where he was arrested for smuggling drugs and weapons into Taiwan. He was found in possession of erythropoietin and charged under provisions of the Law Governing Drugs and Pharmacists. Shen joined a hunger strike led by students of National Taiwan University in April 1991, in support of revisions to the Constitution of the Republic of China that would make new elections for the National Assembly possible. National Assembly elections were eventually scheduled for December 1991.

== Political career ==
Shen chose to run in the 1992 Legislative Yuan elections, and by law was required to relinquish his U.S. citizenship. In November 1993, Shen led a group of Democratic Progressive Party politicians on a junket to the U.S., where they attended to a meeting of the Asian Pacific Economic Community. Shen won reelection in 1995 in part because his party had asked its supporters to vote for legislative candidates based on the season in which voters were born. This marked the first time the DPP had used a vote allocation system and ensured a vote distribution that saw the elections of Shen, Yeh Chu-lan, Huang Tien-fu, and Yen Chin-fu. In the next election cycle, the DPP began incorporating a direct vote into its electoral primaries. Despite the change in format, Shen won again. In 2001, he succeeded Chen Shui-bian as leader of the Justice Alliance faction, and won that year's legislative election by forming an alliance with Chou Po-ya, Lan Mei-chin, Tuan Yi-kang, and Julian Kuo, against Lo Fu-chu. The following year Shen was elected a member of the Democratic Progressive Party's Central Review Committee. Shen's proposed nomination as DPP candidate for Vice President of the Legislative Yuan in 2002 met with heavy opposition from the Taiwan Solidarity Union. As a result, the DPP instead selected Hung Chi-chang, who eventually lost to the Kuomintang nominee Chiang Pin-kung. The DPP's Justice Alliance backed Shen's 2004 reelection bid, which was ultimately unsuccessful.

Prior to stepping down from the Legislative Yuan, Shen had already been named a likely candidate for the Taipei mayoralty in municipal elections scheduled for 2006. Speculation continued to build through 2005. Subsequently, Shen formally announced his mayoral campaign in 2006, becoming the first DPP member to do so, but dropped out in May of that year. Shen was named the fifth legislative candidate on the Democratic Progressive Party's proportional representation party list in May 2007, amid opposition from a group of radio presenters. In October, Shen announced his withdrawal from the DPP, helped found the Third Society Party, and ended his legislative campaign. President Ma Ying-jeou named Shen vice president of the Control Yuan in June 2008. However, Shen was not confirmed in a July 2008 Legislative Yuan vote. Shen declared his candidacy for the Taipei City mayoralty in June 2014, but had dropped out of the race by August.

== Political stances ==
In April 1998, Shen went on a hunger strike, urging the government to pass a bill regarding referendums in Taiwan. Such a law was not enacted until December 2003.

In 1999, the New York Times characterized Shen as supportive of Chen Shui-bian, and during the 2000 presidential election, Shen spoke favorably of him during interviews to the publication. Both were members of the Justice Alliance faction, but by 2001, Shen had said of Chen's presidential administration, "When you're sailing through a storm, the two parties should sit in the middle of the boat, rather than arguing over who sits in the bow and who sits in the stern." Earlier that year, Shen had claimed that many of his constituents preferred for the political status of Taiwan to remain undisturbed, similar to comments Shen had made in 2000, supporting revisions to the articles in the Democratic Progressive Party charter regarding independence.
