= Huang Chien-hui =

Taiwanese politician (born 1956)

- 黃劍輝

Member of the Legislative Yuan
- In office 1 February 2005 – 31 January 2008
- Preceded by: Multi-member district
- Succeeded by: Lin Shu-fen
- Constituency: Taipei County 2

Mayor of Luzhou
- In office 1 March 1998 – 1 March 2002
- Preceded by: Chou Ching-yang
- Succeeded by: Li Weng Yueh-e

Personal details
- Born: 20 May 1965 (age 60) Yunlin County, Taiwan
- Party: Democratic Progressive Party

Huang Chien-hui (Chinese: 黃劍輝; born 20 May 1965) is a Taiwanese lawyer and politician. He was mayor of Luzhou from 1998 to 2002, and a member of the Legislative Yuan between 2005 and 2008. He later led Far Eastern Air Transport during the company’s first bankruptcy proceedings.

== Early life and education ==
Huang had planned to move to Taipei to pursue further education since 1975, when a group of students from the College of Chinese Culture visited his primary school in rural Kouhu, Yunlin. He duly moved to attend middle school in Taipei County's Luzhou, and later completed secondary education at the Affiliated Senior High School of National Taiwan Normal University, where he was vice president and president of the student body. Huang was offered placement into National Taiwan Normal University's Department of Public Administration, but did not consider becoming a teacher. To prepare for the Joint College Entrance Examination, Huang dismantled his bed frame and used late nights as motivation, hoping to secure admission to National Taiwan University. Sleep deprivation and academic pressures led to a low score. However, Huang qualified to study drama at Chinese Culture University. In his second year, Huang sat an internal transfer examination to the College of Law. He considered transferring to National Taiwan University when the opportunity arose, ultimately deciding to remain at CCU on the advice of legal scholar Lin Hsin-ho. Huang earned bachelor's and master's degrees in law at Chinese Culture University in 1989 and 1996, respectively, and later continued his legal education at Duke University. He was an executive at Ning Yuan Attorneys-at-Law.

== Political career ==
Prior to serving on the Legislative Yuan from 2005 to 2008, Huang was a one-term mayor of Luzhou, a post he ran for at the advice of Su Tseng-chang. During his mayoralty, Huang supported an infrastructure project that moved all of the township's piping underground. At the time, local political factions were influential in Luzhou. When he lost reelection, Huang revisited the fortune teller who had predicted the loss with a gift to thank him for an accurate prediction.

In 2005, Huang raised concerns about prosecutorial wiretapping, promoted public health, and commented on scheduling of the National Assembly election. In June 2007, the legislature's Home and Nations Committee considered amendments to the Statute Governing Relations between the Peoples of the Taiwan Area and Mainland Area. Huang said of the proposals, "This is a bill by the Chinese for the Chinese!" During his legislature tenure, Huang worked as a television presenter on Formosa Television, and on Frank Hsieh's 2008 presidential campaign as a spokesperson. The Democratic Progressive Party investigated Huang during the party primaries prior to the 2008 legislative election, due to allegations of interference with telephone polling. Huang later withdrew his candidacy, yielding the nomination to Lin Shu-fen.

After leaving the Legislative Yuan, Huang chaired Far Eastern Air Transport. Unionized employees approached Huang and asked for his guidance as the company navigated bankruptcy, and Huang resigned the position once Far Eastern had restructured. He later served as the spokesperson of the Democratic Progressive Party's Central Executive Committee.
