= Lan Mei-chin =

Taiwanese politician (born 1944)

- 藍美津

Member of the Legislative Yuan
- In office 1 February 2002 – 31 January 2008
- Constituency: Taipei II

Member of the Taipei City Council
- In office 25 December 1985 – 31 January 2002

Personal details
- Born: 7 September 1944 (age 82) Taihoku, Taihoku Prefecture, Taiwan, Empire of Japan
- Party: Democratic Progressive Party
- Spouse: Huang Tien-fu
- Relatives: Huang Hsin-chieh (brother in-law)

Lan Mei-chin (Chinese: 藍美津; pinyin: Lán Měijīn; born 7 September 1944) is a Taiwanese politician. She was elected to the Taipei City Council for the first time in 1985 and served until 2002, when she took office as a member of the Legislative Yuan, where she served until 2008.

== Political career ==
Lan served four terms on the Taipei City Council from 1985 to 2002. She formed an electoral coalition with Shen Fu-hsiung, Tuan Yi-kang, Chou Po-ya, and Julian Kuo in 2001, and won election to the Legislative Yuan. Lan joined the same alliance, which had replaced Chou with Wang Shih-chien, for her 2004 reelection bid.

== Personal life ==
Lan is married to Huang Tien-fu, the younger brother of Huang Hsin-chieh. Their youngest son, Huang Hsiang-chun, has served on the Taipei City Council. Huang Hsin-yi, their youngest child, hung herself in October 2004 in the home she shared with her eldest brother's family. Lan's brother, Lan Shih-tsung, was also a member of the Taipei City Council and Taipei's Department of Civil Affairs director.
