= Tsao Lai-wang =

Taiwanese politician (born 1958)

Tsao Lai-wang (Chinese: 曹來旺; born 1958) is a Taiwanese politician.

Tsao was elected to two terms on the Taipei County Council before serving as a member of the Legislative Yuan between 2005 and 2008. Upon Lien Chan's return from his May 2005 visit to China, Tsao and fellow Democratic Progressive Party legislators Lin Kuo-ching and Charles Chiang went to Chiang Kai-shek International Airport to protest the visit, but were detained by police. In April 2007, Tsao expressed support for the closure of Losheng Sanatorium. The following month, the Taipei Society placed Tsao on its list of failing legislators.
