= 公民黨 =

公民黨 may refer to:

- Civic Party, liberal democratic political party in Hong Kong
- Civil Party (Taiwan), minor political party in the Republic of China on Taiwan
