= Taichung City Constituency 1 =

Constituency of the Legislative Yuan of Taiwan

- Single-member constituency for the Legislative Yuan
- District(s): Dajia, Daan, Waipu, Qingshui, Wuqi
- Electorate: 223,459 (2024 election)

Current constituency
- Created: 2008 (as Taichung County Constituency 1); 2010 (current name)
- Party: DPP
- Member: Tsai Chi-chang

Taichung City Constituency 1 (Chinese: 臺中市第一選舉區) is one of the 73 regional constituencies represented in the Legislative Yuan, the national legislature of Taiwan. It was created in 2008 (as Taichung County Constituency 1) following a series of constitutional reforms, and elects one legislator, through first-past-the-post voting, to the Legislative Yuan. It has been represented by Tsai Chi-chang of the Democratic Progressive Party since 2012.

== Legislators ==
Election	Legislator	Party
2008 - 2012	Liu Chuan-chung	Kuomintang
2012	Tsai Chi-chang	Democratic Progressive Party

== Election results ==

=== 2008 (Note: Named Taichung County Constituency 1, boundaries unchanged) ===
2008 Taiwanese legislative election: Taichung County 1
Candidate	Party	Votes	%
Liu Chuan-chung	Kuomintang	59,632	53.60
Tsai Chi-chang	Democratic Progressive Party	51,624	46.40
Total		111,256	100.00
Valid votes		111,256	97.77
Invalid/blank votes		2,542	2.23
Total votes		113,798	100.00
Registered voters/turnout		197,678	57.57
Majority		8,008	7.2
Kuomintang win (new seat)			

=== 2012 ===
2012 Taiwanese legislative election: Taichung 1
Candidate	Party	Votes	%	+/–
Tsai Chi-chang	Democratic Progressive Party	81,669	54.54	▲8.14
Chen Tien-wang	Kuomintang	65,438	43.70	▼9.90
Wang Hsien-tang	Independent	2,628	1.76	NEW
Total		149,735	100.00	–
Valid votes		149,735	97.86	
Invalid/blank votes		3,280	2.14	
Total votes		153,015	100.00	
Registered voters/turnout		204,803	74.71	
Majority		16,231	10.84	
Democratic Progressive Party gain from Kuomintang				

=== 2016 ===
* denotes the incumbent legislator

2016 Taiwanese legislative election: Taichung 1
Candidate	Party	Votes	%	+/–
Tsai Chi-chang*	Democratic Progressive Party	84,355	60.14	▲5.60
Yen Chiu-yueh	Kuomintang	53,293	37.99	▼5.71
Huang Chin-tui	Independent	1,205	0.86	NEW
Wang Shu-fen	Taiwan Constitution Association	904	0.64	NEW
Chen Chun-yuan	Chinese Unification Promotion Party	510	0.36	NEW
Total		140,267	100.00	–
Valid votes		140,267	98.27	
Invalid/blank votes		2,471	1.73	
Total votes		142,738	100.00	
Registered voters/turnout		211,316	67.55	
Majority		31,062	22.15	
Democratic Progressive Party hold				

=== 2020 ===
* denotes the incumbent legislator

2020 Taiwanese legislative election: Taichung 1
Candidate	Party	Votes	%	+/–
Tsai Chi-chang*	Democratic Progressive Party	106,376	66.69	▲6.55
Lin Chia-hsin	Kuomintang	47,050	29.50	▼8.49
Huang Chao-yuan	People First Party	6,086	3.82	NEW
Total		159,512	100.00	–
Valid votes		159,512	97.77	
Invalid/blank votes		3,632	2.23	
Total votes		163,144	100.00	
Registered voters/turnout		218,024	74.83	
Majority		59,326	37.19	
Democratic Progressive Party hold				

=== 2024 ===
* denotes the incumbent legislator

2024 Taiwanese legislative election: Taichung 1
Candidate	Party	Votes	%	+/–
Tsai Chi-chang*	Democratic Progressive Party	79,884	49.63	▼17.06
Tsai Pi-ru	Taiwan People's Party	72,634	45.13	NEW
Liu Teng-chung	Independent	4,685	2.91	NEW
Lai Hsin-chuan	Independent	3,742	2.33	NEW
Total		160,945	100.00	–
Valid votes		160,945	98.45	
Invalid/blank votes		2,541	1.55	
Total votes		163,486	100.00	
Registered voters/turnout		223,459	73.16	
Majority		7,250	4.5	
Democratic Progressive Party hold				
