= Ko Shu-min =

Taiwanese politician

Ko Shu-min (Chinese: 柯淑敏; born 31 October 1968) is a Taiwanese politician.

== Life and career ==
Ko was raised in Luzhou and attended primary school there, then graduated from Sacred Heart Girls High School. She later attended Chinese Culture University, Concordia University Wisconsin, and Bellevue University.

Ko was a member of the Legislative Yuan for two terms from 2002 to 2008, during which she represented Taipei County 2 on behalf of the People First Party. She was defeated by Lin Shu-fen in the 2008 legislative election. In November 2002, Ko said of Fan Chen-tsung, who was contemplating his resignation as head of the Council of Agriculture, "Although we've had arguments before, I still think that he's one of the few government officials who has the guts to stick up for what he believes." In December 2004, she spoke out against cooperation with the Democratic Progressive Party on a bill regarding party assets. As Ko was preparing to submit revisions to a bill about the three links for clause-by-clause review in May 2006, the document was snatched by legislative colleague Wang Shu-hui, who swallowed it.
