= New Taipei City Constituency 2 =

Constituency of the Legislative Yuan of Taiwan

- Single-member constituency for the Legislative Yuan
- District(s): Wugu, Luzhou, Sanchong (16 villages)
- Electorate: 297,867 (2024 election)

Current constituency
- Created: 2008 (as Taipei County Constituency 2); 2010 (current name)
- Party: DPP
- Member: Lin Shu-fen

New Taipei City Constituency 2 (Chinese: 新北市第二選舉區; pinyin: Xīnběi Shì Dìèr Xuǎnjǔ Qū) is one of the 73 regional constituencies represented in the Legislative Yuan, the national legislature of Taiwan. It was created in 2008 (as Taipei County Constituency 2) following a series of constitutional reforms, and elects one legislator, through first-past-the-post voting, to the Legislative Yuan. It has been represented by Lin Shu-fen of the Democratic Progressive Party since 2008.

== Legislators ==
Election	Legislator	Party
2008	Lin Shu-fen	Democratic Progressive Party

== Election results ==

=== 2008 (Note: Named Taipei County Constituency 2, boundaries unchanged.) ===
2008 Taiwanese legislative election: Taipei County 2
Candidate	Party	Votes	%
Lin Shu-fen	Democratic Progressive Party	59,225	43.17
Ko Shu-min	Kuomintang	54,774	39.93
Yang Lien-fu	Independent	14,948	10.90
Lin Chih-chia	Taiwan Solidarity Union	8,242	6.01
Total		137,189	100.00
Valid votes		137,189	98.73
Invalid/blank votes		1,766	1.27
Total votes		138,955	100.00
Registered voters/turnout		236,761	58.69
Majority		4,451	3.24
Democratic Progressive Party win (new seat)			

=== 2012 ===
* denotes the incumbent legislator

2012 Taiwanese legislative election: New Taipei 2
Candidate	Party	Votes	%	+/–
Lin Shu-fen*	Democratic Progressive Party	114,091	58.73	▲15.56
Chien Wei-chuan	Kuomintang	76,768	39.51	▼0.42
Kung Yu-chien	People's Democratic Party	1,428	0.74	NEW
Wang An-na	Taiwan National Assembly	1,292	0.67	NEW
Chi Ching-sheng	Taiwan Basic Law Alliance	700	0.36	NEW
Total		194,279	100.00	–
Valid votes		194,279	98.48	
Invalid/blank votes		3,000	1.52	
Total votes		197,279	100.00	
Registered voters/turnout		260,393	75.76	
Majority		37,323	19.22	
Democratic Progressive Party hold				

=== 2016 ===
* denotes the incumbent legislator

2016 Taiwanese legislative election: New Taipei 2
Candidate	Party	Votes	%	+/–
Lin Shu-fen*	Democratic Progressive Party	123,299	68.75	▲10.02
Chen Ming-yi	Kuomintang	56,057	31.25	▼8.26
Total		179,356	100.00	–
Valid votes		179,356	97.62	
Invalid/blank votes		4,380	2.38	
Total votes		183,736	100.00	
Registered voters/turnout		274,711	66.88	
Majority		67,242	37.5	
Democratic Progressive Party hold				

=== 2020 ===
* denotes the incumbent legislator

2020 Taiwanese legislative election: New Taipei 2
Candidate	Party	Votes	%	+/–
Lin Shu-fen*	Democratic Progressive Party	132,591	62.37	▼6.38
Chien Wei-chuan	Kuomintang	77,625	36.51	▲5.26
Lun Ta-chih	United Action Alliance	2,376	1.12	NEW
Total		212,592	100.00	–
Valid votes		212,592	98.20	
Invalid/blank votes		3,897	1.80	
Total votes		216,489	100.00	
Registered voters/turnout		288,592	75.02	
Majority		54,966	25.86	
Democratic Progressive Party hold				

=== 2024 ===
* denotes the incumbent legislator

2024 Taiwanese legislative election: New Taipei 2
Candidate	Party	Votes	%	+/–
Lin Shu-fen*	Democratic Progressive Party	118,544	57.05	▼5.32
Li Yu-i	Taiwan People's Party	84,393	40.62	NEW
Ho Yu-sheng	Chinese Unification Promotion Party	4,845	2.33	NEW
Total		207,782	100.00	–
Valid votes		207,782	96.34	
Invalid/blank votes		7,891	3.66	
Total votes		215,673	100.00	
Registered voters/turnout		297,867	72.41	
Majority		34,151	16.43	
Democratic Progressive Party hold				
