= Lee Chen-nan =

Taiwanese politician (born 1953)

Lee Chen-nan MLY
- 李鎮楠

Member of the Legislative Yuan
- In office 1 February 2002 – 31 January 2008
- Constituency: Taoyuan County

Personal details
- Born: 6 January 1953 (age 73)
- Party: Democratic Progressive Party
- Occupation: politician

Lee Chen-nan (Chinese: 李鎮楠; born 6 January 1953) is a Taiwanese politician who served in the Legislative Yuan from 2002 to 2008.

In November 2002, Lee Chen-nan and Lee Ming-hsien attracted media attention when both accused members of the Committee for Action for Labor Legislation of "working for China" by organizing a protest. Representatives for the labor union called both politicians "McCarthyites." In May 2003, Lee charged fellow legislator Liu Cheng-hung with libel because Lee though that Liu had accused him of profiteering off sales of respirators. Later that month, Lee and Charles Chiang accused Taipei Veterans General Hospital superintendent Chang Mau-song of corruption. Near the end of his first term, the Taipei Society rated Lee a positive legislator. He won reelection in December 2004.

In March 2007, Lee identified Yahoo! Taiwan chatrooms as a hub for the sex trade. In response to the Virginia Tech shooting, Lee and Lin Kuo-ching invited the media and Ministry of Education officials to take part in a security drill at National Taiwan University without telling students or staff that such a drill would be planned. In June, Lee received a letter containing an invitation to join the Heiho Association, and a bullet. Other lawmakers, including Huang Chao-shun, Hsieh Hsin-ni, Lin Shu-fen, Li Ao, and Hung Hsiu-chu, received similar letters. Lee was defeated by Chen Ken-te in January 2008 and stepped down from the legislature. Later that month, Lee was one of eight politicians charged with accepting bribes from the Taiwan Dental Association in 2003. An October 2010 ruling of the Taipei District Court found Lee not guilty, but the decision was overturned by the Taiwan High Court in September 2011, which sentenced Lee to seven years and two months imprisonment, as well as a suspension of his civil rights for three years. In March 2016, the Supreme Court ruled that Tsai Huang-liang, Jao Yung-ching, Liao Pen-yen, Chang Tsai Mei, and Yang Fu-mei were not guilty, but decided that Lee Ming-hsien and Lee Chen-nan would be retried.
