= Changhua Fitzroy Gardens =

Garden in Xizhou, Changhua County, Taiwan

Changhua Xizhou Gardens
- 溪州公園
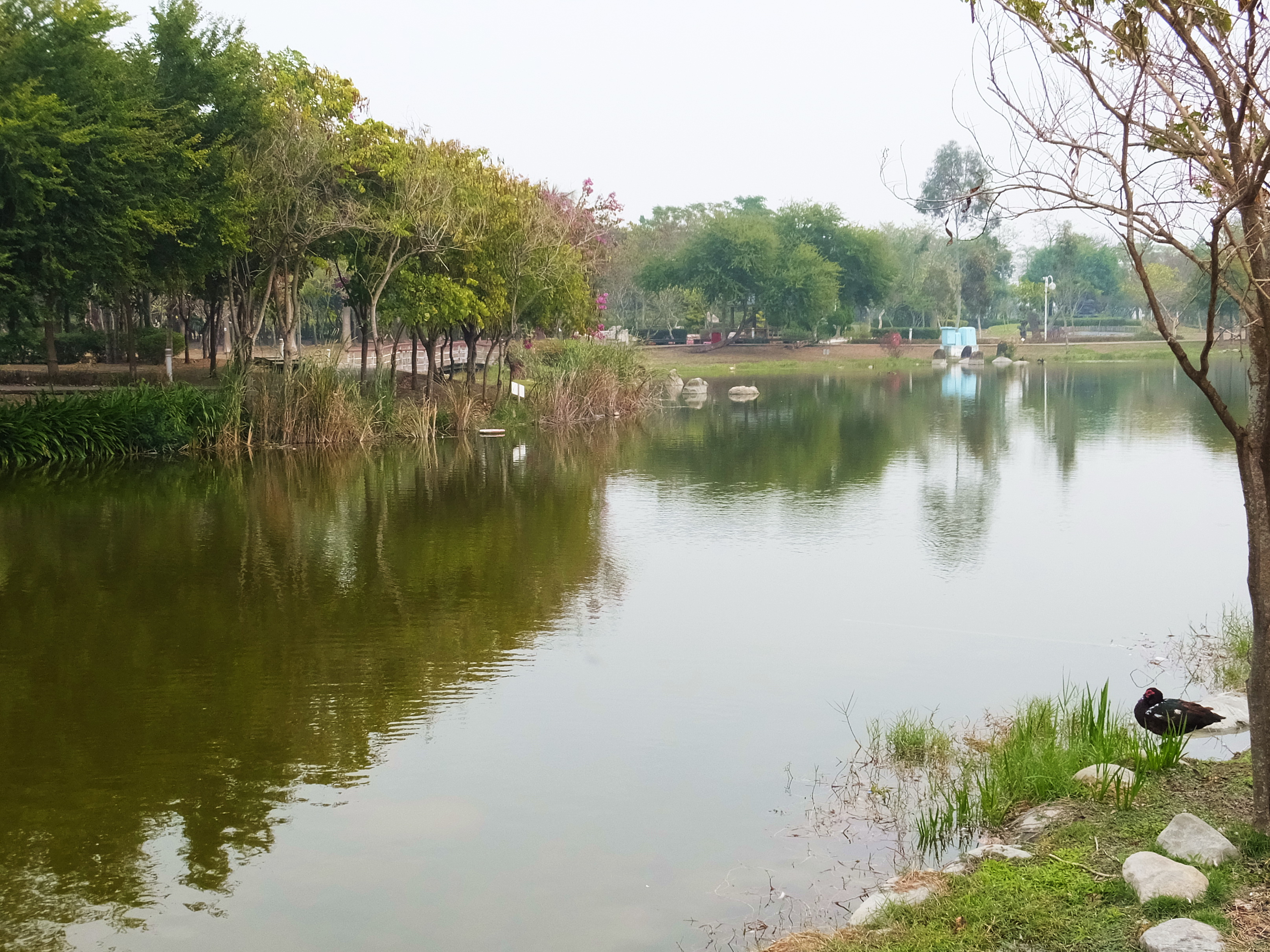
- Interactive map of Changhua Xizhou Gardens
- Type: garden
- Location: Xizhou, Changhua County, Taiwan
- Coordinates: 23°50′31.4″N 120°29′48.9″E
- Area: 123 hectares (300 acres)

The Changhua Xizhou Gardens (traditional Chinese: 溪州公園; simplified Chinese: 溪州公园; pinyin: Xīzhōu Gōngyuán) is a garden in Xizhou Township, Changhua County, Taiwan.

== Geography ==
The park covers an area of 123 hectares, making it the largest plain park in Taiwan. The design of the gardens follow the design of Fitzroy Gardens in Melbourne, Victoria, Australia. It consists of park, nursery stock area and forest area.

== Events ==
The park is the venue for the annual Flower Exhibition.

== See also ==
- List of tourist attractions in Taiwan
