= Huang Tien-fu =

Taiwanese politician (born 1938)

Huang Tien-fu MLY
- 黃天福

Member of the Legislative Yuan
- In office 1 February 1996 – 31 January 1999
- Constituency: Taipei 2 (South)
- In office 1 February 1981 – 31 January 1984
- Constituency: Taipei

Personal details
- Born: 1938 (age 87–88) Dalongdong, Taihoku, Taiwan, Empire of Japan
- Party: Democratic Progressive Party
- Spouse: Lan Mei-chin
- Relatives: Huang Hsin-chieh (brother)
- Education: National Taiwan University (BA)

Huang Tien-fu (Chinese: 黃天福; pinyin: Huáng Tiānfú; born 1938) is a Taiwanese politician.

== Education ==
Huang studied political science at National Taiwan University.

== Political career and activism ==
Huang ran for a seat on the Legislative Yuan in 1980, a year after his elder brother Huang Hsin-chieh was arrested for leading the Kaohsiung Incident. Relatives of other people involved in the Kaohsiung Incident also contested the 1980 election cycle and won, namely Chou Ching-yu and Hsu Jung-shu. While in office, Huang published several magazines affiliated with the tangwai movement, among them Vertical-Horizontal, Political Monitor, and Bell Drum Tower. Copies of the fifth issue of Bell Drum Tower were confiscated by the Kuomintang party-state in May 1983, and Political Monitor was suspended in November. After losing reelection in December, Huang founded Neo Formosa Weekly in June 1984. Neo Formosa Weekly also drew the attention of the government, which banned all but one of its 52 issues. On 19 June 1984, "A Critique of New Marxism" was published in Neo Formosa Weekly, accusing Elmer Fung of plagiarism. Fung sued the magazine for libel in October. On 12 January 1985, the Taipei District Court sentenced Chen Shui-bian, Lee I-yang and Huang Tien-fu to a year's imprisonment. Upon appeal to the Taiwan High Court, all three sentences were shortened to eight months. The trio were released in February 1987. Huang contested the 1989 Legislative Yuan primary for Taipei, but lost. By forming an electoral coalition with Shen Fu-hsiung, Yeh Chu-lan, and Yen Chin-fu, Huang was elected to the Third Legislative Yuan. After Chen Shui-bian won the 2000 presidential election, he offered Huang a position as senior adviser, which Huang held through 2006. Days before the 2008 presidential election, Huang stated, "I'm afraid that Taiwan will become the next Tibet. If the KMT wins the election, we don't know when we will [get the presidency] back." He served the Tsai Ing-wen administration as national policy adviser. In May 2022, the Transitional Justice Commission overturned libel charges against Huang dating back to his tenure on the Neo Formosa Weekly staff.

Huang's wife Lan Mei-chin has also served on the Legislative Yuan.
