= Wu Kuang-hsun =

Taiwanese politician (born 1950)

Wu Kuang-hsun MLY
- 吳光訓

Member of the Legislative Yuan
- In office 1 February 2005 – 31 January 2008
- Constituency: Kaohsiung County
- In office 1 February 1999 – 31 January 2002
- Constituency: Kaohsiung County

Personal details
- Born: 17 June 1950 (age 75) Kaohsiung County, Taiwan
- Party: Kuomintang
- Education: Yung Ta Institute of Technology and Commerce (BS); I-Shou University (MBA)

Wu Kuang-hsun (Chinese: 吳光訓; born 17 June 1950) is a Taiwanese politician. A member of the Kuomintang, he represented Kaohsiung County in the Legislative Yuan from 1999 to 2002 and again from 2005 to 2008.

== Education ==
Wu earned a bachelor's degree in chemical engineering from Yung Ta Institute of Technology and Commerce and later earned a master's degree in business from I-Shou University.

== Political career ==
Wu was first elected to the Legislative Yuan in 1998, and served until 2002. He ran for the Kaohsiung County magistracy in 2001 as the Kuomintang's formal candidate, having run against fellow KMT member Huang Pa-yeh and People First Party candidate Chung Shao-ho. Wu won a second legislative term in 2004, and lost reelection in 2008 to Chen Chi-yu. In 2011, the Taiwan High Court found Wu guilty of buying votes during the 2004 election cycle, and sentenced him to two years and ten months imprisonment. In June 2016, the Taiwan High Court ruled against Wu on charges of stock manipulation dating back to 2008. In the second case, Wu was sentenced to three and a half years imprisonment.
