= Yen Chin-fu =

Taiwanese politician

Yen Chin-fu MLY
- 顏錦福

Member of the Legislative Yuan
- In office 1 February 1999 – 31 January 2005
- Constituency: Republic of China
- In office 1 February 1993 – 31 January 1999
- Constituency: Taipei 2 (South)

Personal details
- Born: 1938 (age 87–88) Tainan Prefecture, Taiwan, Empire of Japan
- Party: Democratic Progressive Party (since 1986)
- Education: National Taiwan Normal University (BS); National Chiao Tung University (MS)

Yen Chin-fu (Chinese: 顏錦福; pinyin: Yán Jǐnfú; born 1938) is a Taiwanese politician. A co-founder of the Democratic Progressive Party, he served in the Legislative Yuan from 1993 to 2005.

== Education ==
Yen attended primary school in Chiayi, and later National Chiayi Senior High School, before graduating from National Beigang Senior High School in Yunlin. He then attended National Taiwan Normal University, followed by the Institute of Computer Sciences at National Chiao Tung University.

== Political career ==
Yen was jailed for sedition from 1962 to 1964. He won election to the Taipei City Council in 1985. In September 1986, Yen and seventeen others founded the Democratic Progressive Party. Within the party, Yen was affiliated with the Welfare State Alliance. Yen was the original candidate for Taipei 2 in the legislative elections of 1989, but ended his campaign to support Yeh Chu-lan. He was elected to a legislative seat in 1992, and reelected in 1995, after forming an electoral coalition with Yeh, Shen Fu-hsiung, and Huang Tien-fu. Yen represented Taipei until 1999, after which he was assigned to the party list and elected to two terms via proportional representation.

Shortly after the 921 earthquake of 1999, Yen proposed a bill to strengthen oversight of charitable donations. After Lin Yi-hsiung stepped down from the DPP chairmanship in 2000, Yen was named a candidate for the position, which eventually went to Frank Hsieh. Though initially opposed to the idea that President Chen Shui-bian assume the party chairmanship concurrently with his position as head of state, Yen later dropped a counter-proposal to hold the 2002 chairmanship election as originally scheduled.

== Personal ==
Yen is an occasional contributor to the Taipei Times. His daughter, Yen Sheng-kuan, has served on the Taipei City Council.
