= Hsieh Yi-fong =

Taiwanese economist and politician

Hsieh Yi-fong MLY
- 謝衣鳯
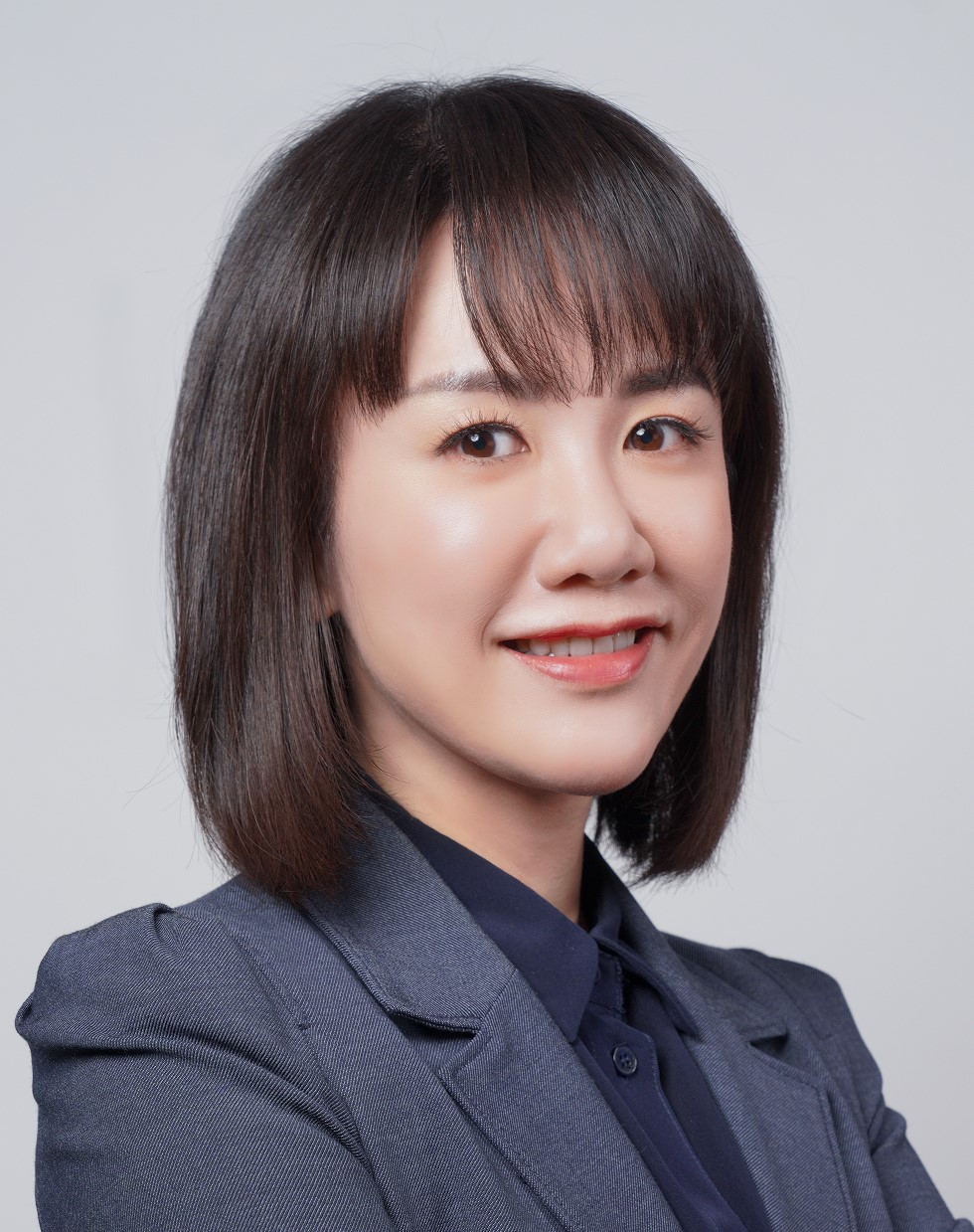
- Official portrait, 2023

Member of the Legislative Yuan
- Incumbent
- Assumed office 1 February 2020
- Preceded by: Hung Chin-yi
- Constituency: Changhua 3

Personal details
- Born: 12 July 1977 (age 49) Xizhou, Changhua, Taiwan
- Party: Kuomintang
- Education: Tamkang University (BS); De Montfort University (MBA); National Chengchi University (PhD)

Hsieh Yi-fong (Chinese: 謝衣鳯; born 12 July 1977) is a Taiwanese economist and politician. She was elected to the Legislative Yuan in 2020 for Changhua County's third constituency.

== Early life and education ==
Hsieh Yi-fong was born on July 12, 1977, in Xizhou, Changhua, to Hsieh Hsin-lung and Cheng Ru-fen. Her brother is Hsieh Tien-lin.

Hsieh graduated from Tamkang University with a bachelor's degree in civil engineering and earned a Master of Business Administration (M.B.A.) from De Montfort University in Leicester, England. She then earned her Ph.D. in economics from National Chengchi University in 2019 under economists Wu Chung-shu and Hung Fu‑sheng (洪福聲). Her doctoral dissertation was titled, "Currency and inflation in the European Union" (歐盟國家之貨幣與通膨).

== Political career ==
Hsieh worked for her mother Cheng Ru-fen during Cheng's tenure on the Legislative Yuan and was a member of the twentieth convocation of the Central Committee of the Kuomintang. Hsieh won election to the Legislative Yuan in 2020, as a Kuomintang representative of Changhua County's third constituency.
