= Xizhou, Changhua =

Rural township in Changhua County, Taiwan

Coordinates: 24°06′56″N 120°32′06″E

Xizhou Township 溪州鄉 Sijhou
- Rural township
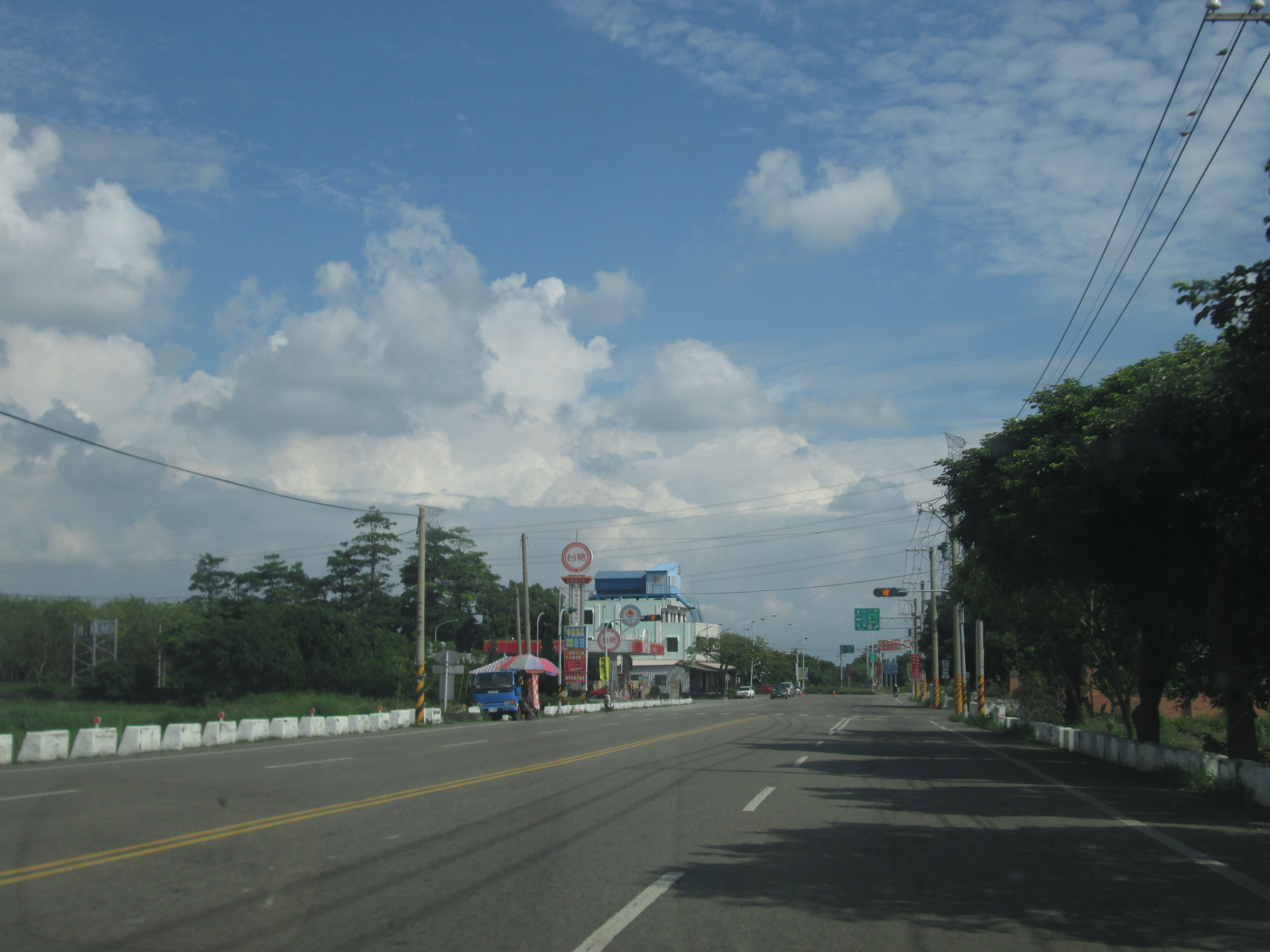

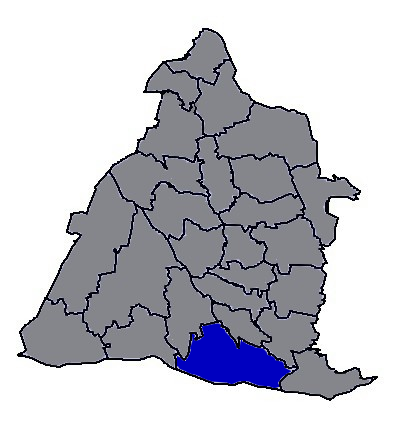
- Xizhou Township in Changhua County
- Location: Changhua County, Taiwan

Area
  - Total: 75.83 km^{2} (29.28 sq mi)

Population (January 2023)
  - Total: 28,597
  - Density: 377.1/km^{2} (976.7/sq mi)

Xizhou Township (Chinese: 溪州鄉; pinyin: Xīzhōu Xiāng; Wade-Giles: Hsi^{1}-chou^{1} Hsiang^{1}) is a rural township in Changhua County, Taiwan. It has a population total of 28,597 and an area of 75.83 square kilometres (29.28 sq mi). It is the third largest township in Changhua County after Erlin and Fangyuan.

== Administrative divisions ==
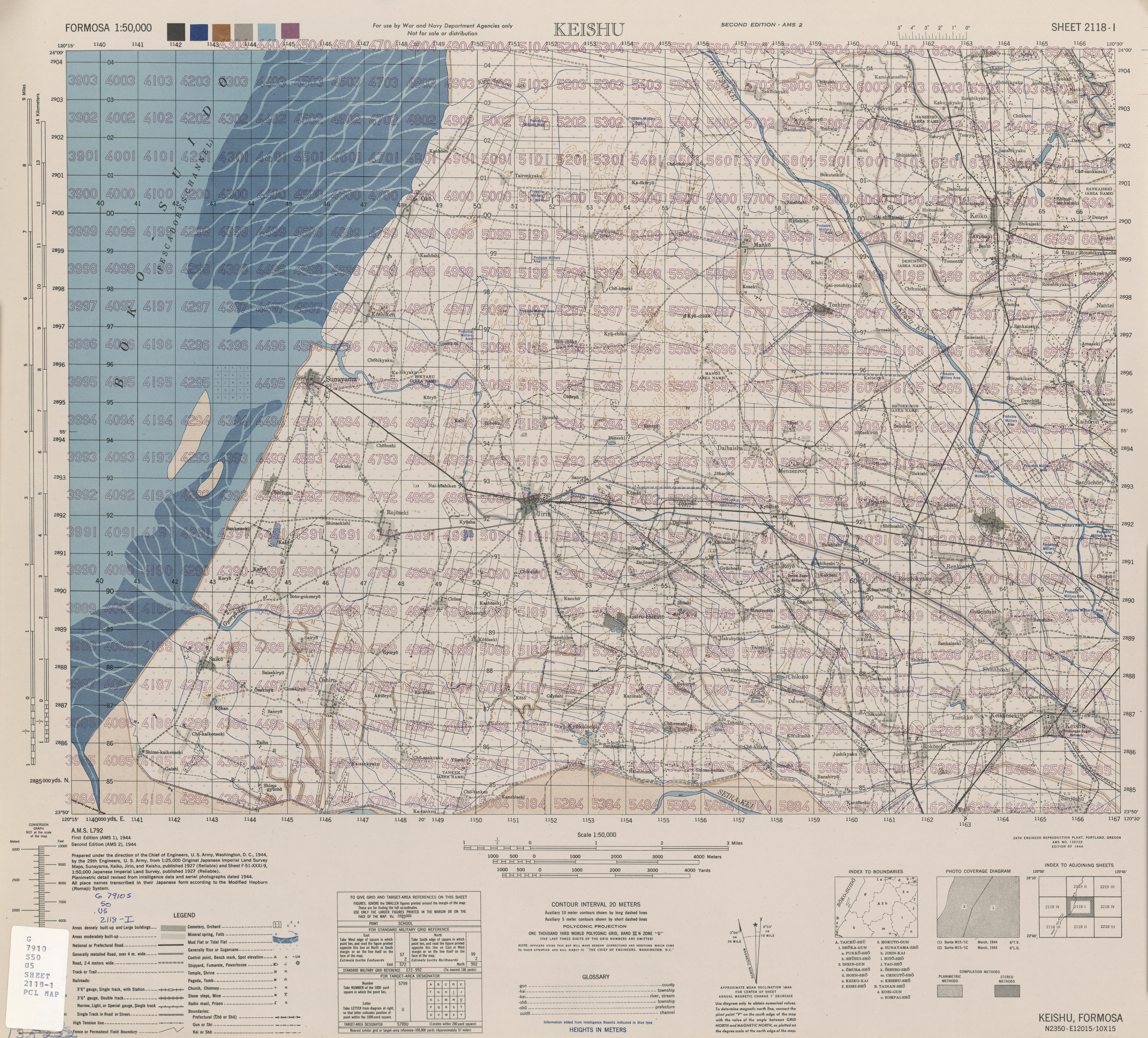
Map of Xizhou (labeled as Keishū) and surrounding area (1944)

The township comprises 19 villages: Caigong, Chaoyang, Chenggong, Dazhuang, Ganyuan, Jiumei, Kengcuo, Rongguang, Santiao, Sanzun, Shuiwei, Tungzhou, Wacuo, Weicuo, Xicuo, Xipan, Xizhou, Zhangcuo and Zunliao.

== Tourist attractions ==
- Changhua Fitzroy Gardens
- Xiluo Bridge

== Notable natives ==
- Bobby Chen, singer and producer
- Hsieh Yi-fong, member of Legislative Yuan
