= Lu Po-chi =

Taiwanese politician

Lo Po-chi
- 盧博基

Member of the Legislative Yuan
- In office 1 February 2002 – 31 January 2008
- Succeeded by: Fu Kun-chi
- Constituency: Hualien County

Personal details
- Born: 11 May 1949 (age 76) Hualien County, Taiwan
- Party: Democratic Progressive Party
- Education: Dahan Institute of Technology (BS)

Lu Po-chi (Chinese: 盧博基; born 11 May 1949) is a Taiwanese politician. A member of the Democratic Progressive Party, he represented Hualien County in the Legislative Yuan between 2002 and 2008.

== Education and early career ==
Lu attended what became the Dahan Institute of Technology, where he studied civil engineering. Outside of politics, he had invested in Huilan Television.

== Political career ==
Prior to contesting the legislative elections of 2001, Lu served three terms on the Hualien County Council. His victory over Michael You in the legislative primaries held that April was considered unexpected, and subsequently he was elected to represent the Hualien County district in December. Shortly after taking office in February 2002, Lu received a single vote in a speakership election won by Wang Jin-pyng. The next year, Lu led You's campaign as he contested the Hualien County magistracy. As leader of the Democratic Progressive Party's campaign headquarters, Lu coordinated party efforts on behalf of its 2004 presidential ticket. During Lu's first term, he supported the establishment of direct flights between Hualien Airport and Seoul. In November 2004, Lu proposed that freeing captured animals be prohibited, to prevent commercialization of the release.

Lu was again named a DPP legislative candidate in 2004, and was reelected alongside Fu Kun-chi. Lu backed the construction of a freeway between Hualien and Yilan during his second term in office. The DPP nominated Lu as its candidate for the Hualien County magisterial election in 2005. He lost the contest to Hsieh Shen-shan. Lu ran for legislative reelection in 2008, losing to Fu Kun-chi.
