= Yung Ta Institute of Technology and Commerce =

Private university in Linluo, Pingtung County, Taiwan

Coordinates: 22.6545°N 120.5235°E

- 永達技術學院
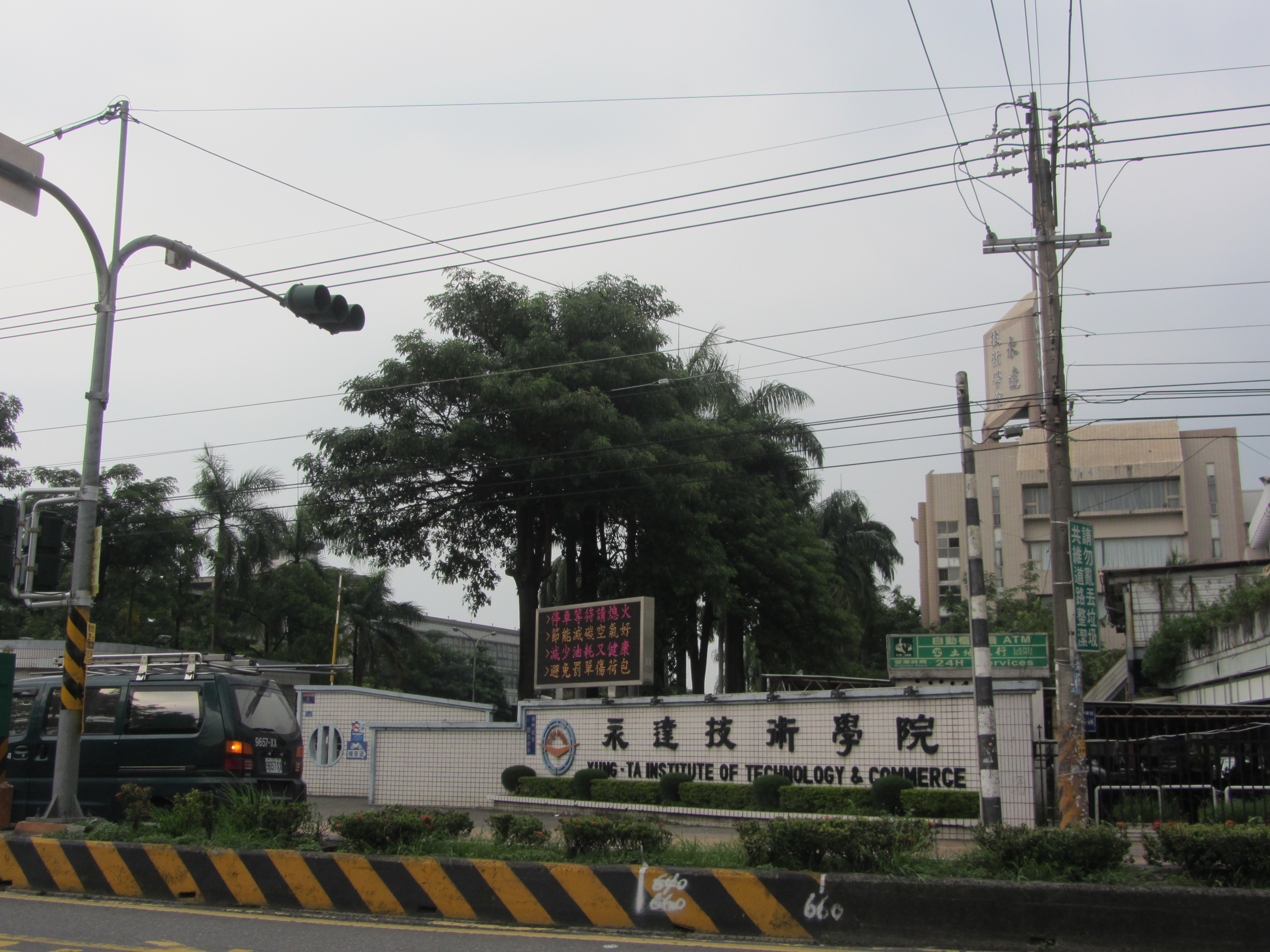
- Type: Private
- Established: 1967; 1999 (as YTIT)
- Location: Linluo, Pingtung County, Taiwan
- Website: www6.ytit.edu.tw

Yung Ta Institute of Technology and Commerce
- Traditional Chinese: 永達技術學院
Transcriptions
Standard Mandarin
- Hanyu Pinyin: Yǒngdá Jìshù Xuéyuàn

Yung Ta Institute of Technology and Commerce (YTIT; Chinese: 永達技術學院) is a private university located in Linluo Township, Pingtung County, Taiwan.

== History ==
According to statistics compiled by the Ministry of Education in 2013, the Yung Ta Institute of Technology and Commerce had an enrollment of less than 1,000 students, and was considered a potential merger candidate alongside other private educational institutions. The education ministry announced in February 2014 that Yung Ta had been barred from enrolling any new students for one year. Its principal declared in August 2014 that the university would close down soon. However, Yung Ta remained open through 2019. The education ministry stated that if the institute did not close by 8 January 2020, the ministry would force the school to close.

== Faculties ==
- Department of Mechanical Engineering
- Department of Vehicle Engineering
- Department of Electronic Engineering
- Department of Electrical Engineering
- Department of Architectural Engineering
- Department of Industrial and Business Management
- Department of Business Administration
- Department of Marketing Management
- Department of Information Management
- Department of Biotechnology
- Department of Cosmetic Application and Management
- Department of Sports, Health and Leisure
- Department of Applied Foreign Languages

== Transportation ==
The school was accessible East of Guilai Station of Taiwan Railway.

== See also ==
- List of universities in Taiwan
