= Tsai Ling-lan =

Taiwanese politician (born 1942)

Tsai Ling-lan MLY
- 蔡鈴蘭

Member of the Legislative Yuan
- In office 1 February 1999 – 31 January 2005
- Constituency: Republic of China

Personal details
- Born: 13 May 1942 (age 84)
- Party: Kuomintang

Tsai Ling-lan (Chinese: 蔡鈴蘭; born 13 May 1942) is a Taiwanese politician.

She served on the National Assembly and was later elected to two terms on the Legislative Yuan. Tsai has served as national policy adviser to President Ma Ying-jeou.
