= Tuan Yi-kang =

Taiwanese politician

Tuan Yi-kang MLY
- 段宜康
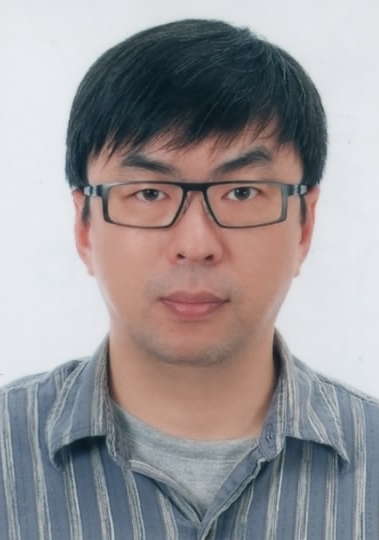

Member of the Legislative Yuan
- In office 1 February 2012 – 31 January 2020
- Constituency: National At-Large
- In office 1 February 2002 – 1 February 2005
- Constituency: Taipei 2nd

Personal details
- Born: 14 November 1963 (age 62) Taipei, Taiwan
- Party: Democratic Progressive Party
- Education: National Taiwan University (BA)

Tuan Yi-kang (Chinese: 段宜康; pinyin: Duàn Yíkāng; born 14 November 1963) is a Taiwanese politician. A former leader of the Democratic Progressive Party's now-abolished New Tide faction, he has served on the party's Central Standing Committee, the Taipei City Council and the Legislative Yuan.

== Early life and education ==
Tuan was born in Taipei to a waishengren family. His parents were Chinese refugees from Jiangsu who migrated to Taiwan during the Great Retreat.

After graduating from Ta-Chih Junior High School and Cheng Kung Senior High School, Tuan attended National Taiwan University, where he earned a bachelor's degree in political science.

== Political career ==
Tuan started his political career by working for legislators Lu Hsiu-yi, Hung Chi-chang and Yeh Chu-lan. He was Kao Chih-peng's campaign manager in Kao's 1993 run for Penghu County Magistrate. In 1994, Tuan was elected to the Taipei City Council, and served until 2002. Tuan took office in the Legislative Yuan later that year, and was defeated in his 2005 reelection campaign. He was the chief convener of the New Tide faction, before it was officially dissolved in 2006. In 2008, Tuan served within the Democratic Progressive Party as deputy secretary-general, resigning in March.

=== 2008 legislative election ===
He won a primary against David Huang, losing to Kuomintang incumbent Lin Yu-fang in the 2008 legislative elections.

- Eligible voters: 238,616
- Total votes cast (Ratio): 151,986 (63.69%)
- Valid Votes (Ratio): 150,147 (98.79%)
- Invalid Votes (Ratio): 1,839 (1.21%)

No.	Candidate	Party	Votes	Ratio	Elected
1	Ye Mei (葉玫)	Home Party	324	0.22%	
2	Wu Jian Yi (吳建毅)	Taiwan Farmers' Party	251	0.17%	
3	Wei Jhih Jhong (魏志中)	Independent	284	0.19%	
4	Lin Yu-fang	Kuomintang	87,448	58.23%	
5	Huang Ci Bin (黃啟彬)	Taiwan Constitution Association	360	0.24%	
6	Tuan Yi-kang	Democratic Progressive Party	61,480	40.95%	

Tuan was elected to the DPP Central Standing Committee in 2010. He contested the 2012 legislative elections as a candidate for Taipei's second district, but later withdrew from the district party primary. He won a seat in the Legislative Yuan through the proportional representation ballot. He was also reelected to the CSC. Tuan was placed on the proportional representation list again for the 2016 elections, and won an at-large seat. In June, Tuan stated that he would retire from politics at the end of his term in 2020, as he expected reforms he supported over the course of his legislature tenure to have been implemented by that time.

== Controversy ==
Lien Chan's daughter Lien Hui-hsin sued Tuan for slander in 2004, for alleging that she had helped her father commit tax evasion.

Tuan claimed in January 2015 that President Ma Ying-jeou illegally accepted NT$200 million from various businesspeople during his 2008 presidential campaign. Later that month Ma filed a lawsuit against Tuan for NT$10 million. In February 2016, the Taipei District Court ordered Tuan to pay Ma NT$600,000. The penalty was retained in a December 2016 Taiwan High Court ruling.

In December 2015, Tuan accused Wang Ju-hsuan of improperly profiting in the real estate market by acquiring multiple properties intended to house military families. Wang sued Tuan for defamation, but the Taipei District Prosecutors’ Office dropped the case, and also found that none of Wang's real estate deals were illegal.

Fellow Democratic Progressive Party member and incumbent Hualien City mayor Tien Chih-hsuan died in May 2016, and the DPP lost the subsequent by-election in August. After the results of the vote were announced, Tuan made Facebook posts that were critical of Hualien voters, for which he apologized. In September, Tuan accused Radio Taiwan International of "assisting" unification efforts, by renting low-cost airtime to the China-based Guangdong Television.
