= Tsai Chi-chang =

Taiwanese politician (born 1969)

Tsai Chi-chang MLY
- 蔡其昌
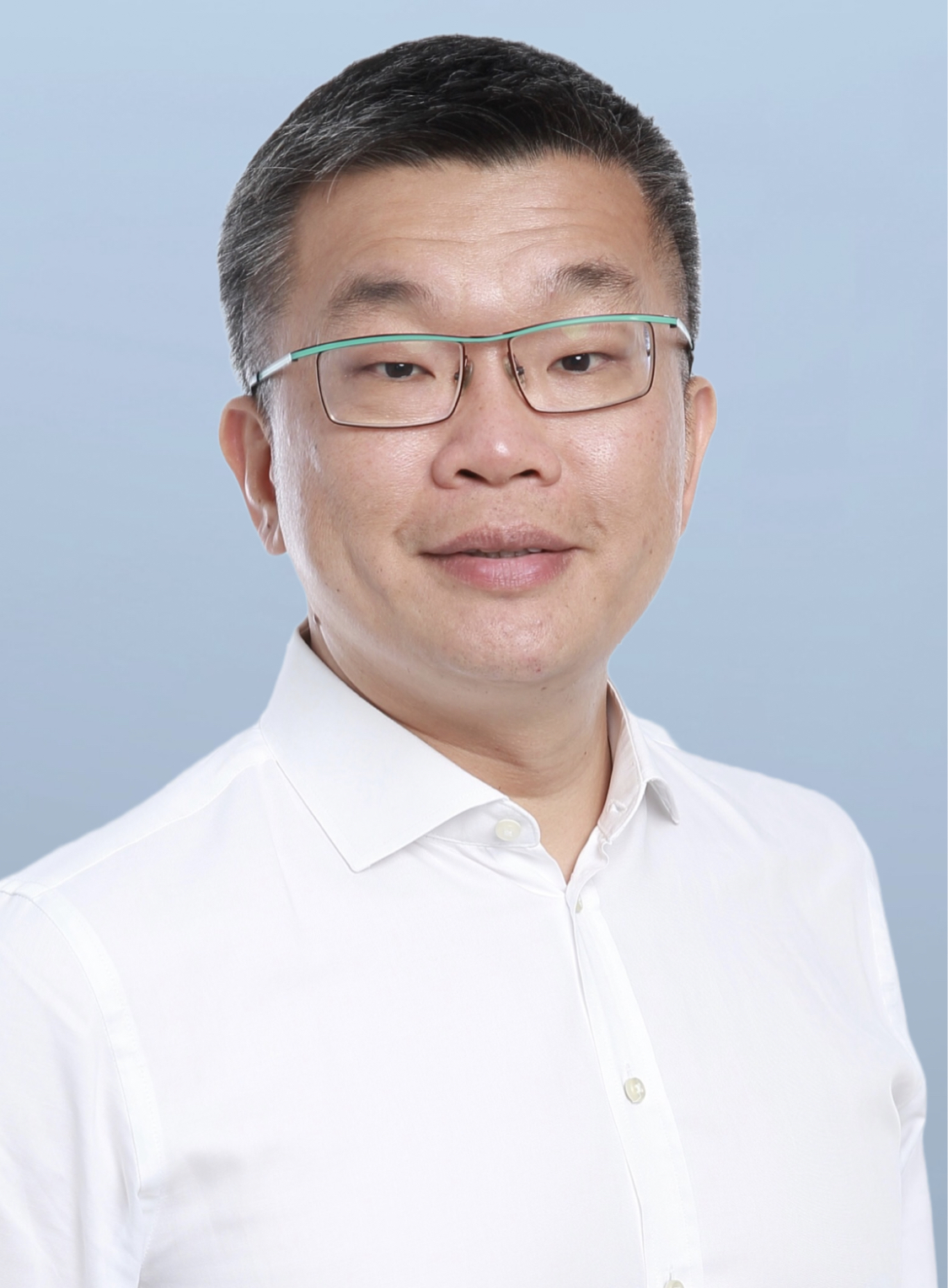
- Official portrait, 2019

15th Vice President of the Legislative Yuan
- In office 1 February 2016 – 1 February 2024
- President: Su Jia-chyuan; Yu Shyi-kun
- Preceded by: Hung Hsiu-chu
- Succeeded by: Johnny Chiang

Member of the Legislative Yuan
- Incumbent
- Assumed office 1 February 2012
- Preceded by: Liu Chuan-chung
- Constituency: Taichung 1
- In office 1 February 2005 – 31 January 2008
- Constituency: Taichung County

11th Commissioner of the Chinese Professional Baseball League
- Incumbent
- Assumed office 19 January 2021
- Preceded by: John Wu

Personal details
- Born: 16 April 1969 (age 57) Qingshui, Taichung County, Taiwan
- Party: Democratic Progressive Party
- Education: Tunghai University (BA, MA); National Chung Hsing University (MBA)

Tsai Chi-chang (Chinese: 蔡其昌; pinyin: Cài Qíchāng; born 16 April 1969) is a Taiwanese politician and member of the Legislative Yuan. A member of the Democratic Progressive Party (DPP), he was elected to the Legislative Yuan in 2012 and served as deputy speaker from 2016 to 2024. He has served as commissioner of the Chinese Professional Baseball League (CPBL) since 2021.

== Early life and education ==
Tsai was born on April 16, 1969, in Qingshui District, Taichung. He has three sisters. His father, Tsai Ming-lin (蔡銘霖), was a businessman who ran a garment factory.

After high school, Tsai graduated from Tunghai University with a bachelor's degree in history and earned a master's degree in history from the university in 1995. As an undergraduate, he participated in the Wild Lily student movement. He then obtained his Master of Business Administration (M.B.A.) from National Chung Hsing University.

== Political career ==
He was elected to the Legislative Yuan in Taichung's first constituency in 2012 and re-elected in 2016. He was Deputy Speaker of Legislative Yuan from 1 February 2016 until 1 February 2024.

In May 2022, Tsai was nominated by the DPP for the Taichung mayoral election.

On 17 August 2022, in the aftermath of then Speaker of the United States House of Representatives Nancy Pelosi's visit to Taiwan on 2–3 August, China blacklisted seven Taiwanese officials including Tsai as "diehard "Taiwan independence" separatists" due to their support for Taiwan independence. The blacklist bans them from entering mainland China and the Special Administrative Regions of Hong Kong and Macau, and restricts them from working with Chinese officials. Chinese state-run tabloid Global Times labelled Tsai and the six officials as "diehard secessionists".

== CPBL commissioner ==
An agreement was reached for Tsai to become commissioner of Taiwan's Chinese Professional Baseball League (CPBL) in December 2020 as the previous commissioner's term was ending, and he was formally elected to the post on 19 January 2021, succeeding John Wu.

During his first year as commissioner, he further expanded the CPBL from five teams to six teams, with the addition of Taiwan Steel Group.
