= Liu Chuan-chung =

Taiwanese politician

Liu Chuan-chung MLY
- 劉銓忠

Member of the Legislative Yuan
- In office 1 February 2008 – 31 January 2012
- Succeeded by: Tsai Chi-chang
- Constituency: Taichung 1
- In office 1 February 1999 – 31 January 2008
- Constituency: Taichung County

Personal details
- Born: 5 April 1942 Taikō, Taichū Prefecture, Taiwan, Empire of Japan
- Died: 5 July 2016 (aged 74)
- Party: Kuomintang

Liu Chuan-chung (Chinese: 劉銓忠 5 April 1942 – 5 July 2016) was a Taiwanese politician.

== Political career ==
Liu was active in multiple Taichung-based agricultural associations and businesses. He served on the Taichung County Council and Taiwan Provincial Council before running in the 1998 legislative elections. Liu served four consecutive terms on the Legislative Yuan, stepping down in 2012.

His health deteriorated in later life, as he suffered a stroke and underwent amputation due to complications of diabetes. Liu died at the age of 74 in 2016.
