= Lin Chin-hsing =

Taiwanese politician (born 1953)

Lin Chin-hsing MLY
- 林進興

Member of the Legislative Yuan
- In office 1 February 2002 – 31 January 2008
- Preceded by: multi-member district
- Succeeded by: Chung Shao-ho
- Constituency: Kaohsiung 1

Personal details
- Born: 12 May 1953 (age 72) Kaohsiung, Taiwan
- Party: Independent (2003; 2006–?; since 2014)
- Other political affiliations: Democratic Progressive Party (until 2006; 2014)
- Education: Kaohsiung Medical University (MB, BS); Yale University (MPH); Johns Hopkins University (MS, PhD)
- Scientific career
- Fields: Public health
- Thesis: The difficulties of implementing electronic medical records in Taiwan (1999)
- Doctoral advisor: Donald Steinwachs

Lin Chin-hsing (Chinese: 林進興; born 12 May 1953), also known by his English name Peter Lin, is a Taiwanese physician and politician. He was a member of the Legislative Yuan from 2002 to 2008, and faced legal action throughout his time in office, which twice led to his expulsion from the Democratic Progressive Party. Lin was a DPP candidate for Kaohsiung City Council in the 2014 Taiwanese local elections, but was not elected.

== Early life and education ==
Lin was born in Kaohsiung, Taiwan, on May 12, 1953. He attended medical school at Kaohsiung Medical University, where he earned an M.B. and B.S. in pharmacy. He then completed graduate studies in the United States at Yale University and Johns Hopkins University, earning a Master of Public Health (M.P.H.) from the Yale School of Public Health, then a Master of Science (M.S.) in computer science and his Ph.D. in public health in 1999 from the Johns Hopkins Bloomberg School of Public Health. His doctoral dissertation, completed under professor Donald Steinwachs, was titled, "The difficulties of implementing electronic medical records in Taiwan".

Prior to his political career, Lin operated his own clinic, where he offered free medical care to the poor.

== Political career ==
During his first legislative campaign in 2001, Lin helped many Kuomintang members who had left the party and considered joining the Democratic Progressive Party, following the KMT's decision to expel its former chairman Lee Teng-hui. He also led a group of DPP members to gather outside the chamber of the Kaohsiung City Council in support of mayor Frank Hsieh, after hearing about a disagreement between Hsieh and council speaker Huang Chi-chuan.

While running for reelection in 2004, Lin campaigned alongside Kuan Bi-ling, Lee Kun-tse, and Tseng Tsan-teng, utilizing a vote allocation scheme that saw all four candidates win.

Prior to the 2008 legislative election, Lin was due to receive the Democratic Progressive Party's nomination for Kaohsiung 3, by virtue of leading Lee Kun-tse in opinion polls, but the decision to confirm Lin's nomination was delayed, as he was indicted for health insurance fraud. Lee eventually defeated Tseng Tsahn-deng in an inter-party opinion poll and obtained the DPP's formal backing. Lin chose to contest the legislative election as a political independent, and the Taiwan Tongzhi Hotline Association, an LGBT rights organization, placed him on a list of candidates to boycott.

During the 2012 presidential election, Lin was a member of the Tsai Ing-wen campaign staff based in Kaohsiung.

Lin ran as a Democratic Progressive Party candidate for Kaohsiung City Council, but was critical of the Kaohsiung City Government's handling of the 2014 Kaohsiung dengue fever outbreak, as well as companies headquartered in Kaohsiung during the 2014 Taiwan food scandal. He received 4.56% of the vote, and was not seated to the city council.

Lin aided Chen Chi-mai's campaign during the 2020 Kaohsiung mayoral by-election.

=== Controversy ===
After Lin's legislative colleagues Diane Lee and Yang Fu-mei falsely accused Twu Shiing-jer of assaulting a restaurateur in 2002, Lin initiated proceedings to discipline the pair.

In April 2003, Lin was one of forty people indicted as part of an investigation into voting buying during the December 2002 election of the Kaohsiung City Council speaker and deputy speaker. Shortly after his indictment, Lin was expelled from the Democratic Progressive Party. Lin's ex-wife Chang Wen-hsiu stood accused of accepting a NT$5 million bribe from Chu An-hsiung, and Lin was indicted as an accomplice because he was present when the transaction took place. Prosecutors sought a one-year prison sentence for Lin. The Kaohsiung District Court gave Lin and Chang identical prison sentences of eighteen months. Upon appeal to the Taiwan High Court, Lin was acquitted of bribery, and announced his intention to rejoin the DPP. Su Hui-chen claimed in 2004 that Lin and Hsueh Ling were involved in vote buying during the 2001 legislative elections. The Democratic Progressive Party formed a task force to probe the allegations.

During the 2005 Taiwanese local elections, Lin Chin-hsing published the medical records of incumbent Taichung mayor Jason Hu, who was seeking reelection. Hu's party, the Kuomintang, stated that Lin's medical license should be revoked for violations of the Doctor's Law, specifically articles 23 and 25 regarding patient privacy. Democratic Progressive Party legislative caucus whip William Lai observed that what Lin did was "inappropriate and unnecessary," but opined that the judiciary and medical authorities should be responsible for deciding if Lin's actions constituted a violation of the law. While Hu was pondering his next legal steps against Lin, the Taichung City Government's Medical Doctor Disciplinary Committee suspended Lin's medical license for one year. Lin argued that the committee had no power to make the decision, because he was registered to practice in Kaohsiung. Lin soon publicly apologized to Hu. Annette Lu, acting chair of the Democratic Progressive Party, suggested that Lin face party discipline for his actions. Hu opted not to pursue further legal action.

In October 2005, Lin's hospital was searched by the Tainan Prosecutor's Office. Lin and fellow physician-turned-legislator Chiu-Yung-jen were two of 32 people indicted on charges of health insurance fraud. Subsequently, the DPP suspended both Lin and Chiu's membership. On 13 April 2006, both were formally expelled from the party. Lin's trial began in August 2006, and he pled not guilty. He was eventually found guilty in 2008.

In May 2009, the Tainan District Court sentenced Lin Chin-hsing to two years imprisonment and five years of probation. Soon after, Lin renamed his medical practice. On 27 May 2009, the Tainan Prosecutors' Office cracked down on a ring of fraudulent consulting physicians. Lin's clinic was deemed a victim of this ring, as its members presented forged medical licenses to multiple medical facilities.

Lin Chin-hsing was attacked by two men on 27 July 2009, while eating at a seafood restaurant in Sanmin District with friends. The police found the suspects the next day, and both confessed, explaining that they were unhappy with the fact that Lin had never been imprisoned for health insurance fraud, and decided to attack him after passing the eatery. Lee Kun-tse acknowledged knowing Lin's attackers when Lin asked, but stated that he never employed them as legislative assistants, campaign aides, or chauffeurs.

On 13 June 2012, the Kaohsiung branch of the Taiwan High Court ruled that a February 2006 death at Lin's medical practice was due in part to the absence of an anesthesiologist. Lin and the anesthesiologist were to compensate the patients' family NT$391 million.

== Veterinary career ==
Lin took an entrance exam in July 2009 intending to study veterinary medicine and was admitted to the National Pingtung University of Science and Technology. He turned his old clinic into a veterinary practice in 2011.

== Political views, commentary, and advocacy ==
=== Medical funding and health policy ===
As a legislator, he was active in discussions on funding, particularly in regards to health insurance. In 2002, he stated that National Health Insurance rates should not be raised during an economic downturn, or without first reducing inefficiencies and waste in the system. In 2004, Lin called for the reimbursement rate of smaller hospitals to be increased so that those medical facilities could avoid accruing debt.

During the 2003 SARS outbreak, Lin advised frequent handwashing and stated that gloves were better protection against the virus than gauze masks. He expressed support for the tracking of Chinese people in Taiwan to limit the spread of the disease.

=== Military and national security ===
Lin was a member of an "anti-betrayal alliance," and later the Alliance Against Selling Out Taiwan. Lin repeatedly raised concerns about Taiwanese military officers' susceptibility to infiltration from China, and also proposed bills to improve military culture for conscripts. In 2002, Lin commented on the end of Operation Starlight, a training program that had been a part of Singapore–Taiwan military relations since 1975. Later that year, Lin opposed his party and withdrew support from a deal to acquire Kidd-class destroyers from the United States. In 2003, Lin claimed that Chinese agents were focused on enticing Taiwanese computer scientists and soldiers, and that some Chinese people had acquired Taiwanese citizenship using false documents. Lin also alleged that China had hired Taiwanese fishermen as spies. That year he also raised concerns about Taiwanese veterans collecting pensions while residing in China, and about the return of a former National Security Bureau official to Taiwan who had retired from his government post to work in China. Prior to the passage of China's Anti-Secession Law in 2005, Lin opposed a proposed Taiwan Solidarity Union-backed Legislative Yuan resolution against the law. After the law had passed, however, Lin called for the People's Republic of China not to enact it, but pursue further talks with Taiwan. He organized a protest march against the law, jointly proposed an "anti-invasion law" in the Legislative Yuan, and drew attention to war songs about China still being sung by Taiwan's military. After members of the Pan-Blue Coalition visited China later that year, Lin stated that they should have negotiated repatriation plans for the 2,223 Chinese people who were detained for illegally immigrating to Taiwan.

== Personal life ==
Lin Chin-hsing's sister Lin Mei-ling ran in a 2004 by-election for Kaohsiung City Council.
