= Chen Hsien-chung =

Taiwanese politician

Chen Hsien-chung MLY
- 陳憲中

Member of the Legislative Yuan
- In office 1 February 2005 – 31 January 2008
- Constituency: Yunlin County

Personal details
- Born: 1948 (age 77–78) Yunlin County, Taiwan
- Party: Democratic Progressive Party
- Education: Tamkang University (BA)

Chen Hsien-chung (Chinese: 陳憲中; born 1948) is a Taiwanese politician.

== Education and career ==
Chen attended primary and secondary school in Beigang, Yunlin, and studied banking at Tamkang University.

A member of the Democratic Progressive Party, won election to the Legislative Yuan in 2004 as a representative of Yunlin County. Chen frequently criticized legislative gridlock, and, in January 2007, found himself in a physical altercation with fellow legislator Chen Chao-jung. Chen Hsien-chung was often involved in budget discussions, and was also known for his opposition to the use of ractopamine in pork products. Chen lost to Chang Chia-chun in the legislative elections of 2008.
