= Third Society Party =

Third Society Party 第三社會黨 Dìsān Shèhuì Dǎng (Mandarin) Thi-sâm Sa-fi Tóng (Hakka)
- Leader: Jou Yi-Cheng
- Founded: July 15, 2007
- Dissolved: April 29, 2020
- Headquarters: Taipei, Taiwan
- Ideology: Social democracy Progressivism; Pro-Americanism
- Political position: Centre-left

The Third Society Party (TSP; Chinese: 第三社會黨; pinyin: Dìsān Shèhuì Dǎng; Pe̍h-ōe-jī: Tē-saⁿ Siā-hōe Tóng) was a Taiwanese political party headed by Jou Yi-Cheng, a former member of the Democratic Progressive Party (DPP). The party was founded in 2007 and dissolved in 2020.

== History ==
The TSP was formally established in July 2007. It fielded candidates in the legislative elections on 12 January 2008, but declared that it would not nominate any candidate for the 2008 presidential election, or support any of the candidates fielded by the Pan-Greens or the Pan-Blues. For the legislative elections, the party focused on the second ballot, where voters choose a party, rather than the first ballot voting for individual candidates.

Thirteen people were on the first list of potential TSP legislative candidates, including Wu Rwei-ren (吳叡人), an assistant researcher with Academia Sinica's Institute of Taiwan History, Lee Ting-tsan (李丁讚), a professor with the Institute of Sociology, National Tsing Hua University, and other scholars who were regarded as close to the DPP in their policies.

== Policies ==
The position of the new party on Taiwanese national identity was that the Taiwanese community, comprising the 23 million people in Taiwan and its outlying islands, was an independent and sovereign nation, with the Republic of China as its constitutional name.

The TSP called for the establishment of the country's "eighth constitutional reform"—or the "third republic" constitutional reform—calling for a parliamentary system of government; single-member constituency and two-vote electoral system; the holding of a nationwide referendum on the content of a new constitution; and lowering the threshold to initiate constitutional reforms.

== See also ==
- List of political parties in Taiwan
