= Yang Chung-tse =

Taiwanese politician

Yang Chung-tse (Chinese: 楊宗哲) is a Taiwanese politician.

== Education ==
Yang holds a master of business administration from Tunghai University.

== Political career ==
Yang served two full terms on the Changhua County Council. He was first elected to lead Xihu in the 1997 mayoral elections, reelected in 2002, and removed from office in 2003. The following year, Yang won election to the Legislative Yuan, on behalf of the Non-Partisan Solidarity Union.

During his legislative term, Yang drew media attention for missing several sessions of the Legislative Yuan, including a vote of no confidence against President Chen Shui-bian, and, in particular, did not attend any committee-level meetings throughout the fourth session of the Sixth Legislative Yuan. As a legislator, he supported initiatives for animal rights and welfare, and co-sponsored an online referendum to select a Taiwanese national bird.

Yang ran as an independent candidate for Changhua County's third district in the 2008 legislative election, but finished behind Lin Chung-mo and Cheng Ru-fen.

== Legal judgments ==
Yang had been removed from political office in Xihu in 2003, after being sentenced to fourteen years in prison during the first trial of a bribery case against him. In May 2012, an appeal was heard by the Taichung branch of the Taiwan High Court, and his prison sentence was reduced to thirteen years. The Supreme Court ruled on the case in September 2018, further reducing Yang's sentence to nine years.
