= Civil Party (Taiwan) =

Civil Party 公民黨
- Founded: 7 March 1993
- Headquarters: Zuoying, Kaohsiung, Taiwan
- Legislative Yuan: 0 / 113

Website
- gygb.myweb.hinet.net/qq.htm

The Civil Party (Chinese: 公民黨; pinyin: Gōngmín Dǎng) is a minor political party in Taiwan founded on 7 March 1993. It has no representation in the Legislative Yuan, but won one seat in the National Assembly election of 2005. In the 2008 legislative election it had the following policies in its manifesto: establishing a Zhonghua minzu Grand Republic of Taiwan (中華民族台灣大公國), being a federation of seven or ten small constituent republics; developing nuclear weapons; releasing all prisoners except those convicted of grave offences; legalization of euthanasia and prostitution.
