= Hakka Party =

Hakka Party 客家黨
- Leader: Tsai Chua Niu
- Founded: 14 October 2006
- Dissolved: 18 March 2022
- Headquarters: Taipei, Taiwan
- Ideology: Hakka interests Social democracy
- Political position: Center-left

The Hakka Party (Chinese: 客家黨; pinyin: Kèjiādǎng) is a minor party in Taiwan, aiming to represent the Hakka people. Their party leader is Tsai Chua Niu.

The Hakka Party developed out of a reaction to the effects of Taiwanization, which Hakkas felt promoted the culture of the Hoklo people at the expense of Hakka and aboriginal culture. In politics, some Hakka activists perceived the Democratic Progressive Party (DPP) as a "Hoklo-only party", given that the language of the DPP rallies, meetings, and protests is Taiwanese Hokkien. On the other hand, the Kuomintang was perceived to represent primarily mainlander interests.
