= Charles Chiang =

Taiwanese banker and politician (born 1943)

Charles Chiang MLY
- 江昭儀

Member of the Legislative Yuan
- In office 1 February 2002 – 31 January 2008
- Constituency: Changhua County

Personal details
- Born: 2 August 1943 (age 82) Taichū Prefecture, Taiwan, Empire of Japan
- Party: Democratic Progressive Party
- Education: Tunghai University (BA); Middle Tennessee State University (MA)

Charles Chiang (Chinese: 江昭儀; born 2 August 1943) is a Taiwanese banker and politician.

== Education ==
Chiang graduated from Tunghai University with a bachelor's degree in economics and earned a Master of Arts (M.A.) in economics from Middle Tennessee State University in the United States.

== Career ==
Prior to his first legislative campaign in 2001, Chiang worked as a supervisor at First Commercial Bank. Bank chairman Jerome Chen was indicted in March 2001 of breach of trust, as Chen was found to have used bank resources in support of Chiang's campaign. Due to the controversy, Chiang resigned his role as a government advisor. On 23 September 2001, Chiang claimed to receive a faxed confession signed by Chang Chao-chuan, admitting to electoral fraud during the 2000 presidential election. After sending the evidence to the Ministry of Justice, Chiang filed suit against the Kuomintang in October.

In his first term as legislator, Chiang joined an "anti-betrayal alliance," which later became the Alliance Against Selling Out Taiwan. He was supportive of reductions to salaries of government workers. In 2003, Chiang asked the Judicial Yuan to offer an interpretation of a legislative resolution barring an increase on National Health Insurance premiums, which he believed to be non-binding. Later that year, Chiang and fellow legislator Lee Chen-nan accused Taipei Veterans General Hospital superintendent Chang Mau-song of corruption, leading to Chang's resignation. After the Referendum Act was promulgated, Lin Chin-hsing, Chai Trong-rong, and Chiang proposed in June 2004 that a referendum be held to decide the location of the capital. Such a referendum has yet to be held.

Chiang won reelection in December 2004. In his second term, he was named the leader of a group that acted as a liaison between the Legislative Yuan and US Congress. Chiang became critical of the government's financial supervisory agencies, especially the Financial Supervisory Commission. After Lee Chin-chen resigned due to allegations of insider trading, Chiang called for commission chairman Kong Jaw-sheng to step down also. After the FSC was unable to stop a bank run on Rebar Chinese Bank, Chiang berated Premier Su Tseng-chang over the scandal. In 2005, he proposed a bill in response to China's Anti-Secession Law. He was detained later that year while in Chiang Kai-shek International Airport, because he was there to protest Lien Chan's attendance of the Pan–Blue visits to mainland China.

Chiang lost a May 2007 party primary to Wei Ming-ku, and during the election, filed defamation lawsuits against Wei and Hsiao Bi-khim. He was named a Democratic Progressive Party candidate for a third time, but lost reelection in January 2008 to Kuomintang candidate Hsiao Ching-tien. Following the loss, Chiang was elected in May as DPP chapter director for Changhua County. He launched a legislative campaign in 2011, but did not win. Chiang was one of five potential candidates representing the Democratic Progressive Party in 2013 for the magistracy of Changhua County, a post that was won by Wei Ming-ku.
