= Taiwan Farmers' Party =

Taiwan Farmers' Party 台灣農民黨 Táiwān Nóngmín Dǎng (Mandarin) Thòi-vân Nùng-mìn Tóng (Hakka)
- Leader: Hsieh Yung-hui
- Founded: June 15, 2007
- Headquarters: Kaohsiung, Taiwan
- Ideology: Agrarianism; Centrism
- Political position: Centre-left

Website
- http://www.tfp.org.tw/

Taiwan Farmers' Party
- Traditional Chinese: 台灣農民黨
- Simplified Chinese: 台湾农民党
Transcriptions
Standard Mandarin
- Hanyu Pinyin: Táiwān nóngmín dǎng
Southern Min
- Hokkien POJ: Tâi-oân lông-bîn tóng

The Taiwan Farmers' Party (TFP; Chinese: 台灣農民黨; Pe̍h-ōe-jī: Tâi-oân lông-bîn tóng) is a minor party of Taiwan.

== History ==
The party was established on 15 June 2007.

== See also ==
- Agriculture in Taiwan
- Elections in Taiwan
- List of political parties in Taiwan
