= Taiwan Constitution Association =

Taiwan Constitution Association 制憲聯盟
- Founded: 8 November 2007
- Dissolved: 29 April 2020
- Ideology: Liberalism; Constitutionalism

Website
- http://estab.lawlove.org/

The Taiwan Constitution Association (TCA; Chinese: 制憲聯盟; pinyin: Zhìxiàn Liánméng; Pe̍h-ōe-jī: Chè-hiàn Liân-bêng) was a Taiwanese political party affiliated with the Pan-Green Coalition. The party was founded on 8 November 2007. It was dissolved on 29 April 2020.

== See also ==
- List of political parties in the Republic of China
