= Home Party =

2007–2019 political party in Taiwan

- Founded: October 2007
- Dissolved: 2019
- Headquarters: Taipei, Taiwan
- Ideology: Social democracy

Website
- www.homepartytw.org

The Home Party (Chinese: 紅黨; pinyin: Hóng Dǎng, literally "Red Party") was a minor party in the Republic of China (Taiwan), growing out of the "Million Voices Against Corruption, President Chen Must Go" campaign in 2006. It was dissolved in 2019.
