= Lin Shu-fen =

Taiwanese politician

Lin Shu-fen MLY
- 林淑芬
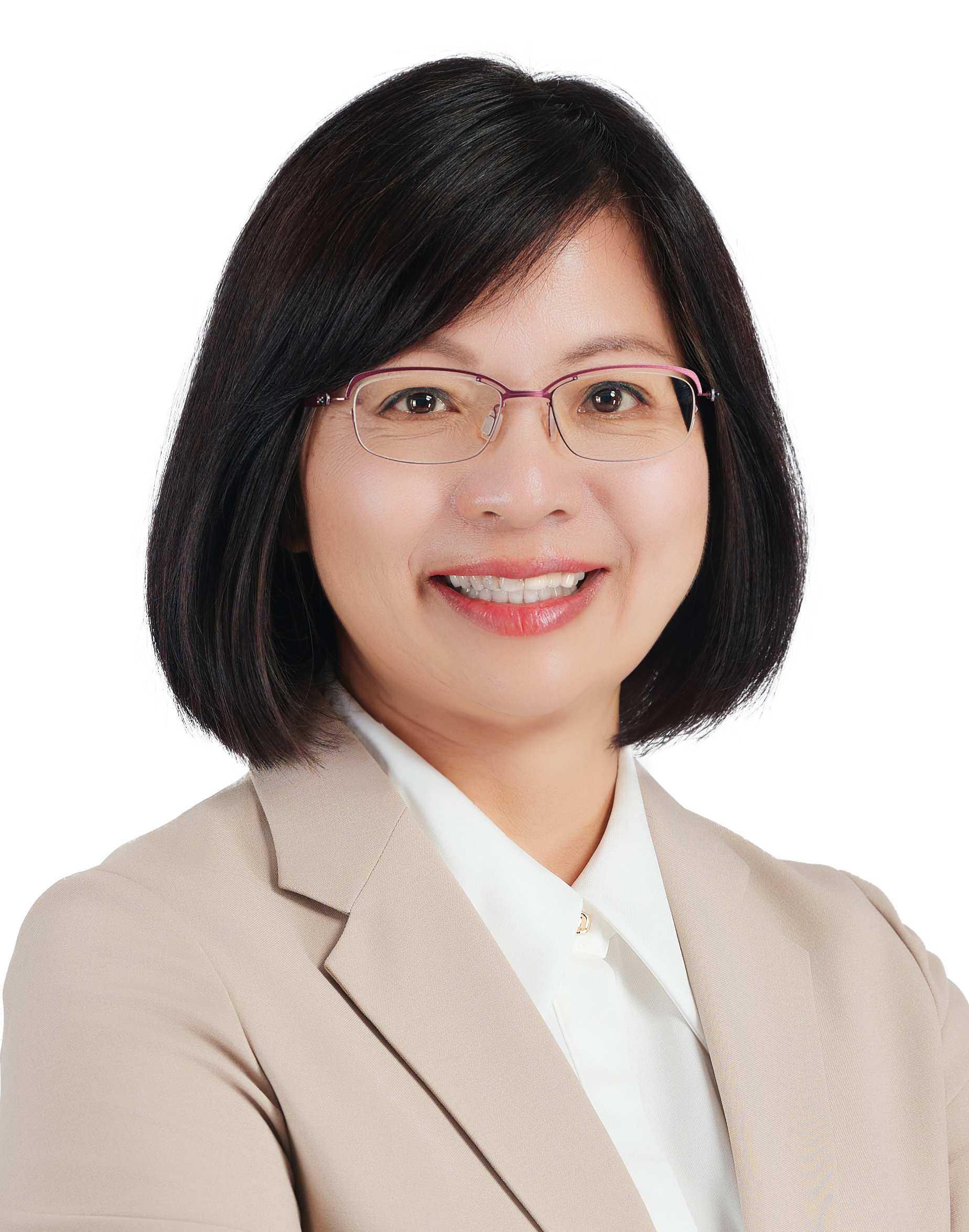
- Official portrait, 2024

Member of the Legislative Yuan
- Incumbent
- Assumed office 1 February 2008
- Preceded by: Constituency created
- Constituency: New Taipei II

Personal details
- Born: 17 January 1973 (age 53) Fenyuan, Changhua County, Taiwan
- Party: Democratic Progressive Party
- Education: Shih Hsin University (BA)

Lin Shu-fen (Chinese: 林淑芬; pinyin: Lín Shūfēn; Wade–Giles: Lin Shu-fen; born 17 January 1973) is a Taiwanese politician and member of the Democratic Progressive Party who is in the Legislative Yuan in Taiwan.

== Education ==
Lin obtained her bachelor's degree in social development from Shih Hsin University.

== Political careers ==
=== 2016 legislative election ===
Legislative Election 2016: New Taipei 2nd district
Party	Candidate	Votes	%	±%
DPP	Lin Shu-fen	123,299	68.75	
KMT	Chen Ming-yih	56,057	31.25	
Majority		67,242	37.50	
Total valid votes		179,356	97.62	
Rejected ballots		4,380	2.38	
DPP hold		Swing		
Turnout		183,736	66.88	
Registered electors		274,711		
