= Legislative Yuan constituencies in Taipei City =

There are 8 electoral constituencies in Taipei City (Chinese: 臺北市選舉區), each represented by a member of the Legislative Yuan.

== Current constituencies ==
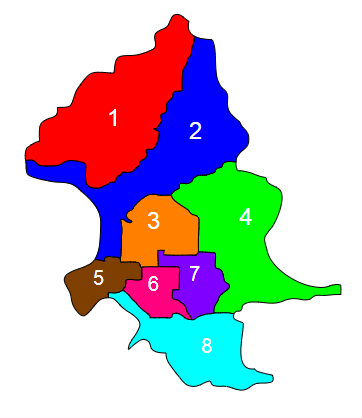
Map of Taipei's legislative districts

- Taipei City Constituency 1 - Beitou, Shilin (Lanya, Tianmu District)
- Taipei City Constituency 2 - Datong, Shilin (Shezi, Hougang, Jieshang, Zhishan, Yangmingshan district)
- Taipei City Constituency 3 - Zhongshan, Songshan (North Songshan, Dongshe, Sanmin district)
- Taipei City Constituency 4 - Neihu, Nangang
- Taipei City Constituency 5 - Wanhua, Zhongzheng (Wall of Taipei, Dongmen, Nanmen, Kanding district)
- Taipei City Constituency 6 - Daan
- Taipei City Constituency 7 - Xinyi, Songshan (South Songshan, Zhonglun, Benzhen district)
- Taipei City Constituency 8 - Wenshan, Zhongzheng (South Zhongzheng, Guting, Gongguan district)

== Legislators ==
Kuomintang Democratic Progressive Party New Power Party

Election	1	2	3	4	5	6	7	8
2008 7th	Ting Shou-chung	Justin Chou	Chiang Hsiao-yen	Alex Tsai Cheng-yuan	Lin Yu-fang	Diane Lee (2008-2009)^{1}	Alex Fai Hrong-tai	Lai Shyh-bao
2009 by-election	Ting Shou-chung	Justin Chou	Chiang Hsiao-yen	Alex Tsai Cheng-yuan	Lin Yu-fang	Chiang Nai-shin	Alex Fai Hrong-tai	Lai Shyh-bao
2012 8th	Ting Shou-chung	Pasuya Yao (2012-2018)^{2}	Lo Shu-lei	Alex Tsai Cheng-yuan	Lin Yu-fang	Chiang Nai-shin	Alex Fai Hrong-tai	Lai Shyh-bao
2016 9th	Rosalia Wu	Pasuya Yao (2012-2018)^{2}	Chiang Wan-an	Li Yen-hsiu	Freddy Lim	Chiang Nai-shin	Alex Fai Hrong-tai	Lai Shyh-bao
2019 by-election	Rosalia Wu	Mark Ho	Chiang Wan-an	Li Yen-hsiu	Freddy Lim	Chiang Nai-shin	Alex Fai Hrong-tai	Lai Shyh-bao
2020 10th	Rosalia Wu	Mark Ho	Chiang Wan-an	Kao Chia-yu	Freddy Lim	Lin Yi-hua(2020-2023)^{3}	Alex Fai Hrong-tai	Lai Shyh-bao
2022 by-election	Rosalia Wu	Mark Ho	Wang Hung-wei	Kao Chia-yu	Freddy Lim	Vacant	Alex Fai Hrong-tai	Lai Shyh-bao
2024 10th	Rosalia Wu	Wang Shih-chien	Wang Hung-wei	Li Yen-hsiu	Wu Pei-yi	Lo Chih-chiang	Hsu Chiao-hsin	Lai Shyh-bao

Diane Lee resigned in 2009 due to citizenship issues.

Pasuya Yao resigned in 2018 to focus on his Taipei mayoral election campaign.

Lin Yi-hua resigned in 2023 to become Taipei deputy mayor.

== Election results ==
=== 2024 ===
2024 legislative election
		Elected			Runner-up		
Incumbent	Constituency	Candidate	Party	Votes (%)	Candidate	Party	Votes (%)
DPP; Rosalia Wu	1	Rosalia Wu	DPP	47.22%	Chang Szu-kang	Kuomintang	36.89%
DPP; Ho Chih-wei	2	Wang Shih-chien	DPP	60.53%	Yu Shu-hui	Kuomintang	37.83%
Kuomintang; Wang Hung-wei	3	Wang Hung-wei	Kuomintang	52.52%	Hsieh Pei-fen	DPP	44.92%
DPP; Kao Chia-yu	4	Li Yen-hsiu	Kuomintang	47.64%	Kao Chia-yu	DPP	40.24%
DPP; Freddy Lin	5	Wu Pei-yi	DPP	39.81%	Chung Hsiao-ping	Kuomintang	34.28%
Vacant	6	Lo Chih-chiang	Kuomintang	52.96%	Miao Po-ya	Social Democratic Party	44.78%
Kuomintang; Alex Fei Hrong-tai	7	Hsu Chiao-hsin	Kuomintang	52.62%	Hsu Shu-hua	DPP	44.64%
Kuomintang; Lai Shyh-bao	8	Lai Shyh-bao	Kuomintang	47.46%	Wang Min-sheng	DPP	32.42%

=== 2020 ===
2020 legislative election
		Elected			Runner-up		
Incumbent	Constituency	Candidate	Party	Votes (%)	Candidate	Party	Votes (%)
DPP; Rosalia Wu	1	Rosalia Wu	DPP	52.12%	Wang Chih-ping	Kuomintang	40.38%
DPP; Ho Chih-wei	2	Ho Chih-wei	DPP	62.87%	Sun Ta-chien	Kuomintang	34.91%
Kuomintang; Chiang Wan-an	3	Chiang Wan-an	Kuomintang	51.44%	Enoch Wu	DPP	45.40%
Kuomintang; Li Yen-hsiu	4	Kao Chia-yu	DPP	50.12%	Li Yen-hsiu	Kuomintang	47.44%
Independent; Freddy Lin	5	Freddy Lin	Independent	44.91%	Lin Yu-fang	Kuomintang	41.94%
Kuomintang; Chiang Nai-shin	6	Lin Yi-hua	Kuomintang	52.41%	Hsieh Pei-fen	DPP	42.32%
Kuomintang; Alex Fei Hrong-tai	7	Alex Fei Hrong-tai	Kuomintang	46.28%	Hsu Shu-hua	DPP	43.00%
Kuomintang; Lai Shyh-bao	8	Lai Shyh-bao	Kuomintang	49.98%	Juan Chao-hsiung	DPP	34.99%

=== 2019 By-election ===
2019 By-election
		Elected			Runner-up		
Incumbent	Constituency	Candidate	Party	Votes (%)	Candidate	Party	Votes (%)
DPP; Pasuya Yao	2	Ho Chih-wei	DPP	47.76%	Chen Bing-fu	Kuomintang	39.03%

=== 2016 ===
2016 legislative election
		Elected			Runner-up		
Incumbent	Constituency	Candidate	Party	Votes (%)	Candidate	Party	Votes (%)
Kuomintang; Ting Shou-chung	1	Rosalia Wu	DPP	50.82%	Ting Shou-chung	Kuomintang	43.77%
DPP; Pasuya Yao	2	Pasuya Yao	DPP	59.29%	Pan Huai-zong	New Party	36.43%
Kuomintang; Lo Shu-lei	3	Chiang Wan-an	Kuomintang	46.68%	Billy Pan	Independent	38.42%
Kuomintang; Alex Tsai	4	Lee Yen-hsiu	Kuomintang	41.74%	Huang Shanshan	People First Party	39.87%
Kuomintang; Lin Yu-fang	5	Freddy Lim	New Power Party	49.52%	Lin Yu-fang	Kuomintang	45.59%
Kuomintang; Chiang Nai-shin	6	Chiang Nai-shin	Kuomintang	46.10%	Fan Yun	SDP	35.36%
Kuomintang; Alex Fei Hrong-tai	7	Alex Fei Hrong-tai	Kuomintang	45.05%	Yang Shih-chiu	Independent	42.28%
Kuomintang; Lai Shyh-bao	8	Lai Shyh-bao	Kuomintang	49.70%	Li Ching-yuan	Independent	35.80%
