= Ting Shou-chung =

- 丁守中
- Ting in 2013

Member of the Legislative Yuan
- In office 1 February 2005 – 31 January 2016
- Succeeded by: Wu Szu-yao
- Constituency: Taipei City Constituency I
- In office 1 February 1990 – 31 January 2002
- Constituency: Taipei City First Constituency

Personal details
- Born: September 1, 1954 (age 72) Kaohsiung, Taiwan
- Party: Kuomintang
- Spouse: Wen Tzu-ling
- Children: 2
- Education: National Taiwan University (BA); Tufts University (MA, PhD)

Ting Shou-chung (Chinese: 丁守中; born 1 September 1954) is a Taiwanese political scientist and politician. A member of the Kuomintang (KMT), he served seven terms as a member of the Legislative Yuan between 1990 and 2016. He held several senior positions within the KMT, including membership of its Central Standing Committee and leadership of its Taipei branch and Organizational Development Committee.

Ting unsuccessfully sought the KMT nomination for mayor of Taipei four times before securing the nomination in 2018. He lost the 2018 Taipei mayoral election to incumbent mayor Ko Wen-je by 3,567 votes following a recount, and his subsequent legal challenge to the election result was rejected by the courts.

== Early life and education ==
Tingwas born in 1954 in Kaohsiung, Taiwan, where he was raised in residential quarters attached to a military hospital, the 802 General Hospital of the Republic of China Army. His father, Ting Chien (丁堅), was a native of Yiwu, Zhejiang, who served in the National Revolutionary Army during the Second Sino-Japanese War and became director of the 802 General Hospital in Kaohsiung. His mother, Huang Li (黃莉), was from Jiangxi and had fled mainland China with Ting's elder sister before reuniting with his father in the Penghu islands following the Chinese Civil War.

As a child, Ting was raised in a military dependents' village surrounding the hospital. He attended elementary school and middle school in Kaohsiung before graduating from Kaohsiung Senior High School. He then enrolled at National Taiwan University, where he studied political science. As an undergraduate, he received the university's academic merit award for four consecutive semesters and was awarded a scholarship from Dai-Ichi Kangyo Bank for being the highest-ranking student in the department. He graduated with a bachelor's degree in political science in 1976.

After graduation, Ting began graduate studies in political science at NTU but took a leave of absence after one year to sit the national examination for diplomatic and consular personnel. After passing the examination, he joined the Ministry of Foreign Affairs as a social affairs officer, but soon resigned to pursue graduate studies in the United States. He earned a Master of Arts in law and diplomacy in 1981 and his Ph.D. in international politics in 1985 from the Fletcher School of Law and Diplomacy at Tufts University. As a doctoral student, he became the editor-in-chief of Boston Communication (波士頓通訊), a periodical published by Taiwanese students in the Boston area.

== Academic career ==
After receiving his doctorate, Ting became an associate professor of political science at National Taiwan University. He held a full-time appointment at the university from 1985 to 1990, after which he continued to teach as an adjunct associate professor. Alongside his teaching, Ting was a contributor to four Taiwanese newspapers on political topics.

Ting was a visiting scholar at the Hoover Institution at Stanford University in 2001. He was also a visiting scholar at the Fairbank Center for Chinese Studies at Harvard University in 2016. His other research appointments included an affiliation as a special research fellow at the Institute of International Relations of National Chengchi University. Ting also served as president of the Chinese Association for International Education Research and the Chinese Youth Cultural and Educational Association. He was additionally a member of the board of trustees of Fo Guang University.

In June 2012, Ting published the English-language monograph The Dilemma of Disintegration: Nationalist China's Policy Toward Japan, 1931–1937 through Airiti Press. The book examines the development of Chiang Kai-shek's policy of prioritizing domestic unification before armed resistance to Japanese expansion during the years preceding the Second Sino-Japanese War.

== Political career ==
=== Early political career and Legislative Yuan (1990–2002) ===
Ting entered the Legislative Yuan in February 1990 following his election in 1989, representing Taipei City's First Constituency. He was the elected to the second, third and fourth Legislative Yuan, serving continuously until January 2002.

During his early legislative career, Ting served as a convener of the Legislative Yuan's National Defense Committee. His other activities included chairing the Cross-Strait Development Research Foundation and serving as executive director of the Democracy Foundation.

Ting became involved in the KMT's national organizational affairs, serving as director of the party's Central Youth Working Committee and as a member of its Central Committee and Central Standing Committee. He also served as the KMT's deputy executive director for central policy affairs.

After failing to secure re-election in the 2001 Taiwanese legislative election, Ting became chairman of the KMT's Taipei City branch under party leader Lien Chan. He subsequently served as director of the party's Organizational Development Committee, a position he held during the controversy surrounding the 2004 Taiwanese presidential election.

=== Return to the legislature (2005–2016) ===
Ting returned to the Legislative Yuan in February 2005 after winning election to the sixth legislature, again representing Taipei City's First Constituency. During this term, he served on the National Defense, Internal Administration, and Budget and Final Accounts committees.

In the 2008 Taiwanese legislative election, Ting won a seat in Taipei City's First Constituency under the newly implemented single-member district electoral system. During the seventh legislature, he served on the Economic Committee, including a term as its convener.

In May 2012, Ting proposed a KMT caucus resolution intended to strengthen coordination between the executive and legislative branches, although critics argued that it would restrict the independence of KMT lawmakers.

Ting was re-elected to the eighth Legislative Yuan in 2012, serving on its Economic and Constitutional Amendment committees. In January 2016, his legislative career ended when Rosalia Wu of the Democratic Progressive Party (DPP) defeated him in Taipei City's First Constituency, receiving 95,951 votes.

== Taipei mayoral campaigns ==
=== Early attempts at the KMT nomination (1994–2006) ===
Ting sought the KMT nomination for mayor of Taipei during the 1994, 1998 and 2006 election cycles but was unsuccessful on each occasion.

In 2006, Ting competed in the KMT primary against former Environmental Protection Administration administrator Hau Lung-bin. Although Ting received 10,730 votes from party members compared with Hau's 6,412, Hau prevailed in opinion polling and won the nomination with an overall score of 59.68 percent to Ting's 40.31 percent. Ting initially questioned the fairness of the primary's formula, which assigned 70 percent of the final score to public opinion polling and 30 percent to voting by party members. On 29 May, he conceded defeat while continuing to criticize the party's nomination system.

=== 2014 Taipei mayoral primary ===
In November 2012, Ting announced his intention to seek the KMT nomination for the 2014 Taipei mayoral election. The primary also featured a dispute after KMT legislator Alex Tsai withdrew from the contest and urged his supporters to back Lien, a move criticized by Ting. On 19 April 2014, Lien secured the nomination with a combined score of 48.19 percent, compared with Ting's 35.018 percent, following a primary process combining opinion polling and party-member voting.

=== 2018 Taipei mayoral election ===
==== Nomination and campaign ====
On 2 May 2018, Ting won the KMT primary for the Taipei mayoral election with an average polling support rate of 47.634 percent, defeating former legislators Sun Ta-chien and Vincent Chang, as well as Taipei City Councilor Chung Hsiao-ping. The nomination marked his first successful bid for the KMT's Taipei mayoral candidacy after four previous unsuccessful attempts.

==== Election result and recount ====
The election was held on 24 November 2018, with Ting facing incumbent mayor Ko Wen-je, DPP legislator Pasuya Yao and two other independent candidates. The initial count gave Ko 580,820 votes and Ting 577,566 votes, a margin of 3,254 votes.

Ting challenged the election result, arguing that simultaneous voting and vote counting had potentially affected voter behavior and compromised the fairness of the contest. He initially requested a recount before withdrawing the application, but subsequently submitted a renewed request to the Taipei District Court.

The court-supervised recount began on 3 December and concluded on 11 December 2018. On 13 December, the Taipei District Court announced revised totals of 580,663 votes for Ko and 577,096 votes for Ting, increasing Ko's margin of victory to 3,567 votes.

==== Legal challenges ====
On 11 December 2018, Ting filed a lawsuit seeking to invalidate the mayoral election, alleging irregularities in the administration and counting of votes.

On 10 May 2019, the Taipei District Court dismissed Ting's lawsuit challenging the election result. Ting criticized the ruling and indicated that he would consider appealing the decision.

On 17 December 2019, the Taiwan High Court upheld the lower court's decision, finding that Ting had failed to establish that the alleged irregularities were sufficient to invalidate the election. The High Court's judgment was final because lawsuits challenging election results could be appealed only once.

== Personal life ==
Ting is married to Wen Tzu-ling (溫子苓), a musician. The couple have two sons, both of whom supported his campaign during the 2018 Taipei mayoral election.
