= Taipei City Constituency 6 =

Constituency of the Legislative Yuan of Taiwan

Taipei City Constituency VI
- Single-member constituency for the Legislative Yuan
- District(s): Daan

Current constituency
- Created: 2008
- Members: Diane Lee Ching-an (2008–2009); Chiang Nai-shin (2009–2020); Lin Yi-Hua (2020–2023)

Taipei City Constituency VI (Chinese: 臺北市第六選舉區; pinyin: Táiběi Shì Dì-liù Xuǎnjǔ Qū) includes all of Daan in central Taipei. The district was created in 2008, when all local constituencies of the Legislative Yuan were reorganized to become single-member districts.

== Current district ==
- Daan

== Legislators ==
Representative	Party	Dates	Notes
Diane Lee Ching-an	Kuomintang	2008–2009	
Chiang Nai-shin	Kuomintang	2009–2020	
Lin Yi-hua	Kuomintang	2020–2023	(Note: Transferred to Deputy Mayor of Taipei City in February, 2023.)
Lo Chih-chiang	Kuomintang	2024–present	

== Election results ==
=== 2016 ===
Legislative Election 2016: Taipei City Constituency VI
Party	Candidate	Votes	%	±%
KMT	Chiang Nai-shin (蔣乃辛)	74,015	46.10	
Social Democratic Party	Fan Yun (范雲)	56,766	35.36	
Minkuotang	Wu Hsu-chih (吳旭智)	5,962	3.71	
People's Democratic Front	Cheng Tsun-chi (鄭村棋)	4,927	3.07	
Faith And Hope League	Zeng Xianying (曾獻瑩)	4,826	3.01	
Independent	Chou Fang-ju (周芳如)	4,120	2.57	
Independent	Chao Yan-ching (趙衍慶)	3,212	2.00	
Independent	Pang Weiling (龎維良)	2,963	1.85	
Trees	Chen Chia-hung (陳家宏)	1,986	1.24	
Taiwan Independence Party	Lin Zhenyu (林珍妤)	1,328	0.83	
Independent	Jiang Weici (蔣慰慈)	271	0.17	
Taiwan Constitution Association	Peter Ku (古文發)	184	0.11	
Majority		17,249	10.74	
Total valid votes		160,560	98.02	
Rejected ballots		3,248	1.98	
KMT hold		Swing		
Turnout		163,808	66.72	
Registered electors		245,521		

=== 2020 ===
Legislative Election 2020: Taipei City Constituency VI
Party	Candidate	Votes	%	±%
KMT	Lin Yi-hua (林奕華)	93,785	52.41	▲6.31
DPP	Hsieh Pei-fen (謝佩芬)	75,718	42.32	New
Chinese Women's Party	Meng Ai-lun (孟藹倫)	3,507	1.96	New
Statebuilding	Yeh Ri-chin (葉日勤)	1,508	0.84	New
TRP	Shen Yi-hsuan (沈宜璇)	1,267	0.71	New
Independent	Yang You-kai (楊攸凱)	964	0.54	New
Independent	Hsiao Ruei-lin (蕭瑞麟)	739	0.41	New
Labor Party	Luo Shi-hao (羅世晧)	677	0.38	New
Formosa Alliance	Chang Yu-chian (張余健)	589	0.33	New
Independent	Huang Tian-ben (黃典本)	177	0.10	New
Majority		18,067	10.10	▼0.64
Total valid votes		178,931	98.06	
Rejected ballots		3,543	1.94	
KMT hold		Swing		
Turnout		182,474	74.81	▲8.09
Registered electors		243,908		

=== 2024 ===
Legislative Election 2024: Taipei City Constituency VI
Party	Candidate	Votes	%	±%
KMT	Lo Chih-chiang (羅智強)	87,973	52.96	▲0.55
SDP	Miao Po-ya (苗博雅)	74,375	44.78	New
MiLinguall Party	Tsui Chien-chang (崔建章)	2,202	1.33	New
Institutional Island of Saving the World	Chang Hsueh-ching (張雪卿)	896	0.54	New
TRP	Jhu Yi-ming (朱翊銘)	660	0.40	▼0.31
Total valid votes		166,106	97.40	
Rejected ballots		4,435	2.60	
KMT hold		Swing		
Turnout		170,541	73.15	▼1.66
Registered electors		233,123		
