= Alice Wang =

Taiwanese politician (born 1964)

Wang Hsueh-fung MLY
- 王雪峰

Member of the Legislative Yuan
- In office 1 February 1999 – 31 January 2005
- Constituency: Taipei 1
- In office 1 February 1996 – 31 January 1999
- Constituency: Taipei 2

Member of the National Assembly
- In office 1 February 1992 – 31 January 1996

Personal details
- Born: 26 August 1964 (age 62)
- Party: Democratic Progressive Party
- Spouse: Wang Tsuo-liang (m. 2002)
- Parent(s): Wang Kun-ho (father); Kao Li-chun (mother)
- Education: National Taiwan University (LLB); Cornell University (LLM)
- Profession: Lawyer

Wang Hsueh-fung (Chinese: 王雪峰; born 26 August 1964), also known by her English name Alice Wang, is a Taiwanese politician who served in the Legislative Yuan from 1996 to 2005.

== Early life and education ==
Wang was born to parents Wang Kun-ho and Kao Li-chun. Both her father Wang Kun-ho and younger brother Wang Po-yu have served on the Taipei City Council.

After graduating from Taipei Private Yan Ping High School, Wang attended law school at National Taiwan University, where she advocated for the democratization of Taiwan as a student activist. After earning a Bachelor of Laws (LL.B.), Wang continued her legal education at Cornell University in the United States and obtained a Master of Laws (LL.M.) from Cornell Law School. She worked as a lawyer and also taught at Tamkang University and National Open University.

== Political career ==
She won a seat on the National Assembly in 1991, taking office the next year at the age of 28. She ran for the Legislative Yuan in 1995, winning reelection twice thereafter in 1998 and 2001. During her 2001 campaign, she expressed clear support for downsizing the legislature, but broke with the Democratic Progressive Party by criticizing the vote allocation scheme in place that year. In 2002, Wang pushed the DPP to nominate Yeh Chu-lan as its candidate for the Taipei mayoralty. Instead, Yeh remained head of the Hakka Affairs Council until 2004.

As a legislator, Wang was noted for her speaking out on mental and public health issues, including tobacco consumption and drunk driving. In 2000, she helped draw attention to conditions at the Lungfatang psychiatric care center in Kaohsiung County.

== Personal life ==
Wang co-founded a legislative group for unmarried female parliamentarians in 2002, but left the group after marrying Wang Tsuo-liang in May 2002. It was reported in 2009 that Wang and her husband were earning money from the collection of recyclables. In January 2010, Alice Wang petitioned the Xindian bench of the Taipei District Court to grant her a restraining order against Wang Tsuo-liang, citing verbal and physical abuse.
