= Miao Poya =

Taiwanese politician

- Official portrait, 2018

Taipei City Councilor
- Incumbent
- Assumed office 25 December 2018
- Constituency: District 6 (Da'an & Wenshan)

Personal details
- Born: 2 October 1987 (age 39) Muzha District, Taiwan
- Party: Social Democratic Party
- Education: National Taiwan University (LLB)

Chinese name
- Traditional Chinese: 苗博雅
- Simplified Chinese: 苗博雅
Transcriptions
Standard Mandarin
- Hanyu Pinyin: Miáo Bóyǎ
- Bopomofo: ㄇㄧㄠˊ ㄅㄛˊ ㄧㄚˇ
- Wade–Giles: Miao^{2} Po^{2}-ya^{3}
Southern Min
- Hokkien POJ: Biâu Phok-ngá

Miao Poya (Chinese: 苗博雅; pinyin: Miáo Bóyǎ; Wade–Giles: Miao^{²} Po^{²}-ya^{³}; born 2 October 1987) is a Taiwanese politician and activist for humanitarianism, anti-death penalty, social feminism, LGBT rights and Taiwanese independence, also known for being one of Taiwan's first-ever openly lesbian council members. She was elected as councillor representing Taipei City District 6 during the 2018 local elections.

== Early life and education ==
Miao was born as a second generation in a waishengren family at the time when the long Martial Law period ended in 1987, and grew up in Wenshan District, Taipei. She attended Jingxin Elementary and Middle School and Taipei First Girls' High School. While a high school student, Miao was elected class president and successfully campaigned for a change in the seasonal uniform policy, so students could wear trousers all year round instead of having to wear a skirt in the summer. Miao studied law at National Taiwan University, where she began developing her political views away from her pro-government family.

== Social activism and political career ==
After university, Miao worked for a law firm dealing with cases from tech start-ups and then as a social movement worker in the Taiwan Alliance to End the Death Penalty, having encountered the topic of the death penalty many times in high school debate competitions.

Miao first ran for office in the 2016 Taiwanese legislative elections, after having joined the Social Democratic Party (SDP) during its formation, and with the support of the SDP's founder Fan Yun. She failed to win, but gained 12.1% of the vote (21,000 votes) and was the most successful non-Blue and non-Green candidate.

Miao ran for city councilor in the 2018 Taiwanese local elections, again representing the SDP. Issues she advocated for include the protections for workers, the care for children and the elderly, and Taiwanese sovereignty and independence. She was elected, and thus became one of Taiwan's first openly lesbian council members, alongside Lin Ying-meng of the New Power Party.

Miao's candidacy for Taipei 6 in the 2024 legislative election was backed by the Social Democratic Party and the Democratic Progressive Party.

Miao was one of the activists who proposed a referendum in favor of same-sex marriage in Taiwan, and sympathizes with the democracy, freedom and human rights concern in Mainland China, Hong Kong and Tibet.

== Legacy ==
=== Supporting the languages development act ===
The 2018 Development of National Languages Act stipulates the government agencies to provide interpretation services when citizens participating in administrative, legislative, and judicial procedures can freely choose to use their national languages, so the Legislative Yuan activated the interpreter service for the parliament session in real time accordingly. On 27 September 2021, after following the steps to apply in advance with 3 Taiwanese interpreters been present ready, Legislator, Chen Po-wei of the Taiwan Statebuilding Party proceeded his scheduled questioning in Taiwanese during the session of Foreign and National Defense Committee. Minister of National Defense Chiu Kuo-cheng rejected to speak Taiwanese, nor accepted the interpreter's real-time service at site, but brought the deputy minister Zong-hsiao Li as his own interpreter, and insisted in the 3-way translation pattern sentence by sentence. Chiu repeatedly interrupted the question process by asking Chen to speak Mandarin Chinese for easier communication, or the session time cannot be lengthened to accommodate the interpretation, but Li is not a linguistic professional, hence his translation contains contextual errors, so Chairman Chen I-hsin intervened when the argument occurred, and introduced the existing synchronized interpretation in progress as the solution same as the common conference practice in the other countries; but Chiu never picked up the earset, yet insisted his way till the session run out of time. Chen later apologized to the public for the good intention of practicing the national language law being turned into a linguistic communication tragedy, and condemned Chiu for "bullying" (鴨霸), but Chiu denied the allegation and claimed that a language is a tool of communication. The parliamentary interpretation service were temporarily suspended afterwards pending on better communication in the future - consequently the parliament members and media editorials such as Kuan Bi-ling and Taipei Times commented that Language is not just a tool of communication as Chiu said, but also an identity of feelings and culture. Miao also explained that the multi-lingual working environment is essential for a healthy mind without the "Mandarin Supremacy" (華語至上) attitude to achieve the international level in diversity, equality and mutual respect for a modern state.
