= Justin Chou =

Justin Chou may refer to:

- Justin Chou (politician) (born 1966), Taiwanese politician
- Justin Chou (fashion designer) (born 1977), Taiwanese fashion designer
