= Murder of Weng Chi-nan =

2010 murder in Taichung City, Taiwan

- Date: 28 May 2010
- Time: 4:20 PM
- Location: Taichung City, Taiwan
- Deaths: 2
- Accused: Liao Kuo-Hao
- Convicted: 19 January 2011
- Charges: Murder (2 counts); Attempted murder; Possession of illegal weapons
- Verdict: 30-year imprisonment

Weng Chi-nan (Chinese: 翁奇楠; pinyin: Wēng Qínán) was murdered on 28 May 2010 in Taichung City, Taiwan. Weng, described as a gangster, was shot seven times after he walked into his office. One of Weng's associates, Lai Jung-chen (賴榮振; Lài Róngzhèn) was injured during the shooting and died four days later. Since four police officers were present at Weng's office during the murder, but took no action, they were suspected of having gang ties.

== Murder ==
Yang Ding-jung (楊定融; Yáng Dìngróng) was convicted of orchestrating the assassination. He hired Liao Kuo-hao (廖國豪; Liào Guóháo) to carry out the murder.

Liao purchased a used black Mitsubishi in Hsinchu County which was later used as the getaway vehicle. On the day before the murder, Liao checked into the RO Motel on the outskirts of Taichung City and told Lin Ying-hao (林英豪; Lín Yīngháo) he would kill Weng the next day. Liao gave Lin a pistol for his defense as the getaway car driver.

On 28 May, Liao waited near Weng's office in Taichung City's Da-dun 10th Street. When Weng walked into his office at 4:19PM, security video showed Liao followed Weng into the office approximately 30 seconds later, where Liao fired sixteen shots, striking Weng seven times. After the shooting, Lin drove Liao away, abandoning the car near Sun Moon Lake, where it was found by police on 29 May. Liao was picked up by Huang Jun-long in Taipin Township and driven to a hideout in northern Taiwan, scattering pieces of the dismantled murder weapons along the way.

In Weng's obituary, his family complained the four policemen present did not move to protect Weng, and possibly locked the office door, denying Weng an escape route. Liao had run out of bullets and he returned to the getaway car to retrieve a loaded weapon. The policemen stated they were unarmed and not aware that a shooting was taking place.

== Investigations and arrests ==
=== Yang Ding-jung ===
Yang Ding-jung, a rival gangster, was arrested after returning from China on 26 June 2010 as the alleged planner of the murder. Police found that Yang and the accused gunman, Liao Kuo-hao, had exchanged phone calls on 27 May 2010. Yang had fled to Xiamen on 28 May 2010. Although some suspected Yang of acting as a middleman to arrange the murder for higher-level gangsters, he was sentenced to life imprisonment for manslaughter; his sentence was upheld by the Taiwan Supreme Court in 2012.

=== Drivers ===
Chang Yu-hao (張育豪; Zhāng Yùháo) and Su Kuan-yu (蘇寬裕; Sū Kuānyù) were separately arrested as suspects involved in the stolen vehicle used to transport the gunman, who was identified as Liao Kuo-hao. Su was accused of having driven a stolen vehicle from Hsinchu to Taichung, and Chang was accused of being the driver who transported Liao to and from Weng's office. Both were later released for insufficient evidence tying them to the crimes.

Lin Ying-hao was arrested on 13 August 2010 and confessed to being the driver who transported Liao to Weng's office. Huang Jun-long was identified as the driver who picked up Liao and took him to his hideout in northern Taiwan.

=== Liao Kuo-hao ===
Although Liao was identified as the gunman in June 2010, he eluded police until he turned himself in on 25 August 2010. Liao contacted politician Justin Chou to arrange his surrender in Taipei. After he was taken into custody, he confessed to being the gunman in the Weng murder.

Liao's parents divorced early in his life, and his father was in and out of jail. Raised by his grandparents, he dropped out of junior high school and blamed the education system for his actions, although a school official cited numerous instances where they attempted to contact his grandparents and uncle. Liao ran errands for Weng, who reputedly had a bad temper and a stingy nature, prompting him to leave Weng's service for Yang's employ.

He was charged with two counts of murder for the deaths of Weng and Lai. Since he turned 18 after the murders (born 18 June 1992 (age 34)), he was not eligible for capital punishment. Liao stated he killed Weng because he was unhappy with the way Weng had treated him:

- Weng failed to pay Liao NT$4 million as a "hitman fee" after failing to kill Zhao Jun-yu (趙俊宇; Zhào Jùnyǔ), a Taichung restaurant owner on 19 January 2009.
- Weng gave three guns to Liao and asked him to kill another gang boss as a "suicide mission."
- Weng threatened to turn Liao in to the authorities after the "suicide mission" failed.

On 19 January 2011, Liao was sentenced to twenty-five years in prison as a combined sentence for three crimes: the two murders and the attempted murder of the restaurant owner. His sentence was increased to thirty years' imprisonment in July 2010 since he was in possession of an illegal weapon, and a fine of NT$1.2 million was imposed for the murder and weapons charges. The Taiwan Supreme Court upheld the July verdict in December 2011.

=== Police corruption ===
The four officers stated they went to Weng's office solely to drink tea with a fellow retired officer, who vehemently denied any gang ties. They later stated they were not aware the office was Weng's, and that they were unable to intervene because they were unarmed. However, it was later discovered they had played mahjong with Weng. The two senior officers present during the murder were given demerits for misconduct and were transferred to other police departments. Archived video footage showed that nine police officers visited Weng's office between 22 and 28 May 2010.

The Taichung Police Commissioner, Hu Mu-yuan (胡木源) resigned on 3 June 2010, partly because he did not report the case to the National Police Agency and Taichung City Mayor Jason Hu until several days after the murder occurred and partly because of the poor quality of the police report, although the presence of police officers during the shooting led many to suspect police corruption. Later investigations revealed that Weng was indeed closely connected with the Taichung City Police Department, prompting the issue of a new rule governing relationships between police and gang members. At the time, Taichung was well known for having a high crime rate, potentially due to police corruption. Although the crime rate in Taichung decreased later in 2010, critics would continue to criticize Mayor Hu's efforts to reduce crimes throughout his tenure.
