= Alice Kao =

Taiwanese journalist and politician

Alice Kao (Chinese: 高惠宇; born 1947) is a Taiwanese journalist and politician.

== Education and career ==
Kao attended Xingya Elementary School and Mingchuan Elementary School, both in Taipei, before graduating from Taipei First Girls' High School. By the time she was in high school, Kao had made it her goal to become a journalist. Though she did well on the Joint College Entrance Examination, she was assigned to National Taiwan Normal University and trained as a teacher. After earning her bachelor's degree, Kao taught for two years, and found that she did not enjoy the job. Kao then passed the examinations required by the Ministry of Education to pursue studies overseas. Kao enrolled at the University of Utah in the United States. Before completing her master's degree there, Kao began applying for journalism positions in Taiwan. The United Daily News was the only publication to respond to her application. She began working for the newspaper in January 1975, and in time, became the first woman to cover political news for the paper and the first woman to lead its political news section. Kao received the Nieman Fellowship in 1983, and took courses at Harvard Kennedy School. Upon her return to Taiwan, Kao served as city editor for the United Daily News. She was again the first woman to assume that position at the paper. By the 1990s, Kao was deputy editor-in-chief of the United Daily News.

Kao was elected to the Legislative Yuan in 1995 with 8.44% of the vote from Taipei 1, as a member of the New Party. She remained affiliated with the New Party as she sought reelection in 1998 and 2001, but her vote share decreased in each election cycle.
