= Taipei City Constituency 4 =

Constituency of the Legislative Yuan of Taiwan

Taipei City Constituency IV
- Single-member constituency for the Legislative Yuan
- District(s): Neihu and Nangang

Current constituency
- Created: 2008
- Members: Alex Tsai (2008–2016); Lee Yen-hsiu (2016–2020); Kao Chia-yu (2020–2024); Lee Yen-hsiu (2024-)

Taipei City Constituency IV (Chinese: 臺北市第四選舉區; pinyin: Táiběi Shì Dì-sì Xuǎnjǔ Qū) includes all of Neihu and Nangang in eastern Taipei. The district was created in 2008, when all local constituencies of the Legislative Yuan were reorganized to become single-member districts.

== Current district ==
- Neihu
- Nangang

== Legislators ==
Representative	Party	Dates	Notes
Alex Tsai	Kuomintang	2008–2016	
Lee Yen-hsiu	Kuomintang	2016–2020	
Kao Chia-yu	Democratic Progressive Party	2020–2024	
Lee Yen-hsiu	Kuomintang	2024–	Incumbent

== Election results ==
=== 2008 ===
Legislative Election 2008: Taipei City Constituency IV
Party	Candidate	Votes	%	±%
KMT	Alex Tsai （蔡正元）	105,375	62.26	
DPP	Hsu Kuo-yung （徐國勇）	60,004	35.45	
Independent	Zhuang Wanjun （莊婉均）	1,684	0.99	
Green	Ke Yimin（柯逸民）	1,580	0.93	
Independent	Zhang Qingyuan（張慶源）	470	0.28	
Independent	Xu Jiachen （許家琛）	159	0.09	
Majority		45,371	26.81	
Total valid votes		169,272	98.61	
Rejected ballots		2,393	1.39	
KMT win (new seat)				
Turnout		171,665	61.17	
Registered electors		280,614		

=== 2012 ===
Legislative Election 2012: Taipei City Constituency IV
Party	Candidate	Votes	%	±%
KMT	Alex Tsai （蔡正元）	111,260	48.23	▼14.03
DPP	Lee Chien-chang （李建昌）	78,097	33.85	▼1.60
People First	Huang Shan-shan （黃珊珊）	39,593	17.16	New
The People Union Party	Zang Jiayi (臧家宜)	1,745	0.76	New
Majority		33,163	14.38	▼12.43
Total valid votes		230,695	98.77	
Rejected ballots		2,866	1.23	
KMT hold		Swing	▼6.22	
Turnout		233,561	77.98	▲16.81
Registered electors		299,527		

=== 2015 Recall Alex Tsai Election ===
2015 Recall Election: Taipei City Constituency IV
Choice	Votes	%
For	76,737	97.22
Against	2,196	2.78
Total	78,933	100.00
Valid votes	78,933	99.53
Invalid/blank votes	370	0.47
Total votes	79,303	100.00
Registered voters/turnout	317,434	24.98
Turnout needed		50.00

=== 2016 ===
Legislative Election 2016: Taipei City Constituency IV
Party	Candidate	Votes	%	±%
KMT	Lee Yen-hsiu (李彥秀)	89,612	41.74	▼6.53
People First	Huang Shan-shan (黃珊珊)	85,600	39.87	▲22.71
TSU	Xiao Yatan (蕭亞譚)	13,648	6.36	New
NPP	Lin Shaochi (林少馳)	12,246	5.70	
SDP	Chen Shang-chih (陳尚志)	10,278	4.79	New
Independent	He Wei (何伟)	2,497	1.16	New
Independence	Chen Zhaoming (陳兆銘)	568	0.26	New
Peace Pigeon Union Party	Li Yuefeng (李岳峰)	251	0.12	New
Majority		4,012	1.87	▼12.51
Total valid votes		214,700	98.06	
Rejected ballots		4,241	1.94	
KMT hold		Swing	▼14.62	
Turnout		218,941	68.21	▼9.77
Registered electors		320,963		

=== 2020 ===
Legislative Election 2020: Taipei City Constituency IV
Party	Candidate	Votes	%	±%
DPP	Kao Chia-yu (高嘉瑜)	125,138	50.12	New
KMT	Lee Yen-hsiu (李彥秀)	118,432	47.44	▲5.7
Green	Kuo Pei-wen (郭佩雯)	2,846	1.14	New
Stabilizing Force Party	Qian Yifan (錢一凡)	1,596	0.64	New
TAPA	Kuo Zheng-dian (郭正典)	1,062	0.43	New
Formosa Alliance	Xiao Cangze (蕭蒼澤)	338	0.14	New
Religious Alliance	Wen Xiangzhi (文祥志)	246	0.10	New
Majority		6,706	2.69	▲0.82
Total valid votes		249,658	98.93	
Rejected ballots		2,701	1.07	
DPP gain from KMT		Swing		
Turnout		252,359	77.71	▲9.50
Registered electors		324,765		

=== 2024 ===
Legislative Election 2024: Taipei City Constituency IV
Party	Candidate	Votes	%	±%
KMT	Lee Yen-hsiu (李彥秀)	112,743	47.64	▲0.20
DPP	Kao Chia-yu (高嘉瑜)	95,241	40.24	▼9.90
Statebuilding	Wu Hsin-tai (吳欣岱)	26,382	11.15	New
Taiwan Manipulative Therapist Union Labor Party	Lin Chiu-tung (林秋彤)	1,881	0.79	New
Institutional Island of Saving the World	Chen Shang-chih (黃啟彬)	422	0.18	New
Majority		17,502	7.39	▲4.70
Total valid votes		236,669	98.38	
Rejected ballots		3,894	1.62	
KMT gain from DPP		Swing		
Turnout		240,563	75.63	▼4.67
Registered electors		318,085		
