= Yanping High School =

Coordinates: 25°2′11.20″N 121°32′22.41″E

Taipei Yanping Senior High School
- 106 275 Ghian-guo South Road; Section 1, Taipei, Taiwan

Information
- Type: Private
- Established: 1946
- School district: Daan, Taipei, Taiwan
- Principal: Lin Zheng Gou
- Grades: 7th-9th in junior high school, and 10th-12th (1st-3rd) in senior high school
- Information: 886-2-2707-1478
- Website: www.yphs.tp.edu.tw

Taipei Yanping Senior High School (Chinese: 臺北市私立延平高級中學; pinyin: Táiběi Shì Sīlì Yánpíng Gāojí Zhōngxúe), also shortened to Yanping High School, is located in Daan District, Taipei City, Taiwan.

== History ==
=== Founding and the February 28 Incident ===
Soon after the end of World War II and the Japanese colonial period, Zhu Zhao-yang (朱昭陽), who was serving in Ōkura-shō, the present Ministry of Finance of Japan, and lawyer Song Chin-ying (宋進英) returned to Taiwan in the hope of improving the standard of education in their homeland.

The two planned to establish a "university" and — on the suggestion of the invited chair, Lin Hsien-tang — named the institution "Yan Ping", a dedication to the famous general of the Ming Dynasty, Koxinga.

The school opened as a college with only two departments — economics and law. The opening ceremony was held on the campus of Kainan Commercial High School on October 10, 1946, and was lit by only one small electric bulb. Zhu addressed the 1100 students under the moonlight, saying:

"In this chaotic and dismal time, we have to offer this society a slight ray of hope, and we have to be like the glittering light of the luminous firefly found only in a very harsh region of the world."

The school came to be known as the first college in Taiwan founded by the Taiwanese.

The February 28 Incident occurred immediately after the first semester, on February 27, during the winter vacation. The school was soon shut down by the government, which claimed it was hiding weapons.

=== The regeneration ===
Some years later, the original founders actively sought the revival of the school and their efforts finally convinced the government to allow the school to re-open in September 1948, under the name of Yan Ping Complementary Night High School, using the classrooms of Ximen Elementary School. Although its new status was lower than that of a college, most people regarded it as the revival of Yan Ping College and its original spirit. The school hired many well-known professors, including the former president of Taiwan, Lee Teng-hui (李登輝).

=== "The Palace Above the Water" ===
In 1953, the school moved to present location of Chien-gou S. Road and the construction of a new two story building was completed. The school was surround by water fields and gained the nickname "The Palace Above the Water". The school had a huge problem enrolling new students at the beginning. It could only make up one single class for the first 5 years, then expanded to 3 classes per year. The total number of students increased from three hundred to three thousand. Most of these came to the school after failing the entry exam for the more prestigious public schools.

From 1968, Taiwan started the 9-year compulsory education system, revitalising Yan Ping. The differences between public and private junior high school were eliminated, so more parents were willing to send their child to the school. The new students in the junior high school excelled in the high school entry examination.

=== The first private high ===
In 1979 the school established the "direct-promoted class", which allowed students to study there for a full 6 years without any additional entry exam. The percentage of seniors from the school entering universities rose substantially. Yan Ping became one of the top 15 high schools throughout Taiwan and reached first place among all the private high schools in the league tables.

Students now take the Basic Competence Test (國民中學基本學力測驗) prior to attending the school. There are still many students came to the Yan Ping because their result on the exam was not as good as expected. The campus has been re-built several times and consists of four buildings today.

== Publications ==
The Traditional Chinese publications Yanpinger (延平人) and Yanping Youth (延平青年) are written by students of "YanPing Youth Club"(延平青年社). There is also an English bimonthly called The Firefly edited mainly by the 11-grade students. The Firefly not only reports school events but also raises many global or local issues.

== Students' club ==
Students at Yan Ping have access to a limited number of after-class activities. The Foreign Language Centre provides several language classes. Languages taught are English, Japanese, and French.

== Notable alumni ==
=== Politicians ===
- Tina Pan
- Cheng Yun-peng
- Justin Chou

=== Directors ===
- Wu Nien-jen

=== Singers ===
- Freddy Lin (lead vocals of Chthonic)
- Devon Song (a member of Nan Quan Mama)

=== Business ===
- Henry Kao (CEO of I-MEI Foods Co., Ltd)
- Jamie Lin (Chairman & Partner of AppWorks)
