= Hsiao Yu-chen =

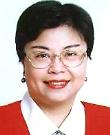
Hsiao Yu-chen

Hsiao Yu-chen (Chinese: 蕭裕珍; born 6 August 1956) is a Taiwanese politician.

Hsiao studied at the National Taiwan University College of Law and earned a Master of Arts in maritime business law at the University of London. She led the 1988 farmers' rights protest in Taiwan alongside Lin Kuo-hua.

Hsiao was a member of the Legislative Yuan from 1996 to 1999, representing Taipei 1 on behalf of the Democratic Progressive Party. She lost reelection under the New Nation Alliance banner in 1998. She ran for the Chiayi mayoralty in 2001 as an independent candidate, winning 1,601 votes (1.34%). Hsiao headed Frank Hsieh's 2006 campaign for the Taipei mayoralty.
