= Chang Chin-cheng =

Taiwanese politician and lawyer

Chang Chin-cheng (Chinese: 張晉城; born 1949) is a Taiwanese politician and lawyer.

== Education and career ==
Chang studied law at National Taiwan University and specialized in maritime commercial law during his master's degree at the University of London. He practiced law and led the Asia Pacific International Patents and Trademark Office. He chaired the Shilin District branch of the Taipei Rotary Club from 1994 to 1995.

Within the Democratic Progressive Party (DPP), Chang served as chairman of the Central Review Committee. He was elected to the National Assembly in 1991, as a representative of Taipei's second district, while affiliated with the DPP. He contested the 1995 Legislative Yuan elections as a DPP candidate, and was elected to the multi-member Taipei 1 district.

In 1996, DPP Chairman Shih Ming-teh united with the New Party to run for the President of the Legislative Yuan, but lost by one vote. The vote that was missing was Chang's failure to vote for Shih. As a result, Chang was expelled from the DPP. He served the rest of his term as an independent. During his stint as a member of the Legislative Yuan, Chang was physically attacked by colleague Lo Fu-chu.
