= 2018 Taipei mayoral election =

- November 24, 2018
- Turnout: 65.95% (▼4.51 pp)
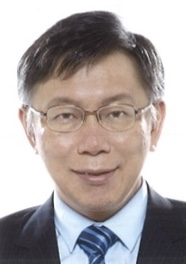

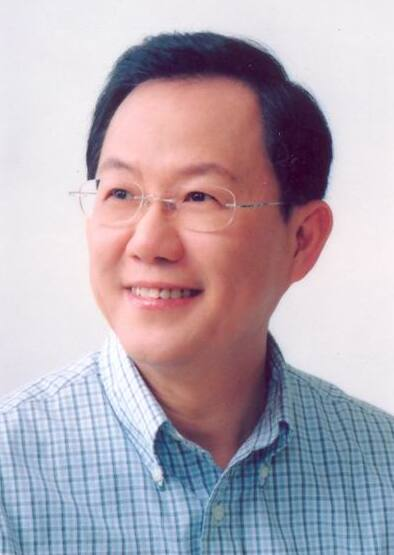

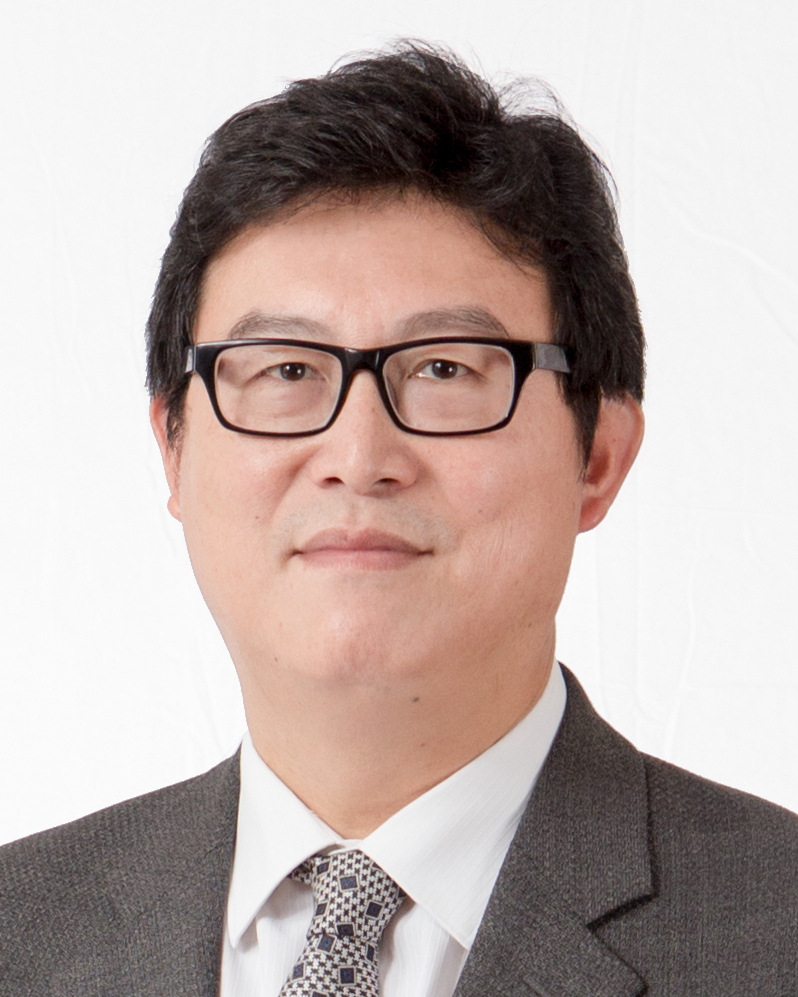
Candidate	Ko Wen-je	Ting Shou-chung	Pasuya Yao
Party	Independent	KMT	DPP
Popular vote	580,663	577,096	244,342
Percentage	41.1%	40.8%	17.3%
- Grey indicates districts won by Ko. Blue indicates those won by Ting.
Mayor before election
Ko Wen-je
Independent
Elected Mayor
Ko Wen-je
Independent

The 2018 Taipei mayoral election was held on 24 November alongside other local elections. Incumbent mayor Ko Wen-je, an independent, was eligible to run for a second term, and he ran against Kuomintang's Ting Shou-chung and the Democratic Progressive Party's Pasuya Yao. Ko was reelected, defeating Ting by only 3567 votes, and was sworn in on 25 December.

== Background ==
The Mayor of Taipei is the head of its city government. Since becoming a special municipality in 1994, the mayor has been directly elected by citizens, serves a four-year term, and can be reelected once. As of 2018, four mayors have been elected, serving seven terms total.

== Primaries ==
Registration for candidacies were open from 27 to 31 August. Each candidate had to be 30 years of age, lived in Taipei for at least four months, and paid two million New Taiwan dollars as deposit. The finalized list of candidates was released on 9 November and had five names.

=== Ko Wen-je ===
Ko announced his intentions to run for a second term in an interview with NewTalk news on 22 December 2016. He officially registered his candidacy on 30 August.

=== Kuomintang ===
Four Kuomintang members announced intentions to run: former representative Ting Shou-chung, former deputy minister of the Mainland Affairs Council Chang Hsiao-ping, former representative Sun Ta-chien, and Taipei councilor Chang Hsien-yao. Ting won the primaries with a polling average of 47.634%.

Ting's family was from Zhejiang and is a second-generation Waishengren. He has served seven terms as representative since 1990. He ran on restoring elderly pensions cancelled by Ko and expanding the Taipei Metro by completing the Circular line. On gay rights issues, he supported the 2018 referendum and opposes same-sex marriage.

2018 Kuomintang Taipei Mayoral primaries
Candidate	TVBS	Apollo Survey	United Daily News	Polling average
Ting Shou-chung	48.395%	46.778%	47.741%	47.634%
Sun Ta-chien	17.891%	18.845%	17.878%	18.205%
Chang Hsien-yao	17.073%	17.909%	16.723%	17.235%
Chang Hsiao-ping	16.651%	16.468%	17.658%	16.926%

=== Democratic Progressive Party ===
In the last election, the Democratic Progressive Party had endorsed Ko alongside other pan-green parties. After taking office, Ko criticized several DPP policies, leading to them running their own candidate instead.

Two DPP members announced intentions to run: representative for Taipei's second constituency Pasuya Yao, and former vice president Annette Lu. Su Huan-chih, former Mayor of Tainan, having become dissatisfied with Tsai Ing-wen's policies, left the party and ran as an independent, but later dropped out and ran for reelection instead. On 30 May, the party decided to nominate Yao as their candidate for mayor.

== Results ==
Ballots took 10 hours and 35 minutes to count, with the process being completed and results announced at 2:36 AM of the next day. Ko received 580,820, a plurality, and was reelected. Ting challenged the results and demanded the Taipei district court for a recount, which happened from 3 to 10 December. Vote totals were amended, with Ko going down 157 votes to 580,663, and Ting going down 470 to 577,096. With a margin of only 3567 votes (0.3%), the election was one of the closest in Taiwanese history.

Candidate	Party	Votes	%
Ko Wen-je	Independent	580,663	41.07
Ting Shou-chung	Kuomintang	577,096	40.82
Pasuya Yao	Democratic Progressive	244,342	17.28
Lee Hsi-kun	Independent	6,158	0.44
Wu E-yang	Independent	5,611	0.40
Total		1,413,870	100.00
Valid votes		1,413,870	99.06
Invalid/blank votes		13,355	0.94
Total votes		1,427,225	100.00
Registered voters/turnout		2,164,155	65.95

=== Results by district ===
District	Ko Wen-je		Ting Shou-chung		Pasuya Yao		Lee Hsi-kun		Wu E-yang		Total votes
District	Votes	%	Votes	%	Votes	%	Votes	%	Votes	%	Total votes
Songshan	42,315	39.62	46,353	43.40	17,285	16.18	417	0.39	425	0.39	106,795
Xinyi	47,620	38.94	53,812	44.00	19,849	16.23	509	0.41	500	0.40	122,290
Daan	60,940	38.53	72,311	45.72	23,646	14.95	658	0.41	582	0.36	158,137
Zhongshan	50,582	41.54	46,732	38.38	23,476	19.28	490	0.40	476	0.39	121,756
Zhongzheng	33,748	41.65	33,896	41.83	12,631	15.58	377	0.46	372	0.45	81,024
Datong	31,660	45.29	20,745	29.67	16,895	24.16	339	0.48	266	0.38	69,905
Wanhua	43,379	41.63	38,520	36.97	21,397	20.53	465	0.44	426	0.40	104,187
Wenshan	56,463	38.82	68,549	47.13	18,989	13.05	710	0.48	710	0.48	145,421
Nangang	29,071	43.53	26,271	39.33	10,829	16.21	324	0.48	287	0.42	66,782
Neihu	65,589	43.70	61,546	41.01	21,747	14.49	639	0.42	549	0.36	150,070
Shilin	63,216	41.20	55,938	36.45	33,108	21.57	653	0.42	521	0.33	153,436
Beitou	56,080	41.82	52,423	39.10	24,490	18.26	577	0.43	497	0.37	134,067
Totals	580,663	41.06	577,096	40.81	244,342	17.28	6158	0.43	5611	0.39	1,413,870
