= Hung Chun-che =

Taiwanese basketball player, coach, and politician

Hung Chun-che (Chinese: 洪濬哲; born 9 February 1951) is a Taiwanese basketball player, coach, and politician.

As a child, Hung was frequently in poor health and required frequent trips to the hospital. To improve his health, Hung committed to exercising and began playing basketball at age eleven. Because he was shorter than other players, Hung's play on junior high teams did not garner much attention. His hours of extra practice, both early in the morning and late into the night, made a difference by the age of seventeen, when he claimed a roster spot on the national team. Hung retired as a player in 1982 at the age of 30, and won his first election to the Taipei City Council as a Kuomintang candidate in 1985. He won a second term in 1989, vacating the office to sit in the Legislative Yuan from 1993 to 1996, where he represented the multi-member Taipei 1st district between 1993 and 1996. Hung later coached the Bank of Taiwan basketball team, succeeding Hung Chun-cheng in the role.
