= Lee Yen-hsiu =

Taiwanese politician (born 1971)

- 李彥秀
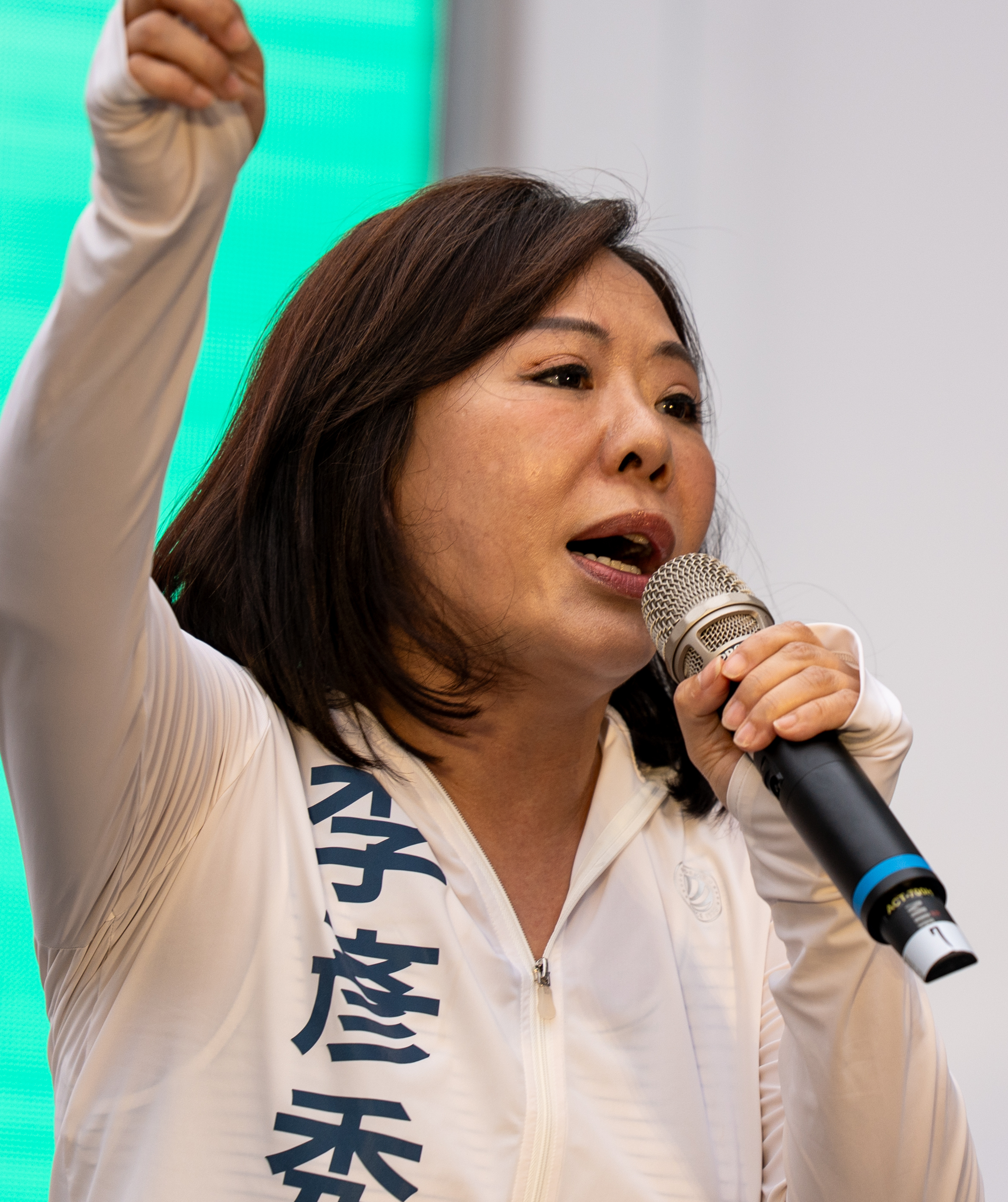
- Lee in 2025

Member of the Legislative Yuan
- Incumbent
- Assumed office February 1, 2024
- Preceded by: Kao Chia-yu
- Constituency: Taipei IV
- In office February 1, 2016 – January 31, 2020
- Preceded by: Alex Tsai
- Succeeded by: Kao Chia-yu
- Constituency: Taipei IV

Personal details
- Born: 18 December 1971 (age 54) Taipei, Taiwan
- Party: Kuomintang
- Education: University of California, Irvine (BA); Pepperdine University (MBA)

Lee Yen-hsiu (Chinese: 李彥秀; born 18 December 1971) is a Taiwanese politician. A member of the Kuomintang (KMT), she was elected to represent Taipei City Constituency IV in the Legislative Yuan in 2016 and 2024.

== Early life and education ==
Lee was born on 18 December 1971 in Taipei, Taiwan. Both her father and paternal grandfather became members of the Taipei City Council.

Lee finished high school at Blessed Imelda's School. She then studied in the United States, graduating from the University of California, Irvine, with a bachelor's degree in economics. She later earned a Master of Business Administration (M.B.A.) degree from Pepperdine University.
