= Taoyuan City Constituency 1 =

Constituency of the Legislative Yuan of Taiwan

- Single-member constituency for the Legislative Yuan
- District(s): Luzhu, Guishan, & parts of Taoyuan

Current constituency
- Created: 2008
- Member(s): Chen Ken-te (2008–2016); Cheng Yun-peng (2016–2024); Niu Hsu-Ting

Taoyuan City Constituency 1 (Chinese: 桃園市第一選舉區; pinyin: Táoyuán Shì Dì-yī Xuǎnjǔ Qū) includes Luzhu, Guishan, and part of Taoyuan District in Taoyuan City. The district was formerly known as Taoyuan County Constituency 1 (2008-2014) and was created in 2008, when all local constituencies of the Legislative Yuan were reorganized to become single-member districts.

== Current district ==
- Luzhu
- Guishan
- Taoyuan

== Legislators ==
Representative	Party	Dates	Notes
Chen Ken-te	Kuomintang	2008–2016	
Cheng Yun-peng	Democratic Progressive Party	2016–2024	
Niu Hsu-Ting	Kuomintang	2024–	Incumbent

== Election results ==
=== 2016 ===
Legislative Election 2016: Taoyuan City Constituency 1
Party	Candidate	Votes	%	±%
Democratic Progressive	Cheng Yun-peng	85,955	47.25	+2.60
Kuomintang	Chen Ken-te	80,142	44.06	–11.29
Others	Wang Baoxuan	15,802	8.69	+8.69
Majority		5,813	3.19	
Total valid votes		181,899	98.68	
Rejected ballots		2,439	1.32	
Democratic Progressive gain from Kuomintang		Swing	+6.94	
Turnout		184,338	66.44	–8.14
Registered electors		277,449		

=== 2024 ===
Legislative Election 2024: Taoyuan City Constituency 1
Party	Candidate	Votes	%	±%
Kuomintang	Niu Hsu-Ting	116,571	48.44	
Democratic Progressive	Cheng Yun-peng	103,466	43.00	
Independent	Ma Chih Wei	20,600	8.56	
Majority		13,105	5.45	
Total valid votes		240,637		
Kuomintang gain from Democratic Progressive		Swing		
