= Rosalia Wu =

Taiwanese politician

Wu Szu-yao MLY
- 吳思瑤
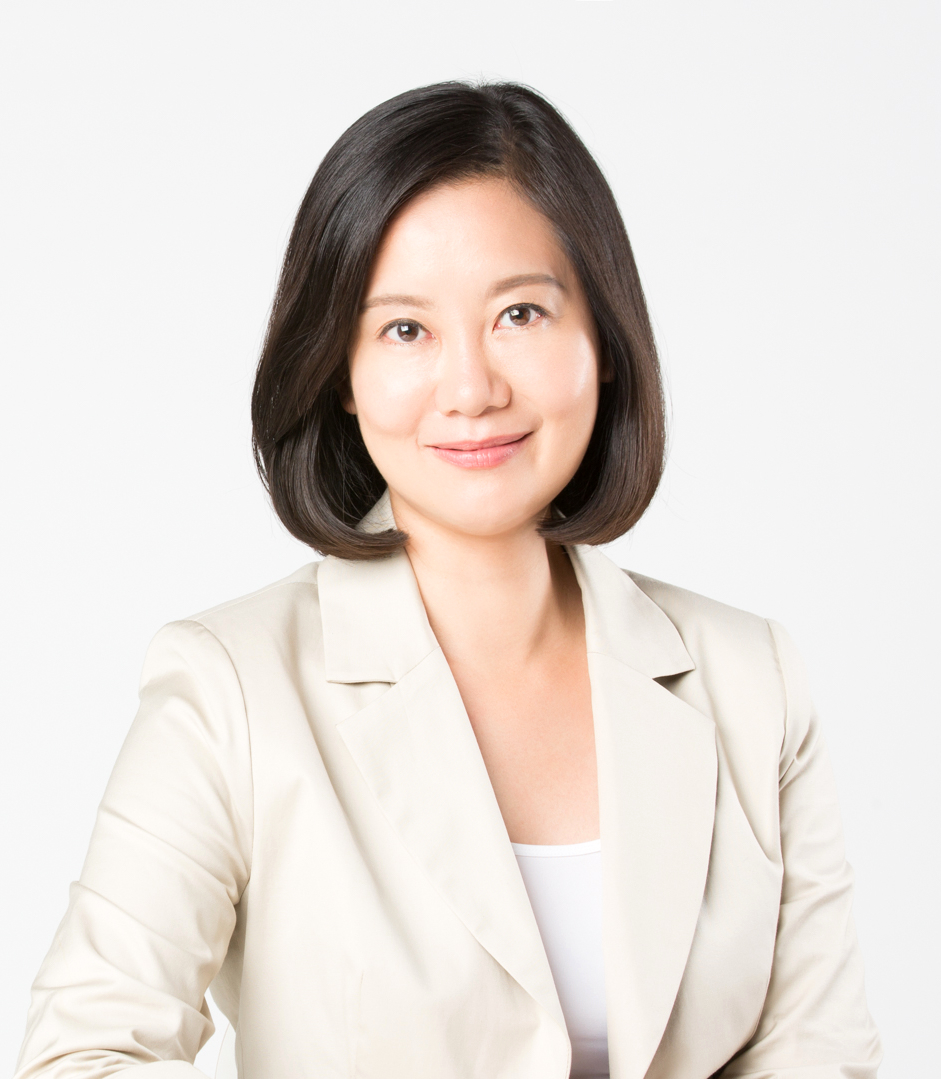
- Official portrait, 2019

Member of the Legislative Yuan
- Incumbent
- Assumed office 1 February 2016
- Preceded by: Ting Shou-chung
- Constituency: Taipei 1

Taipei City Councillor
- In office 25 December 2006 – 31 January 2016
- Constituency: Taipei 1st precinct

Personal details
- Born: 28 May 1974 (age 52) Taipei County, Taiwan
- Party: Democratic Progressive Party
- Education: Fu Jen Catholic University (BA); National Taiwan University (MA)

Wu Szu-yao (Chinese: 吳思瑤; pinyin: Wú Sīyáo; born 28 May 1974), also known by her English name Rosalia Wu, is a Taiwanese politician. Elected to the Taipei City Council in 2006, she served until 2016, when she won election to the Legislative Yuan.

== Early life and education ==
Wu was born in New Taipei City, Taiwan, on May 28, 1974. After high school, she graduated from Fu Jen Catholic University with a bachelor's degree in foreign languages with a specialization in Spanish and Japanese. She then earned a Master of Arts (M.A.) in political science from National Taiwan University in 2012. Her master's thesis was titled, "A political and economic analysis of Taipei's animal protection policies".

== Political career ==
Wu is affiliated with the former New Tide faction of the Democratic Progressive Party. She was elected to the DPP's Central Standing Committee in 2012.

Wu was elected to the Taipei City Council three times, in 2006, 2010, and 2014. For a portion of her time on the city council, Wu served as the DPP's caucus whip. While on the council, she showed an interest in environmental and infrastructure issues. In 2009, after a televised advertisement had been taken off the air due to a violation of the Satellite Radio and Television Act, Wu worked to remove a printed equivalent from the sides of Taipei buses. She sought to reopen the Zhongshan Soccer Stadium for its intended use after the 2010 Taipei International Flora Exposition, but did not succeed.

During the 2016 legislative elections, Wu defeated Chen Hsi-yu in an interparty primary. She was named the sole Pan-Green Coalition candidate for Taipei 1st district, and won election to the legislature by joining an electoral coalition of seven others, including Freddy Lim and Pasuya Yao. Wu defeated the district's incumbent representative, Ting Shou-chung, winning 95,000 votes. As a legislator, she has focused her attention on academia and education in Taiwan. Wu is opposed to corporal punishment in schools, and to education minister Wu Se-hwa's proposed senior high school curriculum changes, which were implemented despite a student protest. She spoke out against a 2016 proposal to merge Tainan National University of the Arts and National Cheng Kung University, stating, "I am against amalgamation for the sake of amalgamation." In March 2017, Wu said that Fu Jen Catholic University College of Social Sciences dean Hsia Lin-ching did not do enough to investigate allegations of sexual assault, and berated university administration for giving Hsia a light penalty. Shortly after her comments, Fu Jen students went to the Legislative Yuan to meet Wu, who was not there.
