= Cheng Yun-peng =

Taiwanese politician (born 1973)

Cheng Yun-peng MLY
- 鄭運鵬
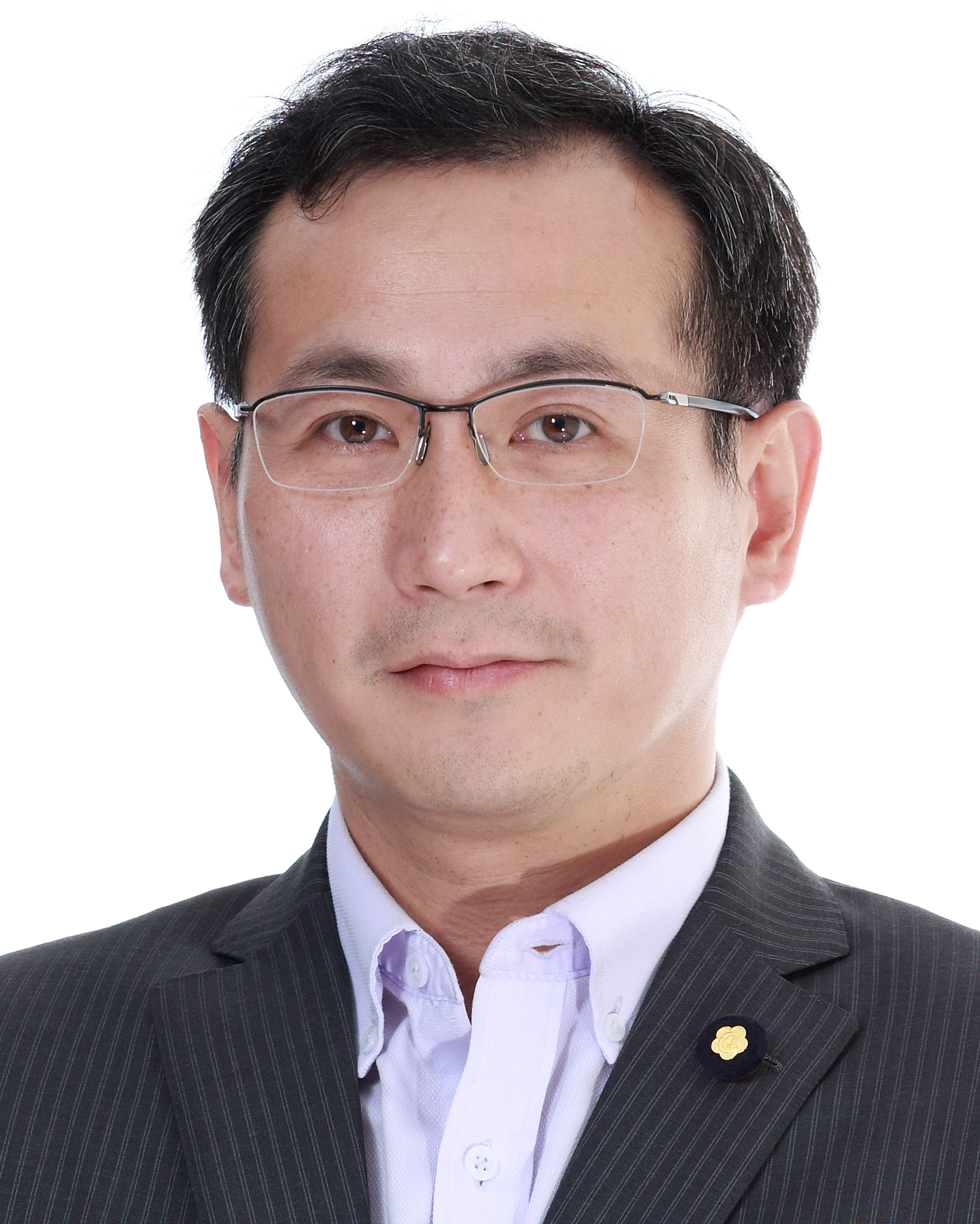
- Official portrait, 2016

Member of the Legislative Yuan
- In office 1 February 2016 – 31 January 2024
- Preceded by: Chen Ken-te
- Succeeded by: Niu Hsu-ting
- Constituency: Taoyuan I
- Majority: 85,955 (47.25%)
- In office 1 February 2005 – 31 January 2008
- Succeeded by: Ting Shou-chung
- Constituency: Taipei 1

Personal details
- Born: 2 June 1973 (age 52) Taipei, Taiwan
- Party: Democratic Progressive Party
- Education: National Taiwan University (BS)

Cheng Yun-peng (Chinese: 鄭運鵬; pinyin: Zhèng Yùnpéng; born 2 June 1973) is a Taiwanese politician. He was a member of the Legislative Yuan from 2005 to 2008, and elected to the office between 2016 and 2024.

== Early life, education, and early career ==
Born in Taipei on Dihua Street, Cheng's father graduated from National Cheng Kung University and was a supporter of Tangwai movement. Yun-peng is the second son of the family; he has a brother, Yun-hung.

Cheng graduated from National Taiwan University with a degree in civil engineering. When he was a junior, he campaigned with Chen Shui-bian in the Taipei mayoral election. After his mandatory national service, he served as an assistant for Shen Fu-hsiung, Member of the Legislative Yuan. After Frank Hsieh was elected Kaohsiung mayor, Cheng worked in Kaohsiung department of Labor. He briefly served as the Director of Promotion Department in the Democratic Progressive Party.

== Political career ==
Cheng was elected as a Member of Legislative Yuan for Taipei 1st district in 2004. Cheng lost his primary to Kao Chien-chih in the 2008 election after his advertisement scandal. Cheng retired from politics and created a media company. Cheng returned to the Democratic Progressive Party in 2012.

Cheng ran for a Legislative Yuan seat in Taoyuan 1st district in the 2016 election. He won a majority vote of 5,813, defeating five-term veteran Chen Ken-te.

In August 2022, Cheng was named the Democratic Progressive Party candidate for the Taoyuan mayoralty, as Lin Chih-chien's campaign ended due to a plagiarism scandal.

== Controversy ==
In 2005, Cheng was photographed attending a movie with Tainan City Councilor Chen Hsieh-ling. As Cheng was in a serious relationship at the time, he declared that he did not cheat on his girlfriend.

Cheng was sentenced to six months in jail and three years of deprivation of political rights for a campaign advertising libel suit.

== Electoral record ==
Incumbents are in bold.

Taiwanese general election, 2016: Taoyuan 1st district
List	Candidate	Party	Votes	%	Elected
1	Cheng Yun-peng	Democratic Progressive Party	85,955	47.25%	
2	**Chen Ken-te**	Kuomintang	80,142	44.06%	
3	Wang Pao-hsuan	Green-Social Democratic Union	15,802	8.69%	
**Voters**			277,449		
**Votes**			184,338		
**Valid votes**			181,899		
**Rejected votes**			2,439		
**Turnout**			66.44%		
