= Kao Chia-yu =

Taiwanese politician (born 1980)

Kao Chia-yu MLY
- 高嘉瑜
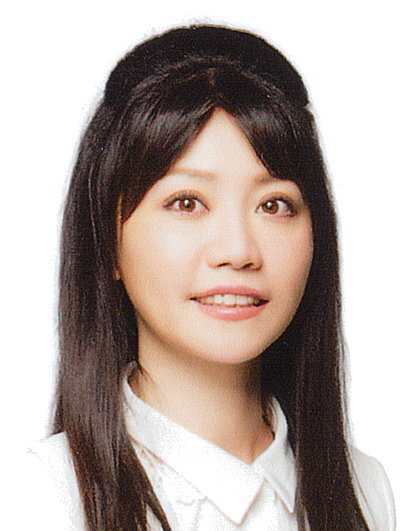
- Official portrait, 2020

Member of the Legislative Yuan
- In office 1 February 2020 – 31 January 2024
- Preceded by: Lee Yen-hsiu
- Succeeded by: Lee Yen-hsiu
- Constituency: Taipei IV

Taipei City Councillor
- In office 25 December 2010 – 31 January 2020
- Constituency: Taipei City District 2 (Neihu, Nangang)

Member of the National Assembly
- In office 30 May 2005 – 7 June 2005

Personal details
- Born: 17 October 1980 (age 46) Qidu District, Keelung, Taiwan
- Party: Democratic Progressive Party
- Education: National Taiwan University (LLB, MA)

Kao Chia-yu (Chinese: 高嘉瑜; pinyin: Gāo Jiāyú; born 17 October 1980) is a Taiwanese politician and a member of the Democratic Progressive Party (DPP). She was elected to the National Assembly in 2005. Upon assuming office, she became the youngest person to ever be seated in that legislative body. Between 2010 and 2020, Kao was a Taipei City Councillor. She was elected to the Legislative Yuan in 2020.

== Early life and education ==
Kao was born in Keelung, Taiwan, on 17 October 1980. She has a younger sister and brother. Her father is the owner of a department store in Keelung.

After graduating from the prestigious Taipei First Girls' High School, Kao studied law at National Taiwan University (NTU) and earned a Bachelor of Laws (LL.B.) and a master's degree in national development and political science. As a student at NTU, she became the 14th president of the NTU Student Association.

== Political career ==
Kao became an assistant of Legislative Yuan member Luo Wen-jia. She later won the 2005 National Assembly election and became the youngest member of the National Assembly in Republic of China history.

In the 2010 local elections, Kao was elected councillor of Taipei City, and was re-elected twice in 2014 and 2018.

She was initially nominated by the DPP to run for the 2008 legislative election, representing Taipei City District 6, but was replaced by Luo Wen-jia, after President Chen Shui-bian returned to lead the Democratic Progressive Party as chairman. In 2015, she protested DPP's decision not to nominate any candidate for the Neihu and Nangang district for the 2016 election. Kao defeated Lee Yen-hsiu in the 2020 legislative election, but lost to Lee in 2024.

She would occasionally sing in the public, but some netizens found her singing voice being terrible. During the 2024 Taiwan general elections, she was even requested by William Lai (The presidential candidate of DPP) not to sing during the election campaign.

== Personal life ==
Kao dated her boyfriend, Ma Wen-yu, for more than a decade. Ma was her assistant and was her junior when they were both studying in NTU. In November 2021, Kao reported that her partner, Raphael Lin, physically assaulted her during an argument. Lin was formally arrested in December 2021, and indicted on eight criminal charges in January 2022. Charges against Lin included violations of privacy and personal freedom, bodily harm, coercion, intimidation, and slander targeting Kao, dissemination of malicious texts while using her computer, as well as the falsification of his own financial documents. In September 2022, the New Taipei District Court sentenced Lin to two years and ten months in prison.

== See also ==
- Lin Ying-meng
