= Fan Yun (politician) =

Taiwanese sociologist and politician (born 1968)

- 范雲
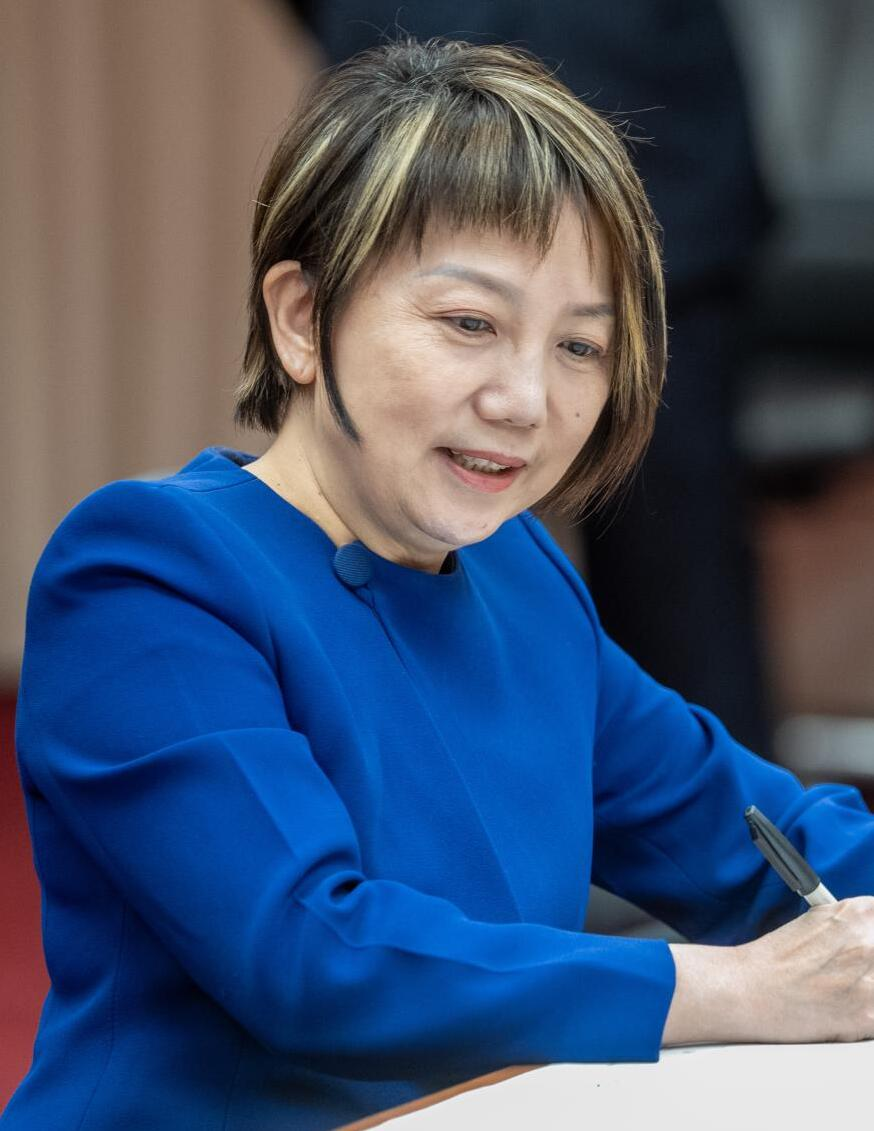
- Fan in 2024

Member of the Legislative Yuan
- Incumbent
- Assumed office February 1, 2020
- Constituency: National at-large

Personal details
- Born: July 9, 1968 (age 58) Tamsui, Taiwan
- Education: National Taiwan University (BS, MS); Yale University (PhD)

Fan Yun (Chinese: 范雲; pinyin: Fàn Yún; born July 9, 1968) is a Taiwanese sociologist and politician who has been a member of the Legislative Yuan since 2020.

== Early life and education ==
Fan was born in Tamsui District, Taipei County (now New Taipei City), on July 9, 1968. She has three sisters. Her father was a Kuomintang soldier who moved to Taiwan from Jiangsu in 1949 during the Great Retreat, and her mother was a Taiwanese native of Yunlin. Fan's parents were the owners of a noodle shop and general store in Tamsui.

After graduating from Taipei First Girls' High School, she attended National Taiwan University (NTU) and earned a Bachelor of Science (B.S.) and a Master of Science (M.S.), both in sociology. As a student there, she was the president of the NTU Mainland Society (臺灣大學大陸問題研究社), an anti-communist student activist group, and ran to be president of the university's student union. She also participated in the Wild Lily student movement.

In 2000, Fan earned her Ph.D. in sociology from Yale University. Her doctoral dissertation, completed under political scientist Frances McCall Rosenbluth, was titled, "Activists in a changing political environment: A microfoundational study of social movements in Taiwan's democratic transition, 1980s–1990s". The thesis won Yale's 2001 Marvin B. Sussman Dissertation Prize for the most outstanding dissertation of the last two years.

== Political career ==
=== Social Democratic Party (2015–2019) ===
In 2015, Fan helped establish the Social Democratic Party (SDP), a center-left party advocating social justice, economic equality, and political reform. She contested Taipei City Constituency 6 in the 2016 Taiwanese legislative election as a candidate of the Green Party–Social Democratic Party Alliance, losing to incumbent Kuomintang legislator Chiang Nai-shin. Following the SDP's failure to secure legislative representation, Fan resigned as party convener in January 2016.

In 2018, Fan attempted to run for mayor of Taipei, but the election commission rejected her registration after she refused to pay the required NT$2 million deposit, which she argued discriminated against candidates with limited financial resources. In November 2019, she accepted an invitation to join the Democratic Progressive Party (DPP)'s national party list for the 2020 legislative election, citing increasing pressure from China on Taiwan and the political situation in Hong Kong as reasons for her decision.

=== Legislative Yuan (2020–present) ===
Fan was elected to the Legislative Yuan in 2020 as an at-large DPP legislator. During her first term, she served on the Education and Culture Committee, which she subsequently chaired. She advocated reforms concerning gender equality, labor protections, and electoral participation, including legislation to abolish election deposit requirements. During Taiwan's MeToo movement in 2023, Fan supported amendments to three major gender-equality laws aimed at strengthening protections against sexual harassment and improving complaint procedures for victims.

Fan was re-elected through the DPP's party list in 2024. In July 2024, she became one of Taiwan's two co-chairs of the Inter-Parliamentary Alliance on China, an international parliamentary organization addressing challenges posed by the Chinese government. By 2026, she was serving as secretary-general of the DPP legislative caucus.
