= Lin Ying-meng =

Taiwanese politician

- 林穎孟
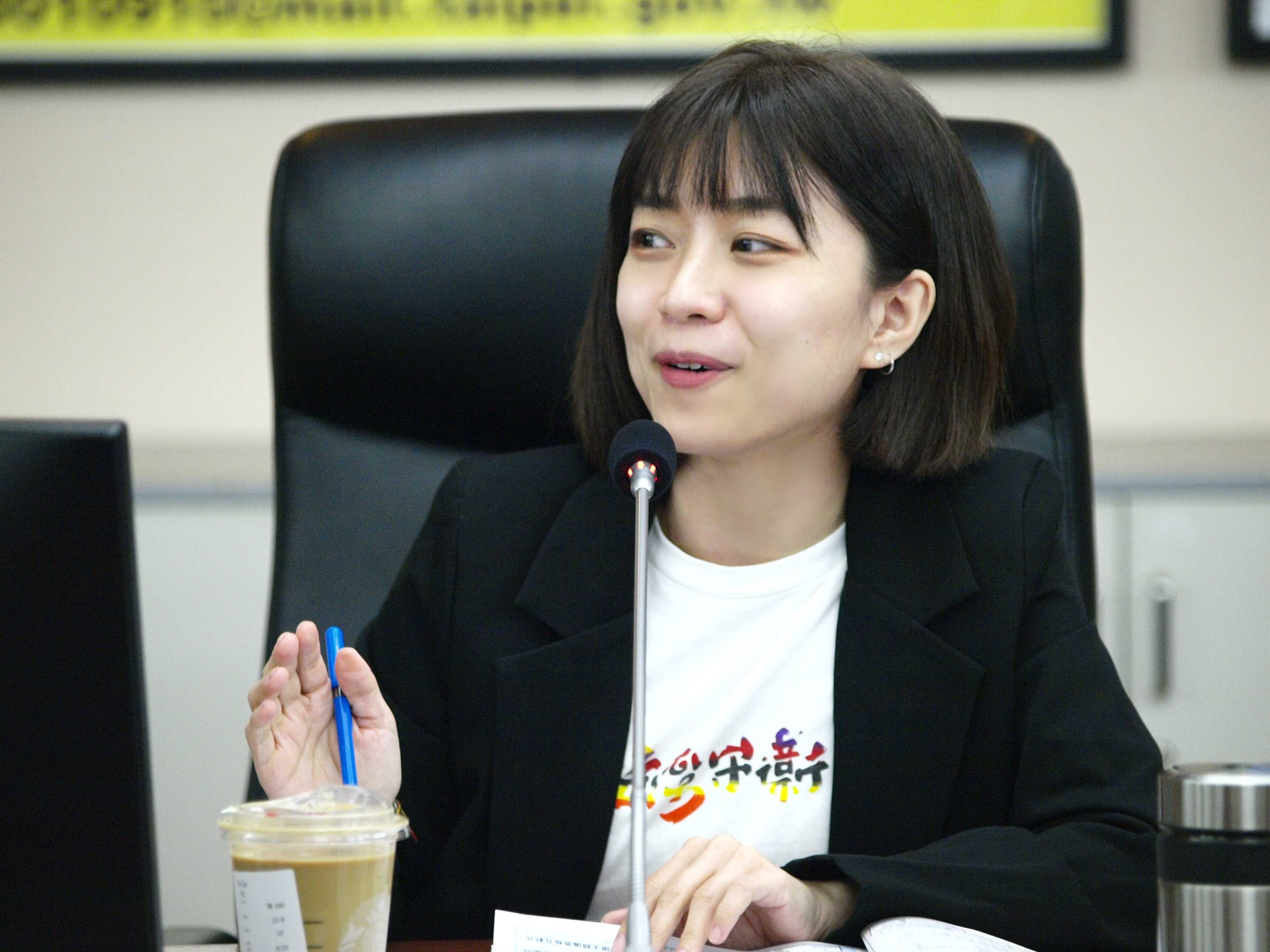

Taipei City Councilor
- Incumbent
- Assumed office 25 December 2018
- Constituency: Taipei City District 6 (serving Daan-Wenshan)

Personal details
- Born: 20 October 1983 (age 42) Taichung, Taiwan
- Party: Independent; New Power Party (2017–2020)
- Education: National Tsing Hua University (BA); National Taiwan University (MA, LLB)

Chinese name
- Traditional Chinese: 林穎孟
- Simplified Chinese: 林颖孟
Transcriptions
Standard Mandarin
- Hanyu Pinyin: Lín Yǐngmèng
Southern Min
- Hokkien POJ: Lîm Éng-bēng

Lin Ying-meng (Chinese: 林穎孟; pinyin: Lín Yǐngmèng; Pe̍h-ōe-jī: Lîm Éng-bēng; born 20 October 1983) is a Taiwanese politician. She has served since 2018 as a councillor of the Taipei City Council, where she represents Taipei City District 6. She is one of the first openly LGBT people in Taiwanese history to have been voted into local legislatures.

== Early life and education ==
Lin Ying-meng was born in Taichung on 20 October 1983. She received her education in Stella Matutina Girls' High School, a Catholic missionary school in the city.

After high school, Lin graduated from National Tsing Hua University with a B.A. degree in the humanities and sociology. She then earned a master's degree in sociology in 2015 and an LL.B. in 2017, both from National Taiwan University.

When Lin was a child, she was fond of anime, and used to aspire to be a cartoonist. She did field research work in a maid café for two years, in order to understand the social phenomenon. The experience helped her write her graduation thesis in NTU's research institute. Lin assisted in developing mobile apps in a game company after her studies.

== Social activism and political career ==
Lin was initially a volunteer in social movement organisations. She started to know fellow activists Wu Cheng (吳崢) and Freddy Lim during the 2014 Sunflower Student Movement. When the NPP won seats in the Legislative Yuan, the national parliament, Lin was motivated to take part in parliamentary work.

On 24 March 2017, Lin was appointed spokeswoman of NPP headquarters.

As a social and political activist, Lin is concerned about topics such as gender, culture, politics, human rights, political status of Taiwan, transitional justice, generational justice (世代正義) as well as marriage equality. She previously also served as leader of the bills (proposed legislation) team in Legislator Freddy Lim's Office.

She took office as councillor of Taipei City in 2018, on Constitution Day, which coincides with Christmas Day. Her term will end in 2022. As a member of the legislature in the capital of Taiwan, the Taipei City Government and Mayor is responsible to her and her colleagues. When questioned by Lin in 2019, the administration in Taipei confirmed that all same-sex couples who intended to marry on 24 May, the date when same-sex marriage was implemented nationwide, within the capital would be able to do so. All Household Registration Offices would work overtime to accommodate these couples.

Lin left the New Power Party in August 2020. In August 2022, Lin and her former partner were charged with violating the Anti-Corruption Act and the Criminal Code. Lin hired her then-boyfriend, Yeh Yao-chang, as a political aide at the start of her term as councillor. She also paid a student for part-time work. After the student left her office, Lin continued applying for the subsidy that would have paid the student. Separately, Yeh left Lin's office to establish a public relations company, and Lin was accused of forging documents on Yeh's behalf, placing an employee of his on her payroll so that the employee would be paid with public funds.

== Personal life ==
Lin has come out openly as a bisexual woman. On 20 January 2018, she announced during the NPP's anniversary that she would run for the seat of councillor representing Daan-Wenshan, becoming one of the first openly LGBT officials in Taiwan.

== Notable works ==
- Lin, Ying-meng (2011). 我在「女僕喫茶」工作：跨／次文化中的女性身體與表演勞動 [Working in the 'Meido Kissa': the Female Body and Performative Labor in Cross/Subculture].
- Li, Ming-tsung; Lin, Ying-meng (December 2013). 從情緒勞動到表演勞動：臺北「女僕喫茶（咖啡館）」之民族誌初探 [From Emotional Labor to Performing Labor: An Ethnographic Study of Taipei's "Maid Café"]. Vol. 53. Taiwanese Journal of Sociology.
- Lin, Ying-meng; et al. (2015-08-08). 動漫社會學：別說得好像還有救 [Anime sociology: Don't speak of it as if there's still hope]. Kiwi Fruit Studio. ISBN 9789869194327.

== See also ==
- Kao Chia-yu
