= Taipei City Constituency 1 =

Constituency of the Legislative Yuan of Taiwan

Taipei City Constituency I
- Single-member constituency for the Legislative Yuan
- Boundary of Taipei City 1st Constituency
- District(s): Beitou and parts of Shilin
- Electorate: 275,438

Current constituency
- Created: 2008
- Member of the Legislative Yuan: Rosalia Wu (Democratic Progressive Party) (2016–)

Taipei City Constituency I (Chinese: 臺北市第一選舉區; pinyin: Táiběi Shì Dì-yī Xuǎnjǔ Qū) includes all of Beitou and part of Shilin in northern Taipei. The constituency is currently represented by Rosalia Wu of the Democratic Progressive Party.

The constituency was originally one of two multi-member constituencies in Taipei from 1989 to 2008, and acquired its present boundaries in 2008, when all constituencies of the Legislative Yuan were reorganized to become single-member constituencies.

== Current boundaries ==
- Beitou
- Shilin: 2 sub-districts
  - Tianmu: 8 urban villages
    - Sanyu, Tianmu, Tianfu, Tianlu, Tianshou, Tianhe, Tianshan, Tianyu
  - Lanya: 5 urban villages
    - Dexing, Dehua, Zhongcheng, Lanya, Lanxing

== Historical boundaries ==
1989-2008

Songshan District, Xinyi District, Neihu District, Nangang District, Shilin District, Beitou District

== Legislators ==
=== Legislators 1989–2008 (Plural Constituency Period) ===
Kuomintang Democratic Progressive Party New Party People First Party Independent

Taipei City Constituency I
Election	Legislator	Legislator	Legislator	Legislator	Legislator	Legislator	Legislator	Legislator	Legislator	Legislator
1989 1st	Ting Shou-chung (丁守中) (Kuomintang)	Chao Chen-peng (趙振鵬) (Kuomintang)	Chou Chuan (周荃) (Kuomintang →New Party)	Jaw Shaw-kong (趙少康) (Kuomintang)	Chen Shui-bian (陳水扁) (Democratic Progressive Party)	Frank Hsieh Chang-ting (謝長廷) (Democratic Progressive Party)	6 seats (1989)			
1992 2nd	Ting Shou-chung (丁守中) (Kuomintang)	Chao Chen-peng (趙振鵬) (Kuomintang)	Chou Chuan (周荃) (Kuomintang →New Party)	Hung Chun-che (洪濬哲) (Kuomintang)	Chen Shui-bian (陳水扁) (Democratic Progressive Party)	Frank Hsieh Chang-ting (謝長廷) (Democratic Progressive Party)	John Kuan (關中) (Kuomintang)	Lin Cho-shui (林濁水) (Democratic Progressive Party)	Wang Chien-shien (王建煊) (Kuomintang →New Party)	9 seats (1992-1998)
1995 3rd	Ting Shou-chung (丁守中) (Kuomintang)	Hsieh Chin-tsung (謝欽宗) (Kuomintang)	Chen Han-chiang (陳漢強) (New Party)	Hau Lung-pin (郝龍斌) (New Party)	Kao Hui-yu (高惠宇) (New Party)	Hsiao Yu-chen (蕭裕珍) (Democratic Progressive Party)	Wang Hsueh-fung (王雪峰) (Democratic Progressive Party)	Lin Cho-shui (林濁水) (Democratic Progressive Party)	Chang Chin-cheng (張晉城) (Democratic Progressive Party →Independent)	9 seats (1992-1998)
1998 4th	Ting Shou-chung (丁守中) (Kuomintang)	Chin Hui-chu (秦慧珠) (Kuomintang →People First Party)	Mu Min-chu (穆閩珠) (Kuomintang)	Hau Lung-pin (郝龍斌) (New Party)	Cho Jung-tai (卓榮泰) (Democratic Progressive Party)	Lin Chung-mo (林重謨) (Democratic Progressive Party)	Wang Hsueh-fung (王雪峰) (Democratic Progressive Party)	Lin Cho-shui (林濁水) (Democratic Progressive Party)	Shih Ming-teh (施明德) (Democratic Progressive Party)	Lin Ruey-tou (林瑞圖) (Independent)
2001 5th	Hsu Yuan-kuo (許淵國) (People First Party)	Chin Hui-chu (秦慧珠) (Kuomintang →People First Party)	Mu Min-chu (穆閩珠) (Kuomintang)	Alex Tsai (蔡正元) (Kuomintang)	Cho Jung-tai (卓榮泰) (Democratic Progressive Party)	Lin Chung-mo (林重謨) (Democratic Progressive Party)	Wang Hsueh-fung (王雪峰) (Democratic Progressive Party)	Luo Wen-jia (羅文嘉) (Democratic Progressive Party)	Chen Chien-ming (陳建銘) (Taiwan Solidarity Union)	Lee Yung-ping (李永萍) (People First Party →Kuomintang)
2004 6th	Ting Shou-chung (丁守中) (Kuomintang)	Chiang Hsiao-yen (蔣孝嚴) (Kuomintang)	Fai Hrong-tai (費鴻泰) (Kuomintang)	Alex Tsai (蔡正元) (Kuomintang)	Kao Chien-chih (高建智) (Democratic Progressive Party)	Lin Chung-mo (林重謨) (Democratic Progressive Party)	Cheng Yun-peng (鄭運鵬) (Democratic Progressive Party)	Hsiao Bi-khim (蕭美琴) (Democratic Progressive Party)	Hsu Kuo-yung (徐國勇) (Democratic Progressive Party)	Lee Yung-ping (李永萍) (People First Party →Kuomintang)

=== Legislators 2008–Present ===
Election	Legislator	Party
2008 7th	Ting Shou-chung	Kuomintang
2012 8th	Ting Shou-chung	Kuomintang
2016 9th	Rosalia Wu	Democratic Progressive Party
2020 10th	Rosalia Wu	Democratic Progressive Party
2024 11th	Rosalia Wu	Democratic Progressive Party

== Election results ==
=== 2008 ===
Legislative Election 2008: Taipei City Constituency I
Party	Candidate	Votes	%	±%
Kuomintang	Ting Shou-chung	94,694	59.8	
Democratic Progressive	Kao Chien-chih	61,408	38.8	
Green	Ceng Jinpei	1,862	1.2	
Farmers	Jhang Liyuan	336	0.2	
Majority		33,286	21.0	
Total valid votes		158,300	98.97	
Rejected ballots		1,646	1.03	
Kuomintang win (new seat)				
Turnout		159,946	61.99	
Registered electors		258,007		

=== 2012 ===
Legislative Election 2012: Taipei City Constituency I
Party	Candidate	Votes	%	±%
Kuomintang	Ting Shou-chung	112,571	55.7	▼4.1
Democratic Progressive	Yang Lie	82,040	40.6	▲1.8
Green	Zhang Yujing	4,733	2.3	▲1.1
Home Party	Zhang Zhijie	2,236	1.1	New
Others	Zheng Guangzhao	690	0.3	New
Majority		30,531	15.1	▼5.9
Total valid votes		202,270	98.78	
Rejected ballots		2,496	1.22	
Kuomintang hold		Swing	▼3.0	
Turnout		204,766	77.09	▲15.1
Registered electors		265,606		

=== 2016 ===
Legislative Election 2016: Taipei City Constituency I
Party	Candidate	Votes	%	±%
Democratic Progressive	Rosalia Wu (吳思瑤)	95,369	50.84	▲10.24
Kuomintang	Ting Shou-chung (丁守中)	82,057	43.75	▼11.95
Minkuotang	Wang Ching-ya (王靜亞)	9,421	5.02	New
Independence	Huang Qingyuan (黃清原)	378	0.20	New
National Health Service Alliance	Wu Zhongzheng (吳忠崢)	348	0.19	New
Majority		13,312	7.09	N/A
Total valid votes		188,807	98.88	
Rejected ballots		2,130	1.12	
Democratic Progressive gain from Kuomintang		Swing	▲11.10	
Turnout		190,937	69.32	▼7.77
Registered electors		275,449		

=== 2020 ===
Legislative Election 2020: Taipei City Constituency I
Party	Candidate	Votes	%	±%
Democratic Progressive	Rosalia Wu (吳思瑤)	107,850	52.12	▲1.28
Kuomintang	Wang Chih-Ping (汪志冰)	83,566	40.38	▼3.37
TAPA	Adrean Lee (李婉鈺)	6,636	3.21	New
Independent	Wang Yu-yang (王郁揚)	4,004	1.94	New
Green	Jay Fang (方儉)	2,203	1.06	New
People's Democratic Party (Taiwan)	Lai Zongyu (賴宗育)	1,870	0.90	New
United Action Alliance	Sun Shijian (孫士堅)	795	0.38	New
Majority		24,284	11.74	▲4.65
Total valid votes		206,924	98.34	
Rejected ballots		3,497	1.66	
Democratic Progressive hold		Swing	▲2.33	
Turnout		210,421	76.40	▲7.08
Registered electors		275,438		

=== 2024 ===
Legislative Election 2024: Taipei City Constituency I
Party	Candidate	Votes	%	±%
Democratic Progressive	Rosalia Wu (吳思瑤)	91,958	47.22	▼4.90
Kuomintang	Chang Szu-Kang (張斯綱)	71,837	36.89	▼3.49
Independent	Hou Han-Ting (侯漢廷)	28,510	14.64	New
MiLinguall Party	Chen Alan (陳執中)	950	0.49	New
People's Democratic Party (Taiwan)	Lai Zongyu (賴宗育)	836	0.43	▼0.47
The People Union Party	Hu Chin Cheng (胡金城)	255	0.13	New
Independent	Hsu Shang Feng (許盛鋒)	231	0.12	New
The People Union Party	Zhang Tai-Sheng (張臺勝)	161	0.08	New
Majority		20,121	10.33	▼1.41
Total valid votes		194,738	98.09	
Rejected ballots		3,800	1.91	
Democratic Progressive hold		Swing	▼0.71	
Turnout		198,538	74.31	▼5.65
Registered electors		267,166		
