= Chiang Nai-shin =

Taiwanese politician

Chiang Nai-shin MLY
- 蔣乃辛
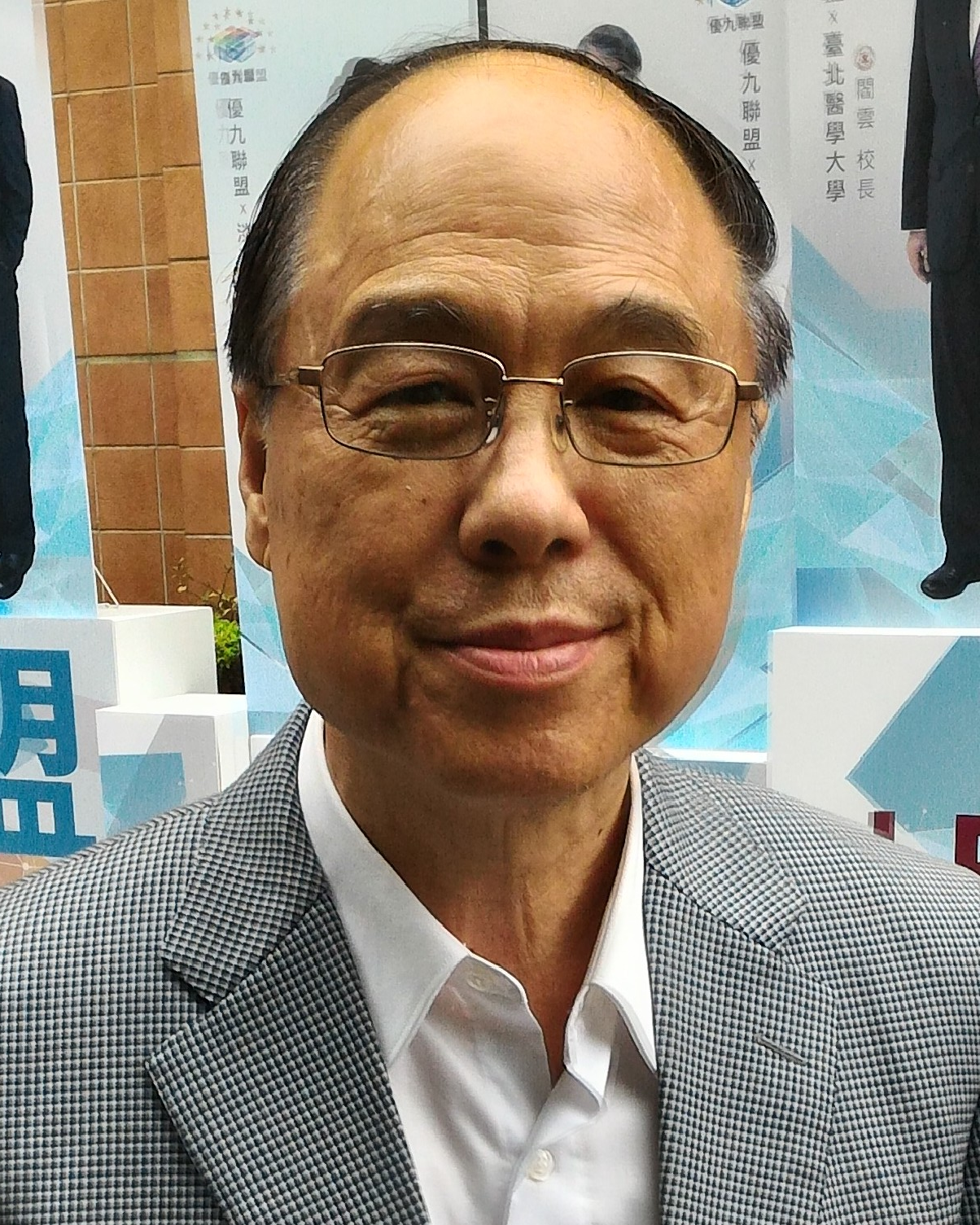

Member of the Legislative Yuan
- In office 29 March 2009 – 1 February 2020
- Preceded by: Diane Lee
- Succeeded by: Lin Yi-hua
- Constituency: Taipei 6th

Personal details
- Born: 24 September 1948 (age 77) Shanghai, Republic of China
- Party: Kuomintang
- Education: National Chengchi University (BA); Tatung University (MBA)

Chiang Nai-shin (Chinese: 蔣乃辛; pinyin: Jiǎng Nǎixīn; born 24 September 1948) is a Taiwanese politician. He served in the Taipei City Council from 1982 to 2009, when he was elected to the Legislative Yuan.

== Education ==
After graduating from National Chengchi University with a bachelor's degree in accounting and business, Chiang attended Tatung University, where he earned a master's degree in business administration.

== Political career ==
Chiang was elected to the Taipei City Council in 1981 and served until 2009. After Diane Lee resigned her legislative seat in January 2009, Chiang won a four-way primary held on 8 February to represent the Kuomintang in the resulting by-election. He subsequently defeated six other candidates in the by-election held on 28 March.

The Democratic Progressive Party nominated retired baseball player George Chao to run against Chiang in 2012. During his 2016 campaign, Chiang was first opposed by Freddy Lim, a member of the New Power Party, who soon ceded the race to fellow candidate Fan Yun of the Social Democratic Party. Chiang easily defeated Fan and Minkuotang candidate Wu Hsu-chih.
