= People's Democratic Party (Taiwan) =

People's Democratic Party 人民民主黨
- Abbreviation: PDP
- Convener: Lai Tsung-yu
- Founder: Cheng Tsun-chi
- Founded: 2 October 2011
- Preceded by: Raging Citizens Act Now!
- Headquarters: No. 33, Lane 32, Guangming Road, Sanchong District, New Taipei City
- Ideology: Socialism; Environmentalism; Minority rights
- Political position: Left-wing
- Colors: Red
- Village chiefs: 2 / 7,748

Website
- Official website

The People's Democratic Party (PDP; Chinese: 人民民主黨), known until 2017 as the People's Democratic Front (PDF; Chinese: 人民民主陣線), is a left-wing political party in Taiwan. The party has no official leadership or membership system, and instead uses a unique system of nominating electoral candidates. Supporters of the party are mainly concerned with issues such as labor rights, indigenous rights, LGBT rights, sex workers' rights, immigration, and environmental protection.

== History ==
In the 2014 local elections, PDP candidate Wang Zhian was elected as a representative of the Yanshan Li area in Shilin District, Taipei, the first and only time the PDP held office.

In June 2016, nearly 70 percent of the PDP's candidates were graduates, lecturers, or professors from the Department of Psychology at Fu Jen Catholic University, while the rest were composed of representatives from workers' unions and LGBT rights groups.

== Gallery ==
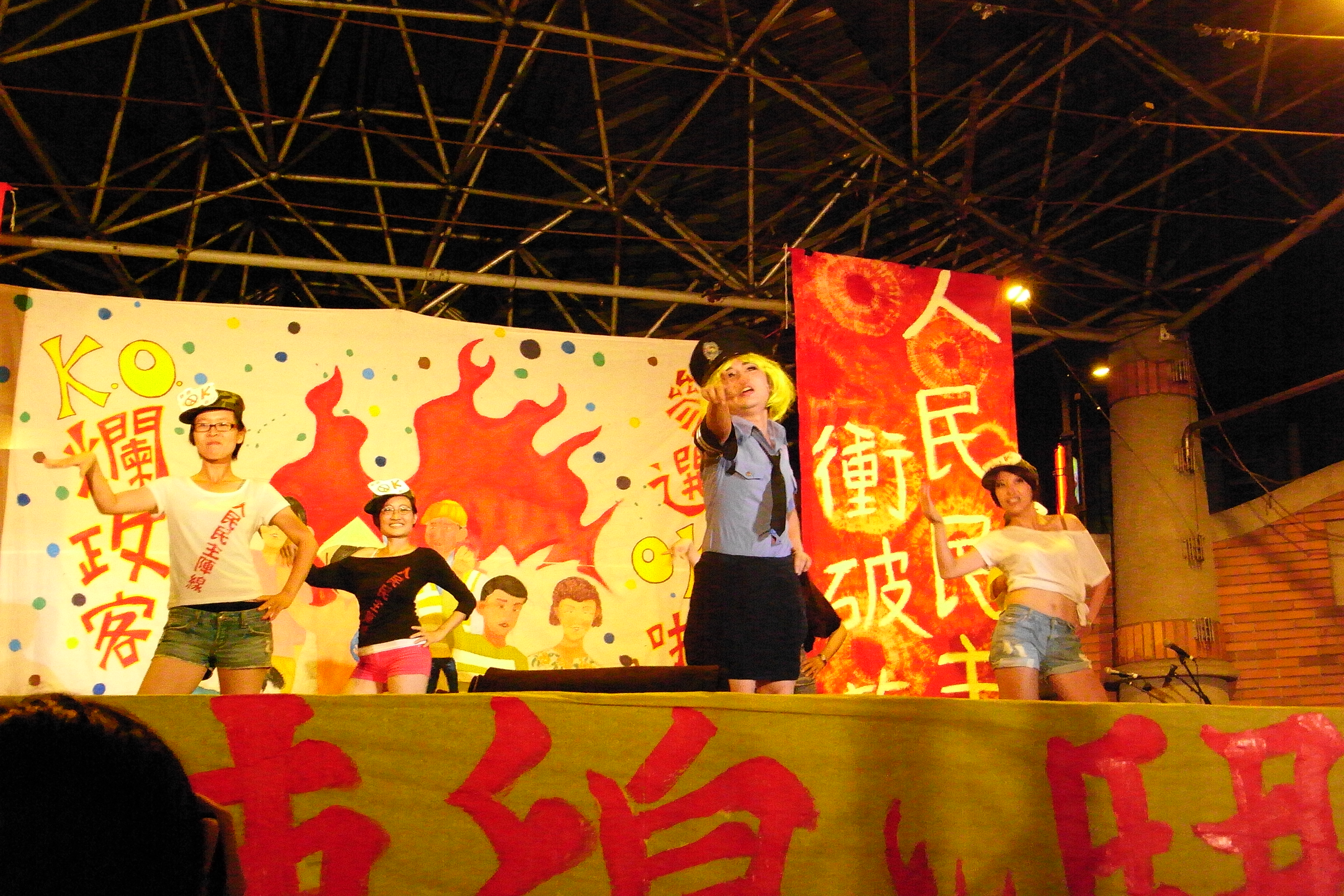
Supporters of the PDF at a fundraising event in 2014.

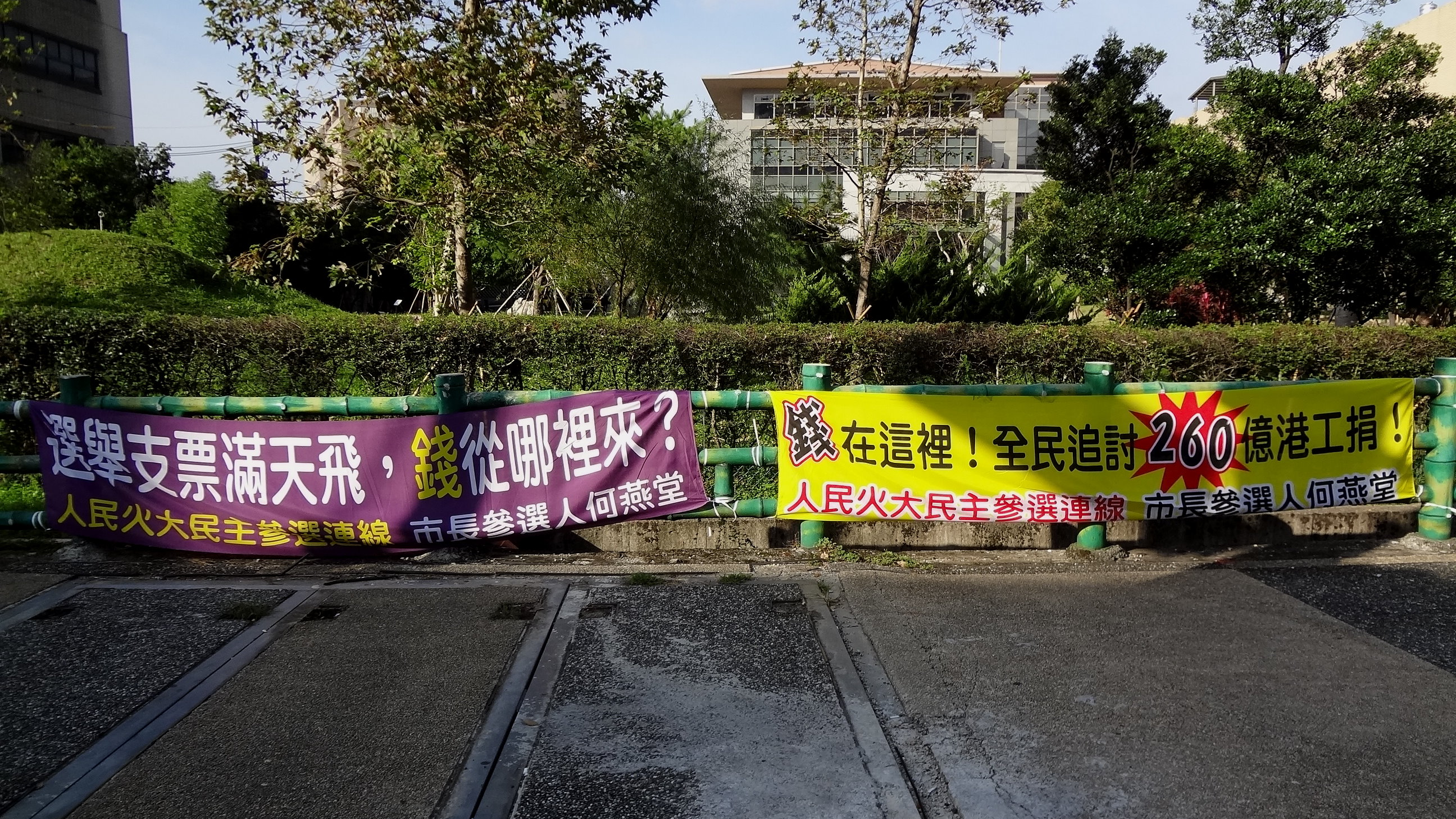
Campaign banners hung in support of the 2014 PDF mayoral candidate in Keelung.
