= Alex Tsai =

Taiwanese politician and legal scholar

Tsai Cheng-yuan MLY
- 蔡正元
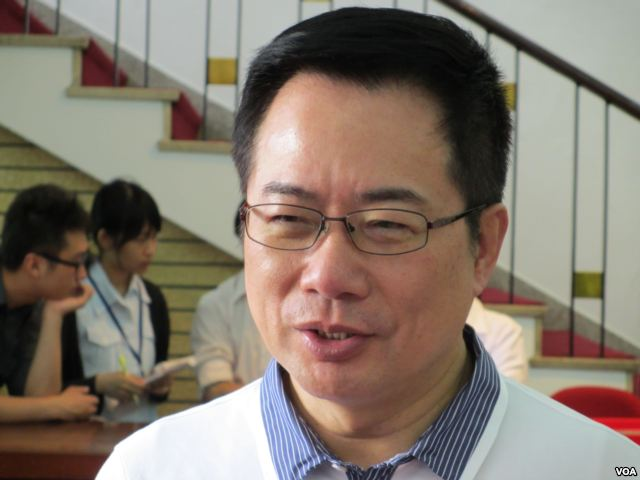
- Tsai in 2012

Member of the Legislative Yuan
- In office 1 February 2008 – 31 January 2016
- Succeeded by: Lee Yen-hsiu
- Constituency: Taipei City Constituency 4
- In office 1 February 2002 – 31 January 2008
- Constituency: Taipei City Constituency 1

Member of the National Assembly
- In office 20 May 1996 – 19 May 2000

Personal details
- Born: 25 December 1953 (age 72) Beigang, Yunlin, Taiwan
- Party: Kuomintang (after 1994); Congress Party Alliance (2018–2020)
- Education: National Taiwan Normal University (BEd); National Chengchi University (MBA); Harvard University (MPP); Columbia University (MPhil); Tsinghua University (PhD)

Tsai Cheng-yuan (Chinese: 蔡正元; pinyin: Cài Zhèngyuán; born 25 December 1953), also known by his English name Alex Tsai, is a Taiwanese politician and legal scholar. A member of the Kuomintang (KMT), he served as a member of the Legislative Yuan from 2008 to 2016. He was one of the members of the third National Assembly.

== Early life and education ==
Tsai was born in Beigang, Yunlin, on December 25, 1953. His father, Hsiu-shan, was a purchasing agent of dental equipment. As a child, Tsai worked as a child laborer in a local factory after graduating from junior high school. He graduated from Taipei Municipal Senior Vocational School of Industry and Agriculture with a specialization in mechanical engineering.

After high school, Tsai graduated from National Taiwan Normal University with a B.Ed. degree and earned an M.B.A. from National Chengchi University. He then completed graduate studies in the United States at Harvard University, earning a Master of Public Policy (M.P.P.) from the Harvard Kennedy School in 1983.

After graduating from Harvard, Tsai won a scholarship to pursue doctoral studies in economics at Columbia University, where he earned a Master of Philosophy (M.Phil.) in economics, but ultimately withdrew from the university's doctoral program (all but dissertation) after studying there from 1984 to 1987. In 2021, he completed doctoral studies at Tsinghua University and earned his Ph.D. in law from the Tsinghua University School of Law. His doctoral dissertation was titled, "The Issue of Taiwan's Territorial Sovereignty under China's Constitutional Norms".

== Embezzlement charges ==
In 2018, Tsai was indicted for embezzlement and violations of the Business Entity Accounting Act. The charges dated his tenure as chairman of the Central Motion Pictures Corporation. In 2006, CMPC shareholders approved a capital reduction plan. The Apollo Investment Company founded by Tsai held NT$430 million of the funds, and Tsai was suspected of diverting NT$280 million of the total to a personal bank account. In October 2021, the Taipei District Court sentenced Tsai to three years and six months in prison. Tsai appealed, and began serving the full sentence in March 2026, after the Taiwan High Court had rejected his final appeal in December 2025.

== Publications ==
- Complete history of Taiwan (臺灣島史記）
- Diary of an inmate (囚徒日記）
