= Justin Chou (politician) =

Taiwanese politician

Chou Shou-hsun Justin Chou MLY
- 周守訓
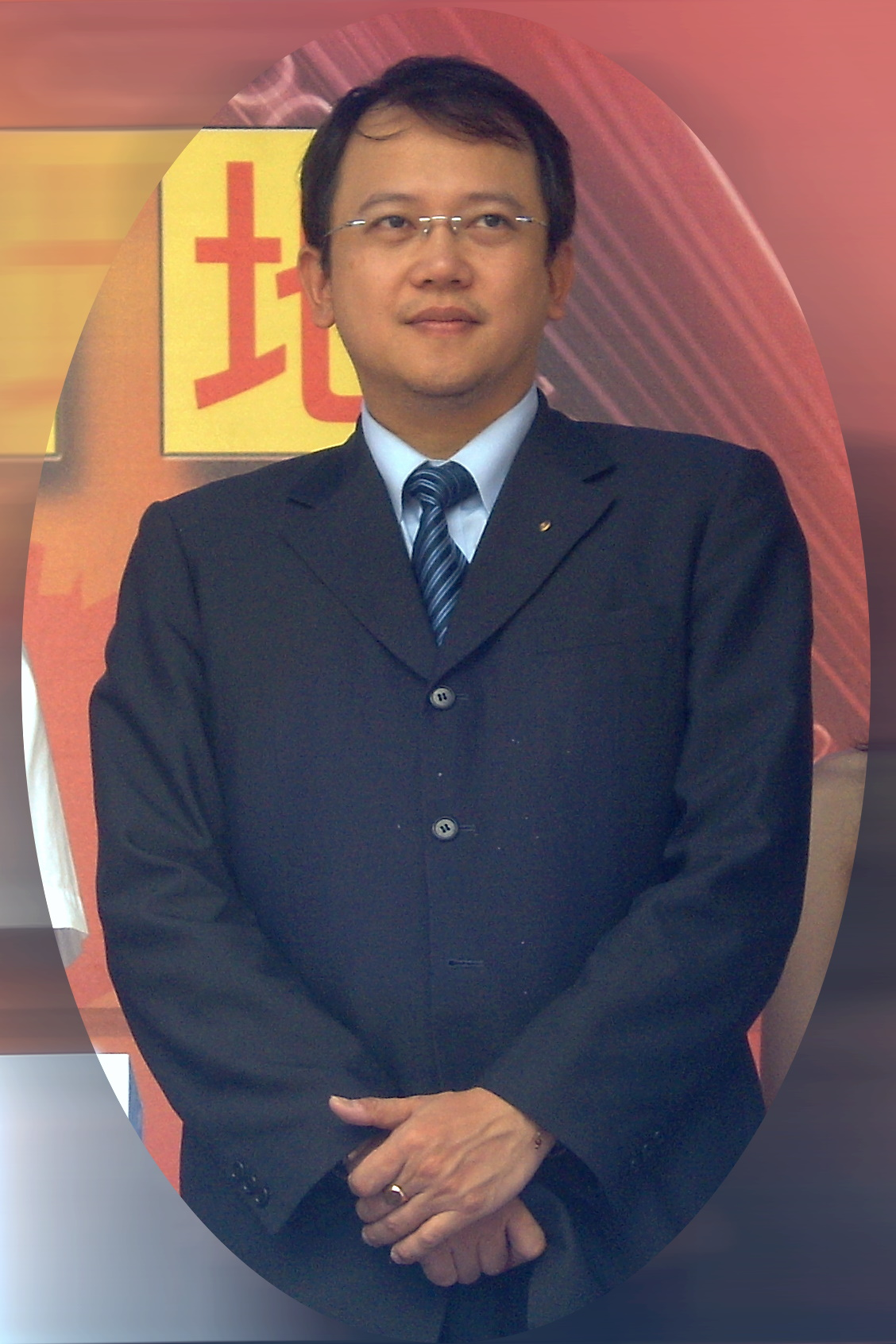
- Chou in July 2008

Member of the Legislative Yuan
- In office 1 February 2005 – 31 January 2012
- Succeeded by: Pasuya Yao
- Constituency: Taipei 2

Personal details
- Born: 27 August 1966 (age 59) Taipei, Taiwan
- Party: Kuomintang
- Spouse: Wang Yung-ho
- Education: Shih Hsin University (BA); Emerson College (MA); Cornell University (PhD)
- Occupation: Politician

Chou Shou-hsun (Chinese: 周守訓; pinyin: Zhōu Shǒuxùn; Wade–Giles: Chou^{1} Shou^{3}-hsün^{4}; born 27 August 1966) is a Taiwanese politician who served in the Legislative Yuan from 2005 to 2012. He is known in English as Justin Chou.

== Education ==
Chou attended both Chiehso and Yan Ping High Schools in Taipei before graduating from Shih Hsin University. He then pursued graduate studies in the United States, where he earned a Master of Arts (M.A.) in mass media from Emerson College in 1994 and his Ph.D. in policy analysis and administration from Cornell University in 1999.

== Political career ==
Chou began his political career as party spokesman, for the Kuomintang as a whole and specifically for the party's Culture and Communications Affairs Committee, later rising to assistant director of the committee. Chou then represented Lien Chan and James Soong, who fielded a joint ticket in the 2004 presidential elections. Chou was first elected to the Legislative Yuan in that year's legislative elections, despite the loss of the Pan-Blue coalition's presidential ticket.

During his first legislative term, Chou supported stringent monitoring of Taiwan's foreign aid budget as a buffer against checkbook diplomacy. He also brought attention to weakening infrastructure and multiple nationwide violations of the School Health Act, calling out educational institutions that did not employ the number of nutritionists the law required. Chou led allegations of forgery against National Taiwan Normal University president Huang Kuan-tsae in 2005.

In 2006, the Kuomintang Youth Corps was established. Chou contested the organization's top leadership position, and lost to Lin Yi-shih. Later that year Chou voiced public support for Taipei mayor Ma Ying-jeou, who was under investigation for corruption. In August 2007, Ma was found not guilty.

Chou won reelection to the legislature in 2008 while serving as Ma's presidential campaign manager. In his second term, Chou was rated highly by the Citizen Congress Watch. Legislative positions he held during this time included deputy secretary general of the KMT caucus. Chou also led the Foreign and National Defense Committee with Chang Hsien-yao. Chou visited Nicaragua in May 2009, as part of a government delegation led by Ma. Chou backed Chang in his bid for the Kaohsiung mayoralty in 2010. Later that year, the murder of Weng Chi-nan was solved when the suspect sought Chou out and asked him to arrange terms of surrender.

Chou faced Chen Yu-mei in a party primary during his second reelection bid until she dropped out April 2011. Chou subsequently lost the 2012 election to Pasuya Yao.

As a legislator, Chou was involved in issues pertaining to education, the foreign relations of Taiwan, immigration, and public safety. He has repeatedly criticized China for its suppression of Taiwan on the international stage.

== Career in entertainment ==
Chou has also been active in the entertainment industry as a singer and film director. He helped cast Wei Te-sheng's 2011 film Seediq Bale by working with the Ministry of National Defense to ensure aboriginal members of the military could take time off to appear on screen.

== Personal ==
Chou is married to television presenter Wang Yung-ho. Wang was selected to the National Communications Commission in 2012, but review of her nomination was continually stalled in the legislature.
