= Social Democratic Party (Taiwan) =

Social Democratic Party 社會民主黨
- Abbreviation: SDP
- Leader: Hsu Yung
- Founded: 29 March 2015
- Headquarters: 2nd Floor, No. 70, Yanping South Road, Zhongzheng, Taipei, Taiwan
- Ideology: Social democracy Progressivism (Taiwanese); Multiculturalism; Anti-imperialism
- Political position: Centre-left to left-wing
- National affiliation: Pan-Green Coalition
- Legislative Yuan: 0 / 113
- Local councillors: 1 / 912

Website
- sdp.org.tw

The Social Democratic Party (SDP) (Note: In local languages: Traditional Chinese script: 社會民主黨; Mandarin Pinyin: Shèhuì Mínzhǔ Dǎng; Hokkien: Siā-hōe Bîn-chú Tóng; Sixian Hakka: Sa-fi Mìn-chú Tóng) is a political party in Taiwan founded in 2015. In 2015, the SDP formed a coalition with the Green Party Taiwan to contest the 2016 legislative election.

Historically, the SDP is one of Taiwan's "Third Force" (第三勢力) parties, a collection of parties that do not self-claim to either the Pan-Green or Pan-Blue Coalitions and tend to be rooted in social movements. Currently, the SDP has become part of the Pan-Green camp, with more Taiwanese nationalist positions accepted and working with the Democratic Progressive Party.

== Political ideology ==
The SDP is a social-democratic and progressive party, calling for a reduction in income inequality, the protection of labour rights, the abolition of the death penalty and the legalisation of same-sex marriage. The party has also called for a reform to Taiwan's electioneering process, criticising the advantage given to parties with big financial backers.

== Electoral history ==
In the 2016 legislative election, the SDP ran in a coalition with the Green Party Taiwan, garnering 2.5% of the vote and winning no seats.

In the 2018 local elections, SDP candidate Miao Po-ya won a seat on the Taipei City Council. She is one of the first openly lesbian members of the municipal council.

Election	Mayors & Magistrates	Councils	Third-level Municipal heads	Third-level Municipal councils	Fourth-level Village heads	Election Leader
2018 unified	0 / 22	1 / 912	0 / 204	0 / 2,148	0 / 7,744	Fan Yun
2022 unified	0 / 22	1 / 912	0 / 204	0 / 2,148	0 / 7,744	Louis Lu
