= Pasuya Yao =

Taiwanese politician

Pasuya Yao Yao Wen-chih MLY
- 姚文智
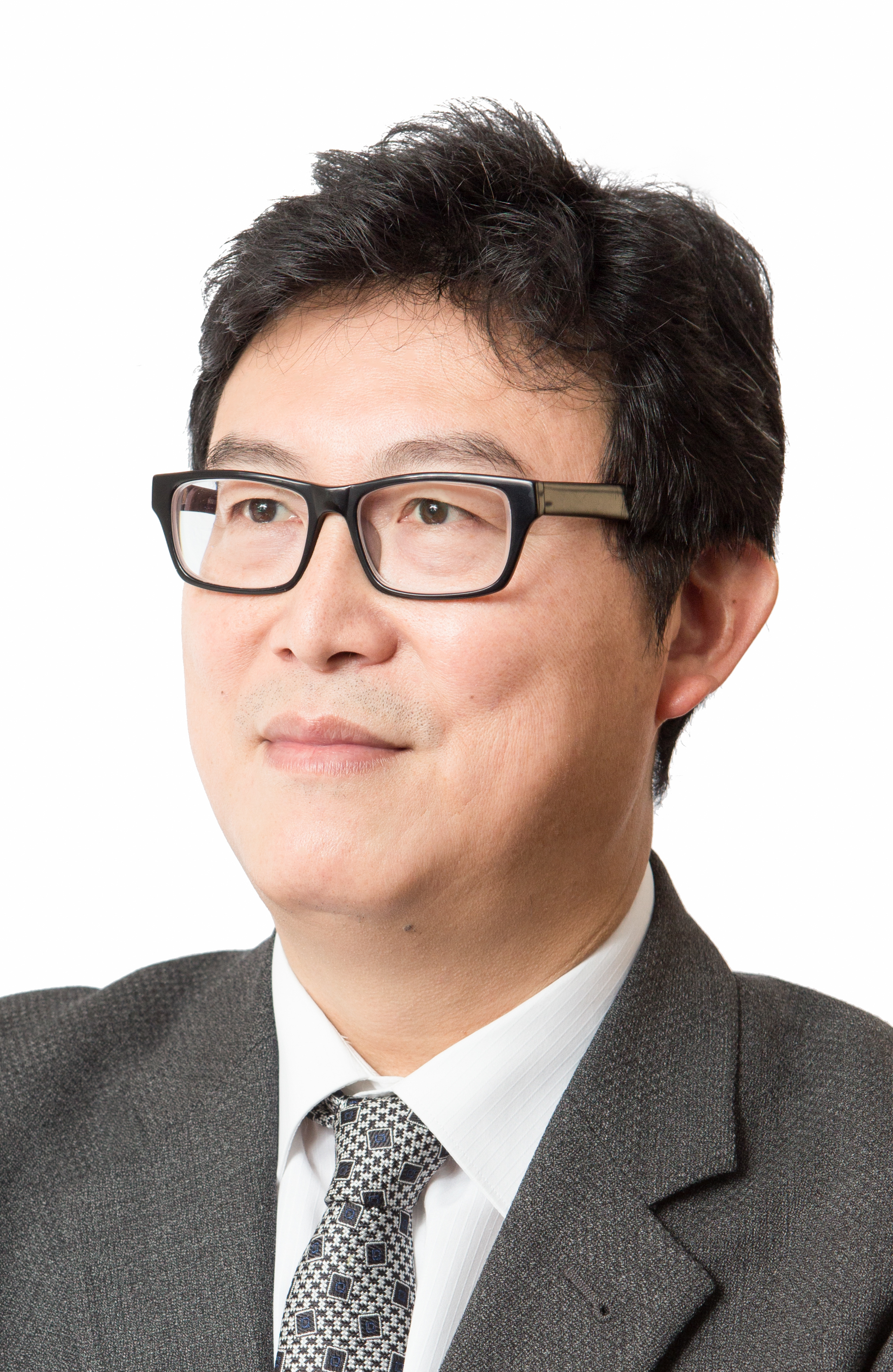
- Official portrait, 2014

Member of the Legislative Yuan
- In office 1 February 2012 – 18 November 2018
- Preceded by: Justin Chou
- Succeeded by: Ho Chih-wei
- Constituency: Taipei II

22nd Director-General of the Government Information Office
- In office 13 March 2005 – 25 January 2006
- Prime Minister: Frank Hsieh
- Preceded by: Lin Chia-lung
- Succeeded by: Cheng Wen-tsan

Personal details
- Born: 4 December 1965 (age 60) Tianmu, Shilin District, Yangmingshan, Taipei, Taiwan
- Party: Democratic Progressive Party
- Education: Fu Jen Catholic University (BA)

Yao Wen-chih (Chinese: 姚文智; pinyin: Yáo Wénzhì; Wade–Giles: Yao Wen-chih; born 4 December 1965), also known by the appropriated Tsou name Pasuya Yao, is a Taiwanese film maker and former politician. A member of the Democratic Progressive Party, he served in the Legislative Yuan from 2012 to 2018.

== Political career ==
Yao, a former journalist, was named the minister of the Government Information Office in March 2005. By 2006, he had stepped down.

=== 2014 Taipei City mayoral campaign ===
Yao ran for the mayoralty of Taipei City in the 2014 local elections. He won the first round of a party primary held in May, but lost to independent candidate Ko Wen-je in an opinion poll held the next month. The Democratic Progressive Party chose to back Ko's independent bid for the office, and he defeated Kuomintang candidate Sean Lien.

=== 2016 Republic of China legislative election ===
On 16 January 2016, Yao won the legislative election for Taipei City 2nd constituency representing Shilin District and Datong District.

2016 Republic of China Legislative Election Result
| No. | Candidate | Party | Votes | Percentage |
|---|---|---|---|---|
| 1 | Wang Ming-tzong (王銘宗) | Independent | 1,342 | 0.74% |
| 2 | Chen Min-chien (陳民乾) | Taiwan Independence Party | 865 | 0.48% |
| 3 | Wu Chun-te (吳俊德) | Faith and Hope League | 3,550 | 1.96% |
| 4 | Lin Xing-rong (林幸蓉) | National Health Service Alliance | 1,561 | 0.86% |
| 5 | Wynn Pan (潘懷宗) | New Party | 65,967 | 36.43% |
| 6 | Pasuya Yao | DPP | 107,366 | 59.29% |
| 7 | Chen Jian-bin (陳建斌) | Free Taiwan Party | 433 | 0.24% |

Yao announced that he would contest the Taipei mayoralty for the second time in July 2017. He resigned from the legislature in November 2018 to focus on his mayoral campaign.

=== 2018 Taipei City mayoral election ===
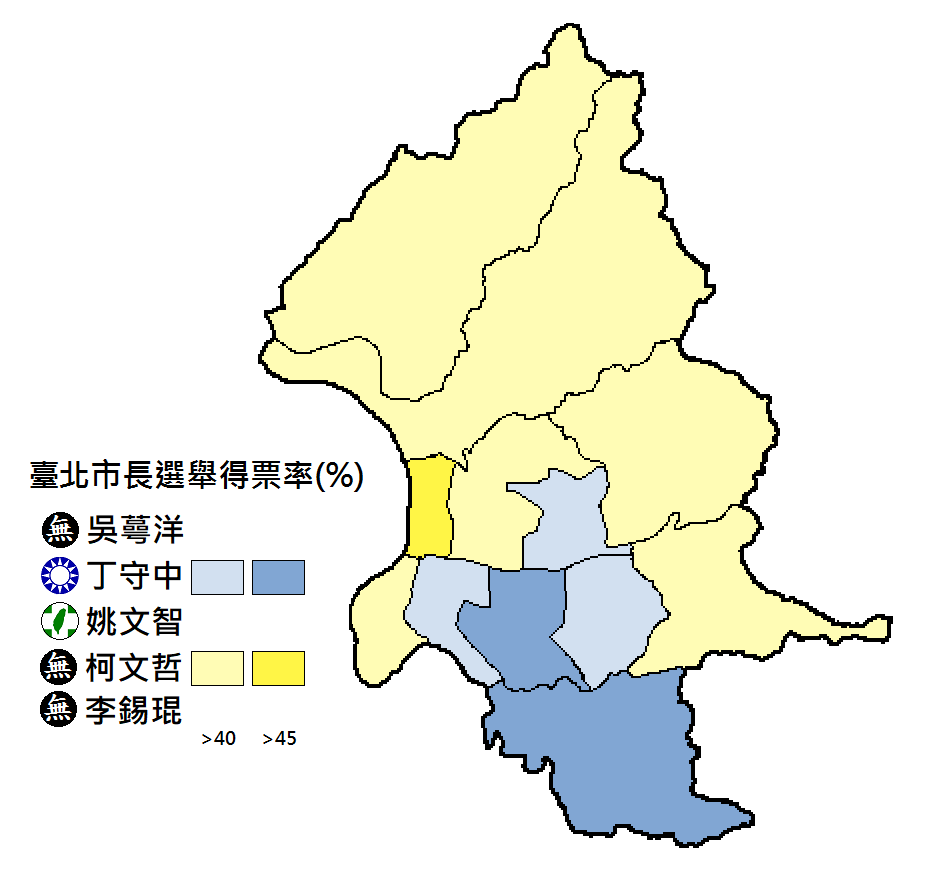
2018 Taipei City mayoral election result map

2018 Taipei City mayoral results
| No. | Candidate | Party | Votes | Percentage |
|---|---|---|---|---|
| 1 | Wu Er-yang (吳蕚洋) | Independent | 5,617 | 0.40% |
| 2 | Ting Shou-chung (丁守中) | Kuomintang | 577,566 | 40.82% |
| 3 | Pasuya Yao | Democratic Progressive Party | 244,641 | 17.29% |
| 4 | Ko Wen-je | Independent | 580,820 | 41.05% |
| 5 | Lee Si-kuen (李錫錕) | Independent | 6,172 | 0.44% |
| Total voters | | | 2,164,155 | |
| Valid votes | | | 1,414,816 | |
| Invalid votes | | | | |
| Voter turnout | | | 65.37% | |

== Filmmaking ==
Yao retired from politics after finishing third behind Ko Wen-je and Ting Shou-chung, stating that he would begin working on documentaries about activists Peng Ming-min and Cheng Nan-jung. Yao's film production company released the crowdfunded film Untold Herstory in 2022, on which Yao was credited as producer.
