= Pandemonium (Chthonic album) =

Compilation album by Chthonic
- Released: January 28, 2008
- Recorded: The Hu Studio, The Ball Studio, Borsing Recording
- Genre: Symphonic black metal; blackened death metal
- Length: 67:51
- Label: Deathlight, SPV
- Producer: Jam Borsing

Chthonic chronology
Seediq Bale (2006)	Pandemonium (2008)	Mirror of Retribution (2009)

Pandemonium is the second greatest hits compilation album from Taiwanese black metal band Chthonic. It features eleven tracks from eleven years of band history (1996 – 2007). It follows A Decade on the Throne, a live album and DVD intended for the Asian market.

A Decade on the Throne and Pandemonium are identical with regard to the track listings, up to a total of nine songs. For Pandemonium, however, seven tracks were re-recorded with the band's main drummer Dani, who, after an injury during a live show in 2005, was replaced by Reno Killerich for the recording of Seediq Bale. At the time of the release of Pandemonium, the band toured Europe and the U.S., spreading their message of an independent Taiwan that wants to contribute to international society regardless of Chinese oppression.

== Track listing ==
No.	Title	Originally from	Length
1.	"City of Obscurity"	Previously unreleased	1:28
2.	"Onset of Tragedy"	Relentless Recurrence	6:32
3.	"Revert to Mortal Territory"	Relentless Recurrence	3:27
4.	"Grab the Soul to Hell"	Relentless Recurrence	5:06
5.	"Decomposition of the Mother Isle (Aboriginal God Enthroned)"	Previously unreleased*	11:05
6.	"Floated Unconsciously in the Acheron"	9th Empyrean	6:17
7.	"Indigenous Laceration"	Seediq Bale	4:04
8.	"Bloody Gaya Fulfilled"	Seediq Bale	6:39
9.	"Quasi Putrefaction"	Seediq Bale	7:03
10.	"Guard the Isle Eternally"	9th Empyrean	8:55
11.	"Relentless Recurrence"	Relentless Recurrence	7:16

2010 Japanese release bonus track
No.	Title	Length
12.	"Painkiller" (Judas Priest cover)	6:12

- Track 5 combines "Mother Isle Disintegrated, Aboriginal Gods Enthroned" from Where the Ancestors' Souls Gathered with "Mother Isle Disintegrated, Aboriginal Gods Enthroned (Chapter 2)" from 9th Empyrean.

== Personnel ==
- Freddy Lim a.k.a. Freddy, Left Face of Maradou – lead vocals
- Jesse Liu a.k.a. Jesse, the Infernal – lead guitar, rhythm guitar, acoustic guitars
- Doris Yeh a.k.a. Doris, Thunder Tears – bass guitar, backing vocals
- Dani Wang a.k.a. Dani, the Azathothian Hands – drums, percussion
- CJ, Dispersed Fingers – keyboards, synth, piano
- Su-Nung, the Bloody String – erhu
