= Liu Yi-te =

Taiwanese politician

- 劉一德

Chairman of the Taiwan Solidarity Union
- In office 16 April 2016 – 29 January 2024
- Preceded by: Lin Chih-chia (acting); Huang Kun-huei
- Succeeded by: Chou Ni-an

Member of the National Assembly
- In office 1 February 1992 – 20 May 2000
- Constituency: Taipei

Personal details
- Born: 15 April 1960 (age 65) Chiayi, Taiwan
- Party: Taiwan Solidarity Union (since 2001)
- Other political affiliations: Democratic Progressive Party (until 2001)
- Education: National Taiwan University (BA); Tamkang University (MA)

Liu Yi-te (Chinese: 劉一德; born 15 April 1960) is a Taiwanese politician. While affiliated with the Democratic Progressive Party, he was a member of the National Assembly between 1992 and 2000. He joined the Taiwan Solidarity Union upon its establishment in 2001, and served as party chairman from 2016 to 2024.

== Early life and education ==
Liu is of waishengren descent, and became active in the tangwai movement as a student. In a 2001 interview, Liu credited a classmate at Chiayi Senior High School with sparking his interest in politics by reporting Liu to administration for harboring anti-government views, after Liu had tried to start a discussion about a local politician. As Taiwan was then a one-party state led by the Kuomintang, Liu was slapped upon refusing to retract his comments about the politician in a written statement. Liu later met Lee Wen-chung and Lai Chin-lin at National Taiwan University (NTU), where he led a club advocating for Taiwan independence. Liu graduated from NTU in 1984 with a Bachelor of Arts (B.A.) in political science, then completed graduate studies at Tamkang University.

== Political career ==
Liu ran in the December 1991 National Assembly elections and took office in 1992 as a representative of Taipei. He won reelection in 1996, and was named Democratic Progressive Party caucus leader. From this position, Liu worked with senior Kuomintang members of the National Assembly and passed a resolution to extend the term of the National Assembly while also reducing its membership by mandating that the next assembly election take place under a system of proportional representation. The passage of the resolution drew criticism from both the Kuomintang and Democratic Progressive Party headquarters. The Judicial Yuan ruled against the term extension in 2000, but Liu subsequently supported an initiative to postpone the election date of 6 May mandated by the Judicial Yuan. Liu later chastised members of the Judicial Yuan and worked with Kuomintang assembly delegates to remove the justices' lifetime stipend, though he refused to endorse abolition of the Judicial Yuan itself. Another vote on the fate of the National Assembly was taken in April 2000, in which Liu and Chen Chin-te of the DPP, as well as their KMT counterparts, agreed to end the National Assembly on 20 May 2000, passing many of its powers to the Legislative Yuan. After stepping down from the National Assembly, Liu was named director of the DPP's organizational development department.

He formed an electoral coalition in January 2001 with Chen Chin-te, Chen Tsiao-long, Chiu Kuo-chang, Kang Tai-shan, and Lan Shih-tsung, but did not win election to the Legislative Yuan that December. By June of that year, Liu had been approached by a pro-Taiwan alliance that later became the Taiwan Solidarity Union, which Liu joined instead. He was named president of the Independence Evening Post in July 2001, shortly before the publication released its last issue in October.

Liu represented the Taiwan Solidarity Union in the 2004 legislative elections, but did not win. Afterwards, Liu became director of the TSU's organization department. In August 2005, Liu pushed the Democratic Progressive Party to rescind a mayoral nomination given to Wang Tuoh in Keelung, stating that if the DPP did not do so, Liu himself would enter the Chiayi mayoral contest to challenge the DPP. Liu did register as a Chiayi mayoral candidate, but withdrew when Wang did the same in Keelung. Liu again challenged the Democratic Progressive Party in 2007, contesting the legislative seat won by Yu Tian.

By 2007, Liu had become a deputy secretary-general of the TSU. From this position, Liu helped the party deliver petitions to the Control Yuan and the judicial branch. He also announced electoral strategy in 2011 and 2014. Liu defeated Chen Chien-ming in an April 2016 leadership election, and succeeded Lin Chih-chia, who was serving as acting chairman of the Taiwan Solidarity Union at the time.
