= Bu-Tik =

Bú-Tik

Studio album by ChthoniC
- Released: May 29, 2013 (JP, TW); May 31, 2013 (FI, International); June 3, 2013 (UK); June 25, 2013 (North America)
- Recorded: January 2013 – February 2013 Harplinge, Sweden
- Genres: Symphonic black metal; melodic death metal; oriental metal
- Length: 40:36
- Labels: Spinefarm / Universal; Howling Bull (JP)
- Producer: Rickard Bengtsson

ChthoniC chronology
Takasago Army (2011)	Bú-Tik (2013)	Battlefields of Asura (2018)

Singles from Bú-Tik
- 1. "Defenders of Bú-Tik Palace" Released: May 19, 2013

Bú-Tik (Chinese: 武德) is the seventh studio album from Taiwanese black metal band Chthonic. It was released by Spinefarm Records on May 29, 2013, in Asia; June 3, 2013, in the United Kingdom; and June 25, 2013, in North America. Bú-Tik is the group's third record to be released through Spinefarm Records, and their second to have been produced and mixed by Rickard Bengtsson.

== Composition ==
Speaking with Metalholic, bassist Doris Yeh compared the production of Bú-Tik to that of Takasago Army, stating, "The music production of Bú-Tik is very close to Takasago Army which we are quite satisfied with it. The structures of songs of Bú-Tik are a little bit different from Takasago Army. Songs of Bú-Tik are more fluent, smooth, and natural." Commenting on the song writing process for Bú-Tik, vocalist Freddy Lim told Sonic Shocks, "I think the band especially the song writing process has become more natural, it’s much easier for me and Jesse to find the right balance for taking our souls and finding the right inspiration to music."

== Promotion ==
Along with a track-by-track review by Doris Yeh, the album's fourth track "Next Republic" was made available for streaming on April 22, 2013, through Terrorizer. A music video for the track "Defenders of Bú-Tik Palace" directed by Chuang Chi-wen and choreographed by Jeremy Yang was released on May 7, 2013. An additional music video directed by Lin Chun, for the track "Sail into the Sunset's Fire", was released on May 24, 2013. The video was filmed during a rain storm at an outdoors swimming pool. On June 4, 2013, a full-stream of the album was posted on SoundCloud by Spinefarm Records. On June 10, 2013, a third video directed by Cheng Wen-tang and Chang Yih-feng for the track "Supreme Pain for the Tyrant" debuted on Revolver.

== Album cover ==
The album cover art was revealed on April 1, 2013. It was said by the band that the artwork was created to depict the theme of the album which was "the idea of an armed body and mind". The image is made of the features of an elder, child, and girl model. The female model depicted in the cover, Bu (小布), was chosen of nearly a hundred volunteer candidates. The album cover was designed by Oink Chen and with photography by 林峻.

== Reception ==
Professional ratings
Review scores
Source	Rating
About.com	4/5 stars
AsiaOne	favorable
Blabbermouth.net	10/10
Exclaim!	7/10
Metal Injection	8/10

=== Critical reception ===
Bú-Tik has received mainly positive reviews from professional critics. Edward Banchs of About.com commented on the records distinctiveness, "Gravely overlooked, Chthonic have crafted a unique sound in an otherwise repetitive genre, with an identity that speaks to pride as much as it speaks to the thrash influenced aggression that band unleashes with each record, and Bu-Tik is no exception." Ray Van Horn, Jr. of Blabbermouth.net gave the album a ten out of ten and likened it to their 2006 record Seediq Bale, stating "CHTHONIC has proven themselves true to their own cause and should anyone have been worried that [...] the corroding brutality of "Seedig Bale" [sic] has been relegated to the past, then "Bú-Tik" will dissolve those notions."

=== Awards ===
For their work on Bú-Tik, the group won three awards during Taiwan's Golden Music Awards, including: "Best Album Award", "Best Band" and "Best Musician". The group was nominated for seven awards at the event.

== Track listing ==
Bú-Tik album track listing adapted from Allmusic.

No.	Title	Writer(s)	Length
1.	"Arising Armament" (Intro)	Hsu Shu Chuan, Chen Po Jen, CJ Kao, Freddy Lim, Huang Zi Ling, Chen Yan Ting	2:27
2.	"Supreme Pain for the Tyrant"	Joe Henley, Freddy Lim, Jesse Liu	4:45
3.	"Sail into the Sunset's Fire"	Joe Henley, Freddy Lim, Jesse Liu	4:00
4.	"Next Republic": "Track begins with a five second excerpt of the song "台灣民族主義" (Literally translated "Taiwanese nationalism"), sung by Su Beng."	Joe Henley, Freddy Lim, Jesse Liu	4:12
5.	"Rage of my Sword"	Joe Henley, Freddy Lim, Jesse Liu	4:37
6.	"Between Silence and Death"	Joe Henley, Freddy Lim, Jesse Liu	4:38
7.	"Resurrection Pyre"	Joe Henley, Freddy Lim, Jesse Liu	4:59
8.	"Set Fire to the Island"	Joe Henley, Freddy Lim, Jesse Liu	3:47
9.	"Defenders of Bú-tik Palace"	Joe Henley, Freddy Lim, Jesse Liu	5:22
10.	"Undying Rearmament" (Outro)	Hsu Shu Chuan, Chen Po Jen, Huang Zi Ling, Chen Yan Ting	1:49
Total length:			40:36

== Personnel ==
Bú-Tik album personnel adapted from Allmusic.

Chthonic

- Freddy Lim, "Left Face of Maradou" – vocals, composer
- Jesse Liu, "the Infernal" – guitar, engineer
- Doris Yeh, "Thunder Tears" – bass, choir
- Dani Wang, "Azathothian Hands" – drums
- CJ Kao, "Dispersed Fingers" – keyboards, synthesizer, engineer, composer

Additional personnel

- Meiyun Tang – guest vocals on "Defenders of Bú-Tik Palace"
- Su Beng – guest vocals on "Next Republic"
- Lin Chi-an – choir, chorus
- Hsu Shu Chuan – composer, conch, dizi, shakuhachi
- Achino Chang – shehnai
- Joe Henley – composer
- Huang Zi Ling – composer
- Chen Yan Ting – composer
- Chen Po Jen – composer, crystal bowl
- Rickard Bengtsson – production, engineer, mixing at Sweet Spot studio, Halmstad, Sweden
- Mats Lindfors – mastering
- Luxia Wu – engineer
- Anita Chia – assistant
- Kris Yeh – assistant
- Oink Yang-De Chen – design
- 林峻 – photography
- Kuo Yu-Tang – stylist
