= New Taipei City Constituency 12 =

Constituency of the Legislative Yuan of Taiwan

- Single-member constituency for the Legislative Yuan
- District(s): Jinshan, Wanli, Xizhi, Pingxi, Ruifang, Shuangxi, & Gongliao

Current constituency
- Created: 2008
- Members: Lee Ching-hua (2008–2016); Huang Kuo-chang (2016–2020); Lai Pin-yu (2020–2024); Liao Hsien-Hsiang (2024–present)

New Taipei City Constituency 12 (Chinese: 新北市第十二選舉區; pinyin: Xīnběi Shì Dì-shí-èr Xuǎnjǔ Qū) includes districts along the northeastern coast of New Taipei City. The district was formerly known as Taipei County Constituency 12 (2008–2010) and was created in 2008, when all local constituencies of the Legislative Yuan were reorganized to become single-member districts.

== Current district ==
- Jinshan
- Wanli
- Xizhi
- Pingxi
- Ruifang
- Shuangxi
- Gongliao

== Legislators ==
Legislator for New Taipei City Constituency 12
Parliament	Years	Member	Party
Constituency split from Taipei Country Constituency III
7th	2008–2012	Lee Ching-hua (李慶華)	Kuomintang
8th	2012–2016	Lee Ching-hua (李慶華)	Kuomintang
9th	2016–2020	Huang Kuo-chang (黃國昌)	New Power Party
10th	2020–2024	Lai Pin-yu (賴品妤)	Democratic Progressive Party
11th	2024–present	Liao Hsien-Hsiang	Kuomintang

== Election results ==
=== 2016 ===
Legislative Election 2016: New Taipei City Constituency 12
Party	Candidate	Votes	%	±%
NPP	Huang Kuo-chang	80,508	51.51	
Kuomintang	Lee Ching-hua	68,318	43.71	
Others	Chen Yongshun	4,892	3.13	
Others	Zhong Guozhi	2,548	1.63	
Majority		12190	7.80	
Total valid votes		156,266	97.59	
Rejected ballots		3,855	2.41	
NPP gain from Kuomintang		Swing		
Turnout		160,121	63.74	
Registered electors		251,191		

=== 2020 ===
Legislative Election 2020: New Taipei City Constituency 12
Party	Candidate	Votes	%	±%
Democratic Progressive	Lai Pin-yu (賴品妤)	84,393	45.36	New
Kuomintang	Li Yongping (李永萍)	81,613	43.87	▲0.16
NPP	Lai Jialun (賴嘉倫)	13,563	7.29	▼44.22
Green	Zhang Zhiwei (張志偉)	1,638	0.88	New
Independent	Zhou Wurong (周武榮)	1,620	0.87	New
Chinese Unification Promotion Party	Zhang Yiwei (張依維)	316	0.17	New
Majority		2,780	1.49	N/A
Total valid votes		186,032		
Rejected ballots				
Democratic Progressive gain from Kuomintang		Swing		
Turnout				
Registered electors				

=== 2024 ===
Legislative Election 2024: New Taipei City Constituency 12
Party	Candidate	Votes	%	±%
Kuomintang	Liao Hsien-Hsiang	92,489	50.83	▲6.96
Democratic Progressive	Lai Pin-yu	81,937	45.03	▼0.33
MiLinguall Party	Li Grace	3,170	1.74	New
Independent	Huang Jui Chuan	2,348	1.29	New
Independent	Yang Mu-Hou	1,023	0.56	New
Taiwan Renewal Party	Chen Chang Chih	980	0.54	New
Majority		10,552	5.80	N/A
Total valid votes		181,947		
Kuomintang gain from Democratic Progressive		Swing	▲3.65	
