= Chen Tsiao-long =

Taiwanese politician

Chen Tsiao-long MLY
- 陳朝龍

Member of the Legislative Yuan
- In office 1 February 2002 – 31 January 2008
- Constituency: Taipei County 3

Personal details
- Born: 1 October 1953 (age 72)
- Party: Democratic Progressive Party
- Education: National Taipei University of Technology (BS, MA)

Chen Tsiao-long (Chinese: 陳朝龍; pinyin: Chén Cháolóng; born 1 October 1953) is a Taiwanese politician who served two terms as a member of the Legislative Yuan from 2002 to 2008.

== Education ==
Chen studied electrical engineering at the National Taipei University of Technology.

== Political career ==
Chen served on the National Assembly before taking office in the Legislative Yuan. In the 2001 legislative elections, Chen Tsiao-long and Chen Chin-te formed an electoral coalition with four other politicians. As the election drew nearer, Chen campaigned alongside Wang Shu-hui and Lai Chin-lin. Chen Tsiao-long won a second term in 2004, and was renominated for a third after defeating Shen Fa-hui in a party primary. During his third legislative campaign, Chen was placed under investigation of electoral fraud, and he subsequently lost to Lee Ching-hua in January 2008. Days after the election, Chen was indicted on charges of vote buying. While a member of the Legislative Yuan, Chen also served on the Democratic Progressive Party's Central Review Committee, and as convenor of the legislature's Transportation Committee.

Chen backed pension reform, and supported tougher laws on privacy of personal information. Chen maintained an interest in the environment, drawing attention to related issues such as erosion and the Lungmen Nuclear Power Plant. Chen was also active in discussions on foreign relations, advocating in December 2002 that a ban on Indonesian workers remain in place after Hassan Wirajuda stated that Taiwanese government officials were not welcome in Indonesia. In 2007, Chen supported a proposed referendum to replace the Republic of China with Taiwan as the nation's official name, believing that the referendum could invalidate the Constitution's articles on retaining the Republic of China as the official name.

Chen was injured in a traffic collision en route to a campaign event for Luo Wen-jia in 2005, and resolved to promote amendments to the Road Traffic Management and Punishment Law. His efforts were largely unsuccessful until 2006, when Jason Hu and his wife were hurt in a similar incident. Though fines were introduced for drivers if passengers were not wearing seat belts while traveling on freeways, a related proposal to make seat belt use compulsory did not pass at the time. A bill proposed by the Ministry of Transportation and Communications in 2011 was later passed and took effect as law, with a special provision that placed fines directly on the passengers of taxis if they did not comply with verbal and written instructions for seat belt use.
