= Mirror of Retribution =

- Mirror of Retribution Album Cover

Studio album by ChthoniC
- Released: August 10th, 2009 (EU); September 1st, 2009 (US)
- Genre: Symphonic black metal; melodic black metal; Oriental metal
- Length: 44:13
- Label: Spinefarm
- Producer: Chthonic, Rob Caggiano

ChthoniC chronology
Pandemonium (2007)	Mirror of Retribution (2009)	Takasago Army (2011)

Professional ratings
Review scores
Source	Rating
Allmusic	3.5/5 stars

Mirror of Retribution is the fifth studio album by Taiwanese black metal band Chthonic, released in 2009. The album, as with previous albums is based upon concepts of historical facts (as with previous studio album Seediq Bale), an ancient myth of hell, and contains references to the 228 Massacre. The band adopted a new logo starting with this album, as seen on its cover; as well as a new stage presence based upon Taoist magic figures of folklore and the types of facial masks they wore.

== Track listing ==
No.	Title	Length
1.	"Autoscopy (Intro)"	1:57
2.	"Blooming Blades"	4:41
3.	"Hearts Condemned"	4:31
4.	"Venom in My Veins"	3:02
5.	"The Aroused"	5:07
6.	"Sing-Ling Temple"	4:07
7.	"1947"	4:18
8.	"Forty-Nine Theurgy Chains"	3:36
9.	"Rise of the Shadows"	4:09
10.	"Bloody Waves of Sorrow"	4:49
11.	"Spell of Setting Sun: Mirror of Retribution"	5:56

English edition bonus track
No.	Title	Length
11.	"Unlimited Taiwan"	4:43

== Personnel ==
- Freddy Lim – vocals, hena
- Jesse Liu – guitar
- Dani Wang – drums
- Doris Yeh – bass
- CJ – piano, synthesizer
