= Takasago Army =

- Takasago Army Album Cover

Studio album by ChthoniC
- Released: August 2011 (EU); September 6, 2011 (US)
- Recorded: Spring 2011 at Sweet Spot Studios in Halmstad, Sweden
- Genres: Symphonic black metal; oriental metal
- Length: 40:37
- Label: Spinefarm
- Producer: Rickard Bengtsson

ChthoniC chronology
Mirror of Retribution (2009)	Takasago Army (2011)	Bu-Tik (2013)

Singles from Takasago Army
- 1. "Takao" Released: June 7, 2011; 2. "Broken Jade" Released: July 6, 2011; 3. "Quell The Souls In Sing Ling Temple" Released: November 17, 2011

Professional ratings
Review scores
Source	Rating
Blistering	10/10 stars
Rock Sound	7/10 stars
Revolver	3.5/5 stars

Takasago Army is the sixth studio album by Taiwanese extreme metal band Chthonic, released in 2011. The title is a reference to the Takasago Volunteers in the Imperial Japanese Army, recruited from the Taiwanese aboriginal tribes during World War II. Takasago (Chinese: 高砂, Japanese: タカサゴ) is an ancient Japanese name for Taiwan. This album serves as the final record in Chthonic's "Souls Reposed" Trilogy.

== Background ==
=== Theme ===
The album's front cover art depicts a WWII Takasago Army volunteer marking himself as "Seediq" (an act forbidden by the Japanese), although he is now serving in the Japanese military. This illustrates the conflict many of these soldiers had with their identity as Japanese soldiers and their heritage as Taiwanese Seediq warriors.

According to the band's press release statement, "This album, Takasago Army, seeks to expose the part of Taiwan's history that the government attempts to cover up through the interior conflict on identity of former Taiwanese soldiers. The album also seeks to showcase the quest of the Taiwanese for values and dignity as human beings through the tragic roles of the Taiwanese during World War II. Bridging the story of the fourth album Seediq Bale, which took place in 1930, and the story of the fifth album Mirror Of Retribution, which took place in 1947, the latest album Takasago Army, which recounts the story that occurred from 1940 to 1945, was actually the last puzzle of Chthonic's trilogy."

=== Recording and Production ===
In an interview with Metalship, Freddy Lim commented on the band's songwriting process for Takasago Army, saying: "In the early years, we played a kind of metal like the western kind. And the more we played, the more we put Taiwanese elements into the music. All particularly in the new album Takasago Army, the whole 'writing' philosophy has been changed. We used to write metal, and then add some Taiwanese feelings and emotions, but this time I write Taiwanese songs. Basically they all are Taiwanese songs, Taiwanese folk songs or Taiwanese pop songs, I don't know how to define them, and then Jesse and I made them heavier. Now, we start to have another writing process, that is more natural."

Takasago Army was co-produced by Chthonic and Rickard Bengtsson, Mastered By Mats "limpan " Lindfors

== Promotion ==
=== Music Videos ===
Music videos have officially been released for the singles "Takao", "Broken Jade", and "Quell The Souls In Sing Ling Temple" respectively.

The first video released, "Takao", was recorded in one 26-hour session. The video received over 15,000 views during the first few days of its debut on YouTube.

Both "Takao" and "Broken Jade" were directed by Chuang Chih-Wen.

=== Headlining Tours ===
Chthonic played a series of headlining shows across Asia in the "Chthonic Heavy-Armed Tour 2011" which spanned from July 10, 2011, to August 7, 2011.
The band donated 10% of the ticket sales made on their Taiwan performance at the Sound Livehouse to the Taiwanese Old Soldiers Cultural Association.

Chthonic (with special guest Randy Blythe of Lamb of God) performed at the Sing-Ling Temple in Puli, Taiwan, a historical landmark that is referred to on their albums "Takasago Army" and "Mirror of Retribution", on October 22, 2011. The concert was divinely approved of by the temple's deities and drew in over 1,000 fans from across the world.

=== Supporting Tours ===
Chthonic toured with Arch Enemy, Devildriver, and Skeletonwitch, in the "North American Khaos Tour 2011" from September 8, 2011, to October 4, 2011.

Chthonic and Kiuas supported Turisas in the "Stand Up Fight" tour through the U.K. which began on October 27, 2011, and ended November 17, 2011.

Chthonic took part in the "Khaos Over Europe Tour" with Warbringer, and Arch Enemy from December 7, 2011, to December 22, 2011.

== Track listing ==
=== Taiwanese version ===
- Digipak
1. "冥河島" – 2:15
2. "殘枝" – 4:21
3. "皇軍" – 4:19
4. "震洋" – 3:44
5. "南十字星" – 3:53
6. "薰空" – 5:38
7. "玉碎" – 5:43
8. "歸根" – 1:24
9. "大黑天" – 4:02
10. "鎮魂醒靈寺" - 5:18

=== English version ===
- Jewel case
1. "The Island" – 2:15
2. "Legacy Of The Seediq" – 4:21
3. "Takao" – 4:19
4. "Oceanquake" – 3:44
5. "Southern Cross" – 3:53
6. "KAORU" – 5:38
7. "Broken Jade" – 5:43
8. "Root Regeneration" – 1:24
9. "MAHAKALA" – 4:02
10. "Quell The Souls In Sing Ling Temple" - 5:18

=== Japanese version ===
- Jewel case
1. "The Island"
2. "Legacy Of The Seediq"
3. "Takao"
4. "Oceanquake"
5. "Southern Cross"
6. "KAORU"
7. "Broken Jade"
8. "Root Regeneration"
9. "MAHAKALA"
10. "Quell The Souls In Sing Ling Temple"
11. "Mirror Of Retribution (live recording at LOUD PARK 2010)" [Japanese ed. bonus track]
12. 49 Theurgy Chains (live recording at LOUD PARK 2010)" [Japanese ed. bonus track]
13. "Takao (Single Version)" [Japanese ed. bonus track]

== Personnel ==
As it is listed in the CD liner notes.

=== Chthonic ===
- Freddy, Left Face of Maradou – vocals, Er-Hu
- Jesse, the Infernal – guitar, backing vocals
- Doris, Thunder Tears – bass guitar, backing vocals
- Dani, Azathothian Hands – drums
- CJ, Dispersed Fingers – keyboards, synthesizer

=== Guest Musicians ===
- Su-nung Chao - Hena Player
- Pitero Wukah, Mahon - Pgaku Flute (The Island, Southern Cross, Root Regeneration)
- Yu Tian - Guest Singer (Takao)
- Chan Ya Wen - Guest Singer (KAORU)
- Pitero Wukah - Spoken Word (Root Regeneration)

=== Production ===
- Doris Yeh - Coordinator
- Oink Yang-de Chen - Artwork
- A-Ling Tseng - Photographer
- Produced by Chthonic and Rickard Bengtson
- Mixed by Rickard Bengtson
- Mastered by Mats Limpan Lindfors
- Released by Spinefarm Records/ Universal Music
