= Lai Chin-lin =

Taiwanese politician (born 1962)

Lai Chin-lin MLY
- 賴勁麟
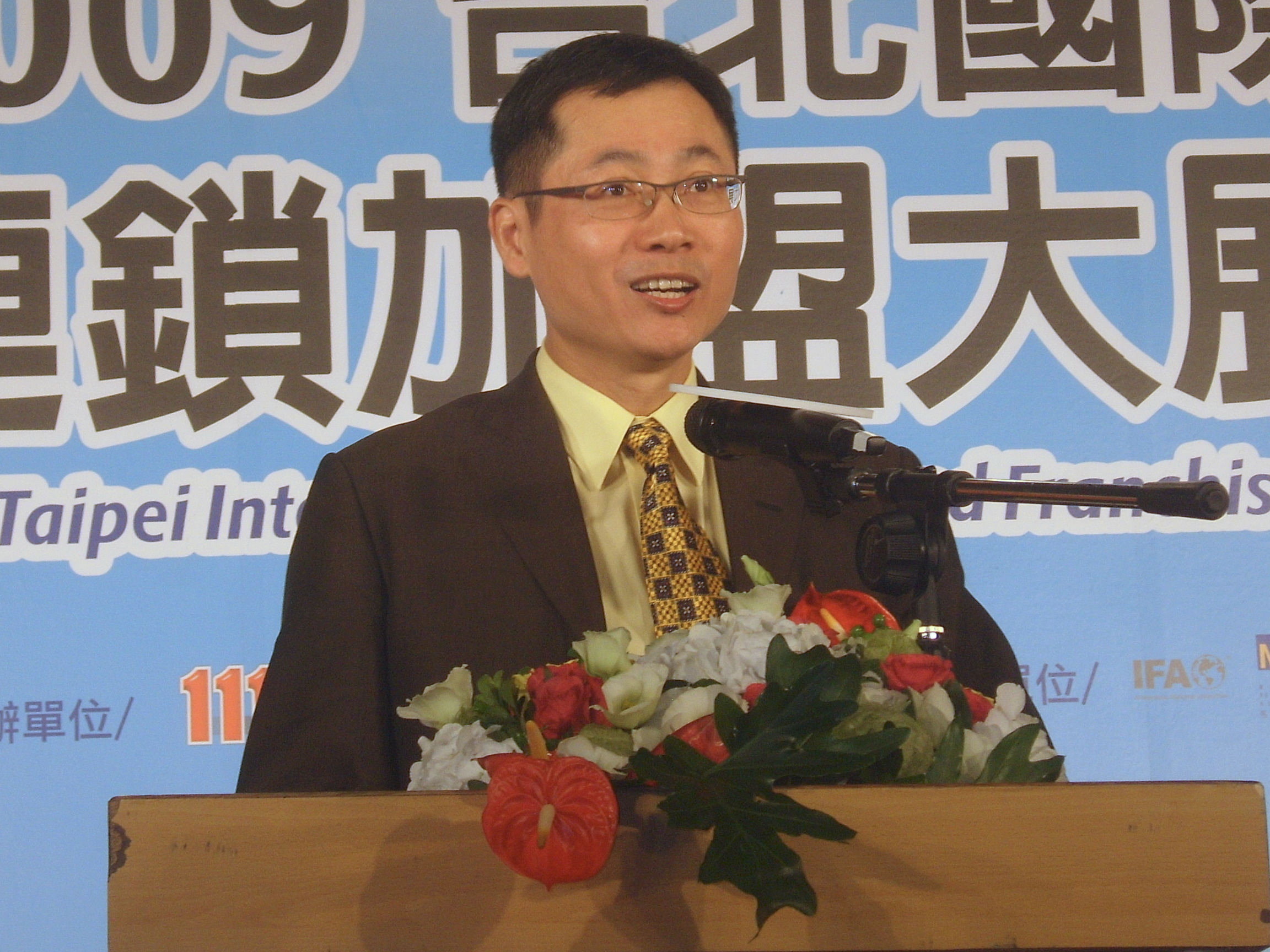
- Lai in July 2009

Vice Minister of the Council of Labor Affairs
- In office 8 June 2004 – December 2005
- Minister: Chen Chu; Lee Ying-yuan

Member of the Legislative Yuan
- In office 1 February 1999 – 8 June 2004
- Constituency: Taipei County 3

Member of the National Assembly
- In office 1 February 1992 – 31 January 1999

Personal details
- Born: 27 January 1962 (age 64) Yunlin, Taiwan
- Party: Democratic Progressive Party
- Children: Lai Pin-yu (daughter)
- Education: National Taiwan University (BA)

Lai Chin-lin (Chinese: 賴勁麟; born 27 January 1962) is a Taiwanese politician. He was elected to the National Assembly in 1991 and served until 1999, when he took office as a member of the Legislative Yuan. He left the Legislative Yuan in 2004 and became vice minister of the Council of Labor Affairs.

== Education ==
Lai earned a bachelor's degree in political science from National Taiwan University, where he met Liu Yi-te and Lee Wen-chung. The trio advocated for direct elections for student body president and the end of censorship in school publications, forming a student association that was later suspended by administrators. After graduating from NTU, Lai contributed to the labor and tangwai movements.

== Political career ==
In interviews, Lin credited the end of official relations between Taiwan and the United States and the Kaohsiung Incident, both of which occurred in 1979, for increasing his interest in politics. Lee was elected to the National Assembly twice in 1991 and 1996, representing the Democratic Progressive Party. He subsequently ran for a seat on the Legislative Yuan in 1998, and won. During his first term on the Legislative Yuan, Lai took an active role in proposing relief measures following the 1999 Jiji earthquake, and called for attention to the mental health of earthquake survivors. While serving on the Legislative Yuan, Lai was also president of the Taiwan Children's Rights Association. As a lawmaker and president of the association, he pushed the Executive Yuan to report on children's rights, child abuse, and child welfare.

Lai frequently supported a range of environmental causes, and was known for his opposition to nuclear energy. Lai often spoke out against the Longmen Nuclear Power Plant project. In 2000, Lai co-authored a report advising against the use of nuclear energy, and, later that year, discussed with American scientists the risks of nuclear technology.

Lai was nominated for a second term on the Legislative Yuan in 2001, and won reelection as a DPP candidate. In 2002, Lai co-founded the Taiwan Renewable Energy Industry Promotion Association to advocate for use and research into sources of renewable energy. During Lai's second term, Lai helped write the Mass Layoff Protection Law. He also supported stronger ties between Liberia and Taiwan. Lai ended his 2004 legislative campaign during the party primary stage, and in June was named vice minister of the Council of Labor Affairs, where he served through the end of 2005.

== Personal life ==
Lai was a board member of several energy companies. He resigned from his position as chair of J&V Energy in August 2023.

His daughter is Lai Pin-yu.
