= Battlefields of Asura =

Studio album by ChthoniC
- Released: October 12, 2018
- Genres: Melodic black metal, symphonic black metal
- Length: 40:02
- Labels: Ciongzo Idea Corporation (TW); Howling Bull (JP)

ChthoniC chronology
Bu-Tik (2013)	Battlefields of Asura (2018)

Battlefields of Asura is the eighth studio album from Taiwanese melodic death metal band Chthonic. It was released on October 12, 2018, in North America. The album features guest vocals from Randy Blythe and Denise Ho.

== Reception ==
Professional ratings
Review scores
Source	Rating
Consequence of Sound	B
Exclaim!	6/10
Metal Injection	9/10
Metal Storm	9.2/10

== Track listing ==
Battlefields of Asura album track listing adapted from Allmusic.

No.	Title	Length
1.	"Drawing Omnipotence Nigh" (Intro)	2:07
2.	"The Silent One's Torch"	4:03
3.	"Flames Upon the Weeping Winds"	3:10
4.	"A Crimson Sky's Command"	3:31
5.	"Souls of the Revolution" (feat. Randy Blythe)	4:39
6.	"Taste the Black Tears"	4:49
7.	"One Thousand Eyes"	5:16
8.	"Masked Faith"	2:19
9.	"Carved in Bloodstone"	2:57
10.	"Millennia's Faith Undone" (feat. Denise Ho)	5:06
11.	"Autopoiesis" (Outro)	2:05
Total length:		40:02

== Personnel ==
Battlefields of Asura album personnel adapted from Allmusic.

Chthonic

- Freddy Lim, "Left Face of Maradou" – vocals, composer
- Jesse Liu, "the Infernal" – guitar
- Doris Yeh, "Thunder Tears" – bass
- Dani Wang, "Azathothian Hands" – drums
- CJ Kao, "Dispersed Fingers" – keyboards, synthesizer
