= Satan's Horns =

EP by ChthoniC
- Released: December 2003
- Recorded: Prussian Blue Studio, Taichung.
- Genre: Blackened death metal, symphonic black metal
- Length: 14:23
- Language: Chinese, English
- Label: TRA Music
- Producer: ChthoniC

ChthoniC chronology
Relentless Recurrence (2002)	Satan's Horns (2003)	Seediq Bale (2006)

Satan's Horns is an EP by Taiwanese extreme metal band ChthoniC. It served as the promotional song and video to the Taiwanese release of the film Freddy vs. Jason.

== Track listing ==
No.	Title	Length
1.	"Satan's Horns"	5:31
2.	"Satan's Horns" (IDM Remix)	5:31
3.	"Satan's Horns" (Karaoke Version)	5:31

Multimedia bonus tracks
No.	Title	Length
4.	"Satan's Horns" (Music Video)
5.	"Freddy vs. Jason Trailer"

== Credits ==
- Freddy Lim – vocals
- Jesse Liu – guitar
- A-Jay – drums
- Doris Yeh – bass guitar
- Luis – piano/synthesizer
