= Lee Wen-chung =

Taiwanese politician (born 1958)

- 李文忠
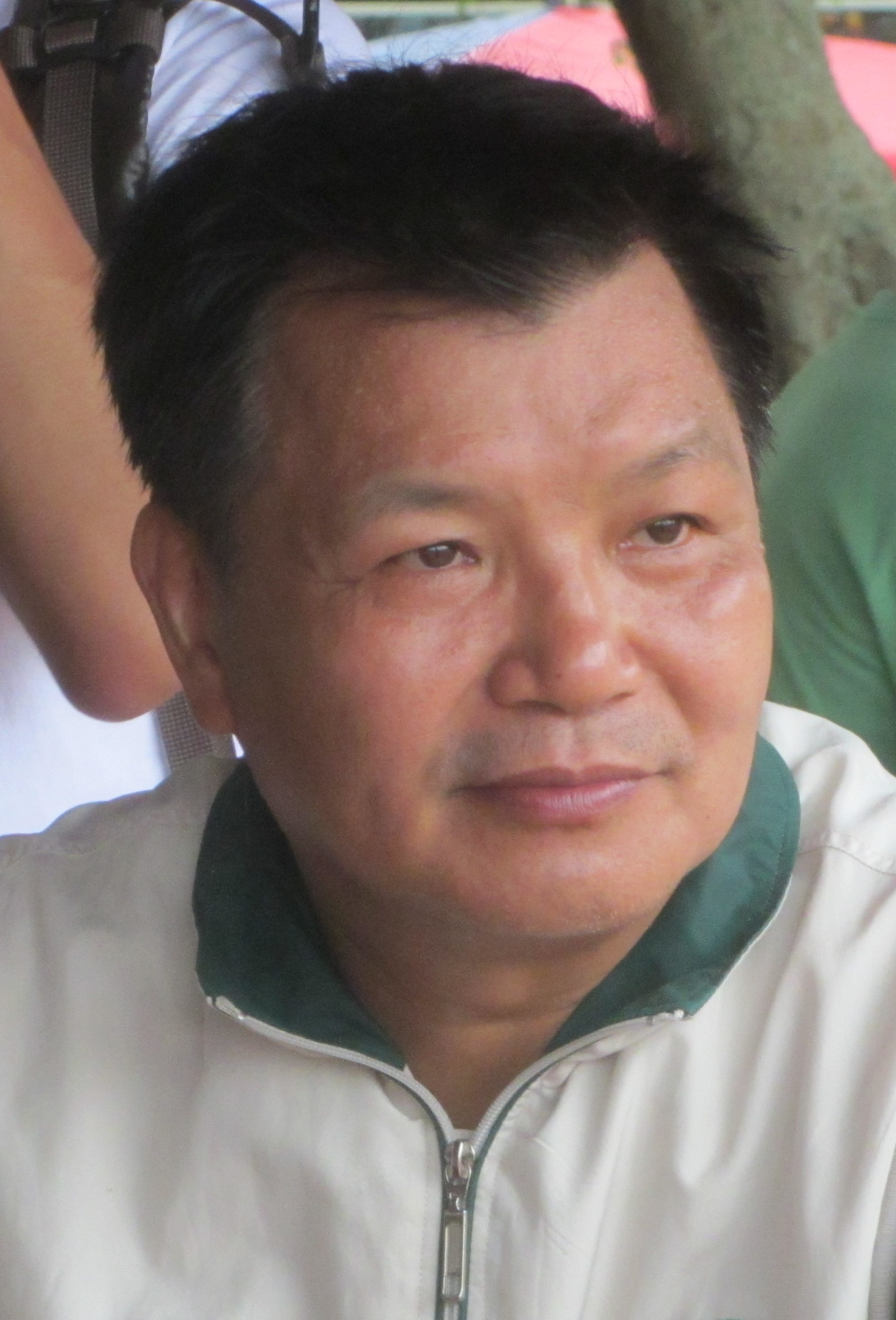
- Lee in July 2014

Minister of Veterans Affairs
- Acting; 24 July 2019 – 4 August 2019
- Prime Minister: Su Tseng-chang
- Preceded by: Chiu Kuo-cheng
- Succeeded by: Feng Shih-kuan

Deputy Minister of Veterans Affairs
- In office 20 May 2016 – 20 May 2024
- Minister: Lee Shying-jow; Chiu Kuo-cheng; Himself (acting); Feng Shih-kuan

Member of the Legislative Yuan
- In office 1 February 1999 – 15 November 2006
- Constituency: Taipei County 1

Member of the National Assembly
- In office 1 February 1992 – 31 January 1999

Personal details
- Born: 20 June 1958 (age 68) Nantou County, Taiwan
- Party: Democratic Progressive Party
- Spouse: Chen De-yu (陳德愉)
- Education: National Taiwan University (BA)

Lee Wen-chung (Chinese: 李文忠; born 20 June 1958) is a Taiwanese politician who served in the National Assembly from 1992 to 1999, then in the Legislative Yuan until his resignation in 2006.

== Early life and education ==
Lee was born to a poor Nantou County family in 1958, and attended National Taiwan University, where he studied political science. Heavily influenced by the 1979 Kaohsiung Incident, he edited tangwai publications and pushed for the school to permit direct elections for student body president alongside Liu Yi-te and Lai Chin-lin. University administration labelled Lee "excessively politically progressive" instead and expelled him in 1986, after which he became active in Taiwan's labor rights movement. Lee was also active in the Wild Lily student movement of 1990.

== Political career ==
Within the Democratic Progressive Party, Lee is allied with the New Tide faction. Elected to the National Assembly in 1991 and again in 1996, Lee launched his first campaign for a seat on the Legislative Yuan in 1998. Shortly after the 1999 Jiji earthquake, Lee proposed a number of bills intended to aid rescue efforts. In his first term, Lee helped uncover a financial scandal involving Taiwan Pineapple Group and members of the Taiwanese judiciary dating back to November 1999. That month, Lee and Michael Tsai were charged with libel by fellow legislator Lo Fu-chu. The pair had accused Lo of interference in a Yunlin County by-election in favor of Chang Jung-wei. For a portion of his first term in the Legislative Yuan, Lee served as DPP caucus convenor.

He won reelection to the legislature in 2001. In 2004, an essay written by Lee titled New Culture Discourse was leaked. In it, Lee advocated keeping the Republic of China as Taiwan's official name, stating "there will be no suitable environment in the next two or three decades for the Republic of China (ROC) to change its national name." Reasons given for retaining the Republic of China included acceptance of the term by Taiwan's citizens of both Hoklo and Mainlander descent. In addition, retention of the name was seen to appease the People's Republic of China. Lee spent the end of his second legislative term advocating that the government acquire extensive military equipment. After winning reelection in December 2004, he continued arguing for military upgrades. Lee was criticized by the Democratic Progressive Party in 2005 when he proposed that the party revoke its support of Taiwanese independence and form a coalition with the People First Party. Lee and Lin Cho-shui resigned their legislative seats in November 2006 to protest the way a party-led investigation into Chen Shui-bian was being run.

Despite his resignation, Lee declared his candidacy for the 2008 legislative election cycle. He next represented the Democratic Progressive Party in the 2009 Nantou County magistracy election. During his campaign, Lee accused Kuomintang candidate Lee Chao-ching of working with Chiang Chin-liang, a convicted felon. When DPP member Huang Wen-chun alleged that Lee Wen-chung had also sought the support of Chiang, the party moved to expel Huang. Lee later became director of the party's Department of Organization. He launched his second campaign for the Nantou County magistracy in June 2013 and was formally confirmed as DPP candidate in November. Lee lost to Lin Ming-chen, and was named deputy minister of the Veterans Affairs Council in 2016.

=== Political stances ===
Lee's writings for the Taipei Times have extensively covered military affairs and national defense. He has also been critical of Ma Ying-jeou and his economic and Cross-Strait policies.

== Personal life ==
Lee is married to Chen De-yu.
