= Lai Pin-yu =

Taiwanese politician and cosplayer

Lai Pin-yu MLY
- 賴品妤
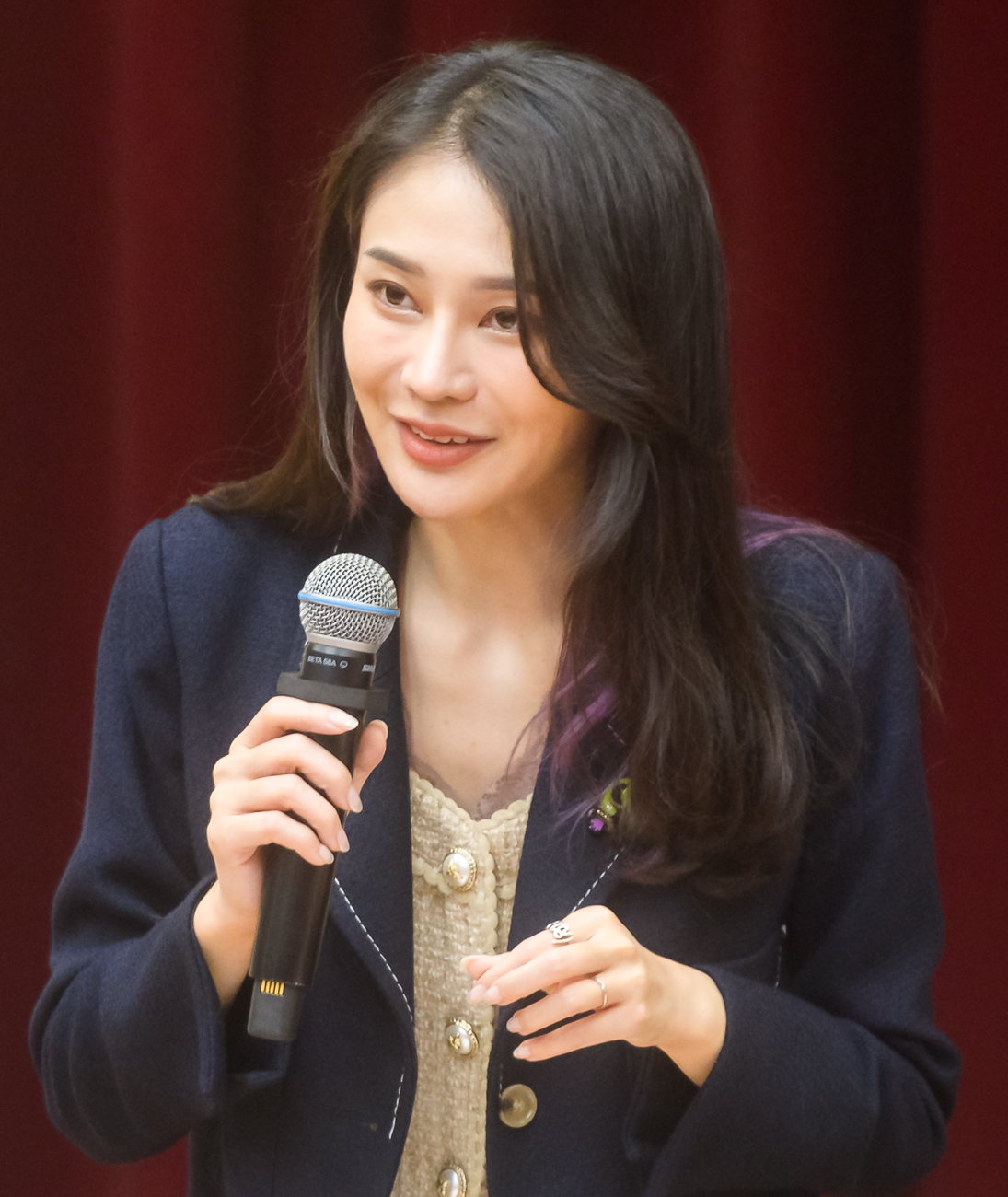
- Lai in 2023

Member of the Legislative Yuan
- In office 1 February 2020 – 31 January 2024
- Preceded by: Huang Kuo-chang
- Succeeded by: Liao Hsien-hsiang
- Constituency: New Taipei XII

Personal details
- Born: 2 March 1992 (age 34) Taipei County, Taiwan
- Party: Democratic Progressive Party
- Parent: Lai Chin-lin (father)
- Education: National Taipei University (LLB)
- Profession: Politician, cosplayer

Lai Pin-yu (Chinese: 賴品妤; pinyin: Lài Pǐnyú; born 2 March 1992) is a Taiwanese politician and lawyer of the Democratic Progressive Party who was elected to the Legislative Yuan in 2020. She is also a cosplayer.

== Education and early activism ==
Lai was born on 2 March 1992 in Zhonghe, Taipei County, Taiwan. She is the daughter of the Democratic Progressive Party politician Lai Chin-lin and his wife Wu Ju-ping (吳如萍), a media worker.

Lai obtained her bachelor's degree in law from National Taipei University in 2013. After the appearance of the white shirt army movement and anti-media monopoly movement in 2012 caused by the death of Hung Chung-chiu, Lai began to participate in many social movements in person.

During Chen Deming's 26 November 2013 visit with Chairman of Straits Exchange Foundation Lin Join-sane, more than 20 students from the Black Island Youth Front, dissatisfied with Chen's pressure on the Cross-Strait Service Trade Agreement, planned to hold a placard to protest near the foundation headquarters. They immediately clashed with the police there; Lai was surrounded alongside two other female students by ten female police officers, and was dragged by the police all the way to the headquarters before letting go. In an interview on the same day, she said that the effects of relative cheapness of Chinese labor and the easing of environmental laws will cause Taiwan's industry to stagnate the salary level of Taiwan's labor in comparison with mainland China.

Since Lai Pin-yu is an anime fan herself and also likes selfies and cosplay, she received a lot of followers on Facebook. In the demolition of the Huaguang community triggered by the Urban Planning Commission, Taipei City Government in December 2013, Lai Pin-yu decided to combine the issue of destruction with cosplay, and cosplay as Rei Ayanami, a character in the Neon Genesis Evangelion franchise, in the hopes that the image work left by taking pictures of the architectural remains of the Huaguang community will attract more attention. In January 2014, during the Taiwan high school curriculum fine-tuning controversy, she pointed out that in the new draft syllabus proposed by the Ministry of Education, only the 1943 Cairo Declaration is mentioned in the process of determining the status of international law, but it downplays the content of the Treaty of San Francisco and the Taiwan Relations Act enacted by the 96th United States Congress.

Lai participated in Sunflower Student Movement in 2014 where she was arrested for blocking traffic with other protesters.

== Political career ==
Lai entered politics in September 2019 when she became a Democratic Progressive Party candidate for the Legislative Yuan in the 2020 Taiwanese legislative election. As a cosplayer, Lai was seen dressed up as Asuka Langley Soryu from the Japanese Neon Genesis Evangelion anime franchise and Sailor Mars from the Sailor Moon franchise in her campaign advertisement. On 11 January 2020, Lai won the election to become the member of Legislative Yuan representing New Taipei City Constituency XII. She was the youngest member of the 10th Legislative Yuan. Similarly, in 2022, Lai cosplayed as Yor Forger from Spy × Family. Lai ran for re-election in 2024, losing against Liao Hsien-hsiang.
