= Yu Tian =

Taiwanese singer and politician (born 1947)

Yu Tian MLY
- 余天
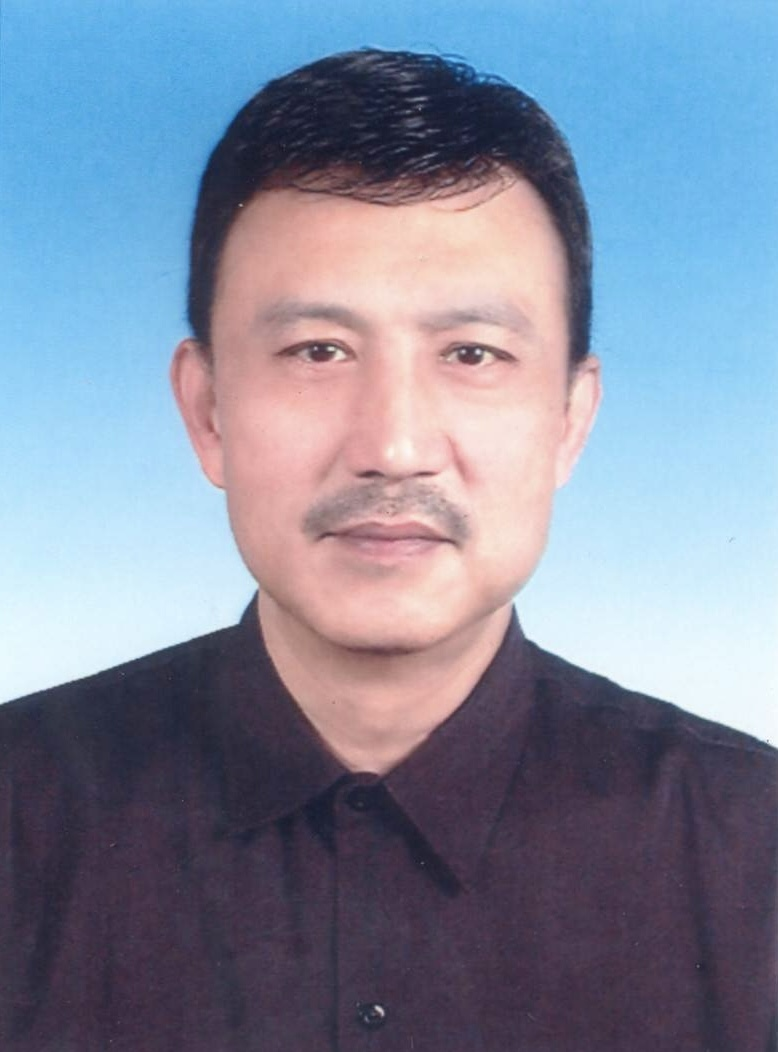
- Official portrait, 2008

National Policy Adviser to the President
- Incumbent
- Assumed office 1 August 2024
- President: Lai Ching-te

Member of the Legislative Yuan
- In office 21 March 2019 – 31 January 2024
- Preceded by: Gao Jyh-peng
- Succeeded by: Lee Kuen-chen
- Constituency: New Taipei 3
- In office 1 February 2008 – 31 January 2012
- Preceded by: Chu Chun-hsiao
- Succeeded by: Gao Jyh-peng
- Constituency: New Taipei 3

3rd Head of the New Taipei Branch of the Democratic Progressive Party
- In office 1 June 2016 – 10 July 2020
- Chairperson: Tsai Ing-wen; Lin Yu-chang (acting); Cho Jung-tai
- Preceded by: Lo Chih-cheng
- Succeeded by: Ho Po-wen

Personal details
- Born: 18 February 1947 (age 79) Hsinchu, Taiwan
- Party: Democratic Progressive Party
- Spouse: Lee Ya-ping
- Children: 3 (1 deceased)
- Occupation: Politician
- Profession: Singer

Yu Tian (Chinese: 余天; pinyin: Yú Tiān; Pe̍h-ōe-jī: Û Thian; born 18 February 1947), born Yu Tsing-yuan (Chinese: 余清源; pinyin: Yú Qīngyuán; Pe̍h-ōe-jī: Û Chheng-goân), is a Taiwanese politician and pop singer in Mandarin and Hokkien. A member of the Democratic Progressive Party, Yu currently serves as a member of the Legislative Yuan and previously held the same seat from 2008 to 2012.

== Early life and education ==
Born in Hsinchu, Yu Tian graduated from Hsinchu Chien Hua Junior High School.

== Music career ==
Yu is best known for his 1977 release "Under the Banyan Tree", a Mandarin cover version of the Japanese song Kitaguni no haru, and remained popular throughout the 1980s. In 2003, Yu founded the Taiwan Cultural Entertainment Development Association. Four years later, he launched a Kaohsiung-based entertainment labor union. Yu worked with Chthonic on the 2011 album Takasago Army and formally announced a return to the entertainment industry upon losing the 2012 legislative elections.

== Political career ==
Within the Democratic Progressive Party, Yu Tian is allied with Yu Shyi-kun. He is also known for his support of former president Chen Shui-bian. Yu ran for New Taipei 3 in 2008, and defeated Kuomintang incumbent Chu Chun-hsiao by approximately 2,000 votes. Chu filed an unsuccessful lawsuit in an attempt to annul the election results. A separate case was brought against Yu supporter Wang Ying-lan, who was charged with making threats to the opposition. Wang was later released on bail. In November 2008, Yu and other DPP politicians publicly protested Ma Ying-jeou's meeting with Association for Relations Across the Taiwan Strait Chairman Chen Yunlin. The next year, Yu's DPP membership was suspended because he had failed to fulfill a fundraising quota. In 2010, Yu was named to Tsai Ing-wen's New Taipei mayoral campaign team.

Though there was speculation that Yu would not receive DPP backing in a reelection bid, Yu was listed fourteenth on the Democratic Progressive Party's proportional representation party list, and expected to win. During the campaign, Kuomintang politicians accused Yu and others of gambling, and in response, Yu charged them with defamation.

The Taiwan Competitiveness Forum regarded Yu Tian as a controversial figure prior to the start of his first legislative term. During his first term, Yu was ranked highly by the Citizen Congress Watch.

In 2018, Yu was the only candidate to run in elections for the DPP chapter leadership in New Taipei. After Gao Jyh-peng was removed from office, Yu Tian was named the DPP candidate for by-elections held in March 2019. Yu won 56,888 votes, and defeated Kuomintang candidate Cheng Shih-wei as well as independent Su Ching-yen. Yu took office on 21 March 2019. Yu was reelected to a full term in 2020.

== Personal life ==
Yu is married to fellow entertainer Lee Ya-ping. Yu and Lee have two daughters, Yu Shiao-ping and Yu Yuan-chi, and one son, Ken Yu. His family was the target of extortion by the Bamboo Union in 2005.

Yu Tian's adopted younger brother was sentenced to death by Chinese authorities for attempting to smuggle heroin into the country in March 2005.

Yu Tian's second daughter, Yu Yuan-chi, died with a late stage of rectal cancer at Taipei Veterans General Hospital on 21 August 2022, aged 39.
