= Tsai Chun-chou =

Taiwanese politician (born 1960)

Tsai Chun-chou MLY
- 蔡春綢
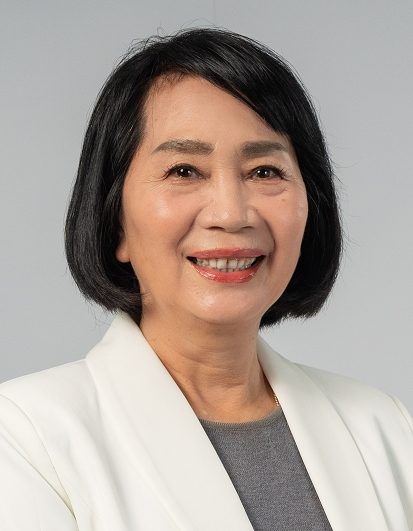
- Official portrait, 2026

Member of the Legislative Yuan
- Incumbent
- Assumed office 3 February 2026
- Preceded by: Huang Kuo-chang
- Constituency: Republic of China

Personal details
- Born: 13 January 1960 (age 66)
- Party: Taiwan People's Party
- Education: National Taiwan Normal University (BEd)

Tsai Chun-chou (Chinese: 蔡春綢; born 13 January 1960) is a Taiwanese politician.

Tsai was a student of National Taiwan Normal University's Department of Physical Education. Prior to seeking political office, Tsai chaired the Chinese Sunshine Promotion and Care Association.

Six members of the Legislative Yuan affiliated with the Taiwan People's Party resigned on 1 February 2026, and Tsai assumed the seat vacated by Huang Kuo-chang on 3 February 2026.
