= Huang Kuo-chang =

Taiwanese legal scholar and politician (born 1973)

Huang Kuo-chang MLY
- 黃國昌
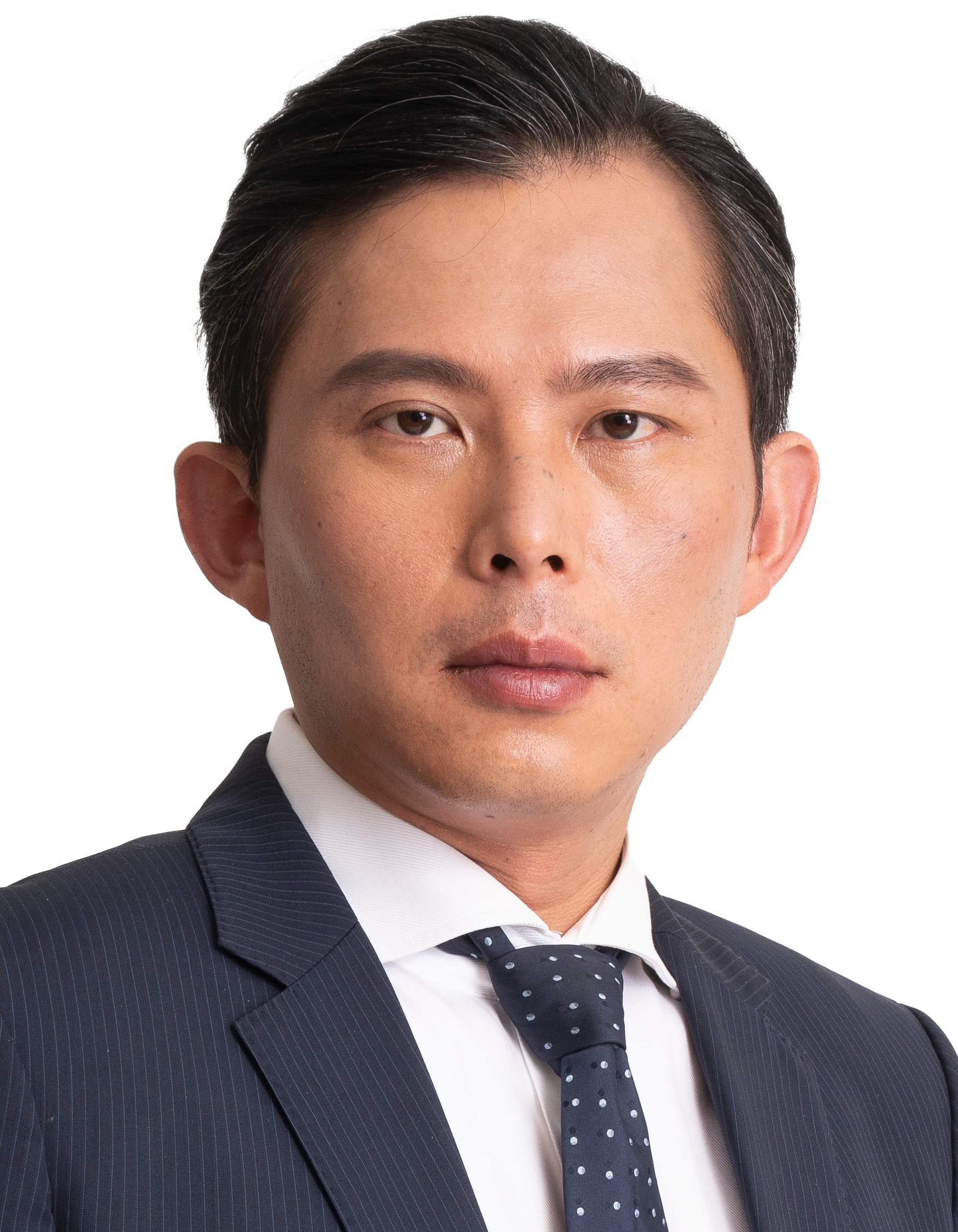
- Official portrait, 2024

2nd Chairman of the Taiwan People's Party
- Incumbent
- Assumed office 1 January 2025 (Note: As a co-convener of the Central Emergency Response Council from 29 August 2024 to 1 January 2025 during Ko's suspension as the party's chair; serving with Lin Fu-nan and Lee Wei-hua.); Acting: 1 January 2025 – 19 February 2025
- Preceded by: Ko Wen-je

Member of the Legislative Yuan
- In office 1 February 2024 – 1 February 2026
- Succeeded by: Tsai Chun-chou
- Constituency: Party-list (TPP)
- In office 1 February 2016 – 31 January 2020
- Preceded by: Lee Ching-hua
- Succeeded by: Lai Pin-yu
- Constituency: New Taipei XII

2nd Leader of the New Power Party
- In office 2 July 2015 – 1 March 2019 (Note: Titled as captain until 12 September 2016)
- Preceded by: Freddy Lim
- Succeeded by: Chiu Hsien-chih
Parliamentary offices
3rd Leader of the Taiwan People's Party Caucus in Legislative Yuan
In office 1 February 2024 – 1 February 2024
Deputy	Huang Shan-shan; Wu Chun-cheng; Chang Chi-kai
Preceded by	Andy Chiu
Succeeded by	Jacky Chen
2nd Leader of the New Power Party Caucus in Legislative Yuan
In office 10 September 2019 – 1 January 2020
Preceded by	Hsu Yung-ming
Succeeded by	Chiu Hsien-chih

Personal details
- Born: 19 August 1973 (age 53) Xizhi, Taipei County, Taiwan
- Party: Taiwan People's Party (after 2023); New Power Party (until 2023)
- Education: National Taiwan University (LLB); Cornell University (LLM, JSD)

YouTube information
- Channel: 黃國昌
- Years active: 2017–present
- Subscribers: 575 thousand
- Views: 199 million
- Last updated: 19 November 2025

Huang Kuo-chang (Chinese: 黃國昌; pinyin: Huáng Guóchāng; Pe̍h-ōe-jī: N̂g Kok-chhiong; born 19 August 1973) is a Taiwanese legal scholar and politician who has served as the chairman of the Taiwan People’s Party (TPP) since 2025. He was a member of the Legislative Yuan for two terms, first representing New Taipei City's 12th constituency from 2016 to 2020, then serving as a TPP party-list legislator from 2024 to 2026.

After graduating from National Taiwan University in 1995, Huang earned his doctorate in law from Cornell University in 2002 and became a legal academic at Academia Sinica. He gained national attention as one of the leading activists in the 2014 Sunflower Student Movement, after which he became the chairman of the newly-formed New Power Party (NPP) in 2015, and was elected to the Legislative Yuan as a member of the NPP in 2016.

In 2023, Huang left the NPP and joined the Taiwan People's Party, which had been formed by Ko Wen-je in 2019. He won election for a second term in the Legislative Yuan in 2024 and assumed the party's chairmanship after Ko was detained on corruption charges. In accordance with party rules, he resigned from the legislature in February 2026.

== Early life and education ==
Huang was born on August 19, 1973, in Xizhi Township, Taipei County, to a working-class family. His grandfather and father were both farmers, and his mother was an incense and candle vendor. As a high school student, Huang initially studied science to pursue a career in medicine, but decided to switch to law instead. He graduated first in his class from Taipei Municipal Chien Kuo High School.

After high school, Huang studied law at National Taiwan University, where he was elected student council president in his sophomore year. He graduated with a Bachelor of Laws (LL.B.) in 1995, then pursued graduate studies in the United States at Cornell University, where he earned a Master of Laws (LL.M.) and a Doctor of Juridical Science (J.S.D.) in 2002 from Cornell Law School. His doctoral dissertation, completed under law professors Kevin M. Clermont, Theodore Eisenberg, and Jeffrey Rachlinski, was titled, "Introducing discovery into continental civil procedure".

Before receiving his doctorate, Huang was admitted to the New York State Bar Association in 1999. He was also the Rudolf B. Schlesinger Fellow at Cornell Law School from 1999 to 2000, a legal researcher at the University of Tokyo from 2000 to 2001, and a visiting scholar at Cornell from 2001 to 2002.

== Academic career ==
After receiving his doctorate, Huang returned to Taiwan and became an associate professor of law at the National University of Kaohsiung, where he taught from August 2002 to August 2006. He left the university to become an assistant research fellow at the Institute of Jurisprudence at Academia Sinica, beginning on March 11, 2010.

From 2012 to 2013, Huang was a visiting scholar of law at Cornell University under law professor Theodore Eisenberg on a Fulbright Fellowship. His research primarily focused on labor-dispute settlement, the effects of changes to the Taiwan Supreme Court's jurisdiction, and the relationship between litigant resources and appellate outcomes. As of 2026, Huang is a member of Cornell's Journal of Empirical Legal Studies.

Academia Sinica promoted Huang to a full research fellow at its Institute of Jurisprudence on November 18, 2014. On July 27, 2015, after announcing his candidacy for the Legislative Yuan, Huang announced that he would relinquish his tenured position and resign from Academia Sinica.

== Sunflower Student Movement leader ==
Huang in June 2014, discussing the Wang–Zhang meetings

In March 2014, while still a research fellow at Academia Sinica, Huang, alongside Lin Fei-fan and Chen Wei-ting, became one of the most popular spokespersons of the Sunflower Student Movement, which opposed the handling of the Cross-Strait Service Trade Agreement (CSSTA) by the Kuomintang government. On March 19 of that year, following the occupation of the Legislative Yuan by protesters the previous day, Huang led protesters in presenting demands that included returning the CSSTA for review, an apology from President Ma Ying-jeou, and the resignation of Premier Jiang Yi-huah.

Huang campaigning in Taichung for reform of the Referendum Act, July 2014

On March 26, 2014, Huang met privately with Hsiao Hsu-tsen (蕭旭岑), the deputy secretary-general of the Office of the President. Huang subsequently said that he had told Hsiao that the movement was not affiliated with the Democratic Progressive Party, that the CSSTA should not be reviewed until a legislative monitoring mechanism for cross-strait agreements could be established, and that Ma should apologize for the police crackdown on protesters who entered the Executive Yuan compound on March 23. Disclosure of the meeting caused controversy among protesters because Huang had not informed Lin or Chen about it beforehand.

After the occupation ended on April 10, 2014, Huang and seven student activists voluntarily appeared at the Taipei District Prosecutors' Office on April 21 to be questioned about events during the movement. On February 10, 2015, Taipei prosecutors indicted Huang and other movement participants on charges arising from the protests; Huang was among 22 defendants prosecuted in connection with the March 18 occupation of the Legislative Yuan. The Taipei District Court acquitted Huang and the other 21 defendants on March 31, 2017, finding that Huang's statements did not constitute incitement and that the defendants' actions satisfied the court's criteria for civil disobedience. On March 13, 2018, the Taiwan High Court upheld the acquittals, rejecting the prosecution's contention that Huang and the other defendants had incited criminal conduct; Huang was among 13 defendants whose acquittals became final at that stage.

== Legislative Yuan ==
=== 9th Legislative Yuan ===
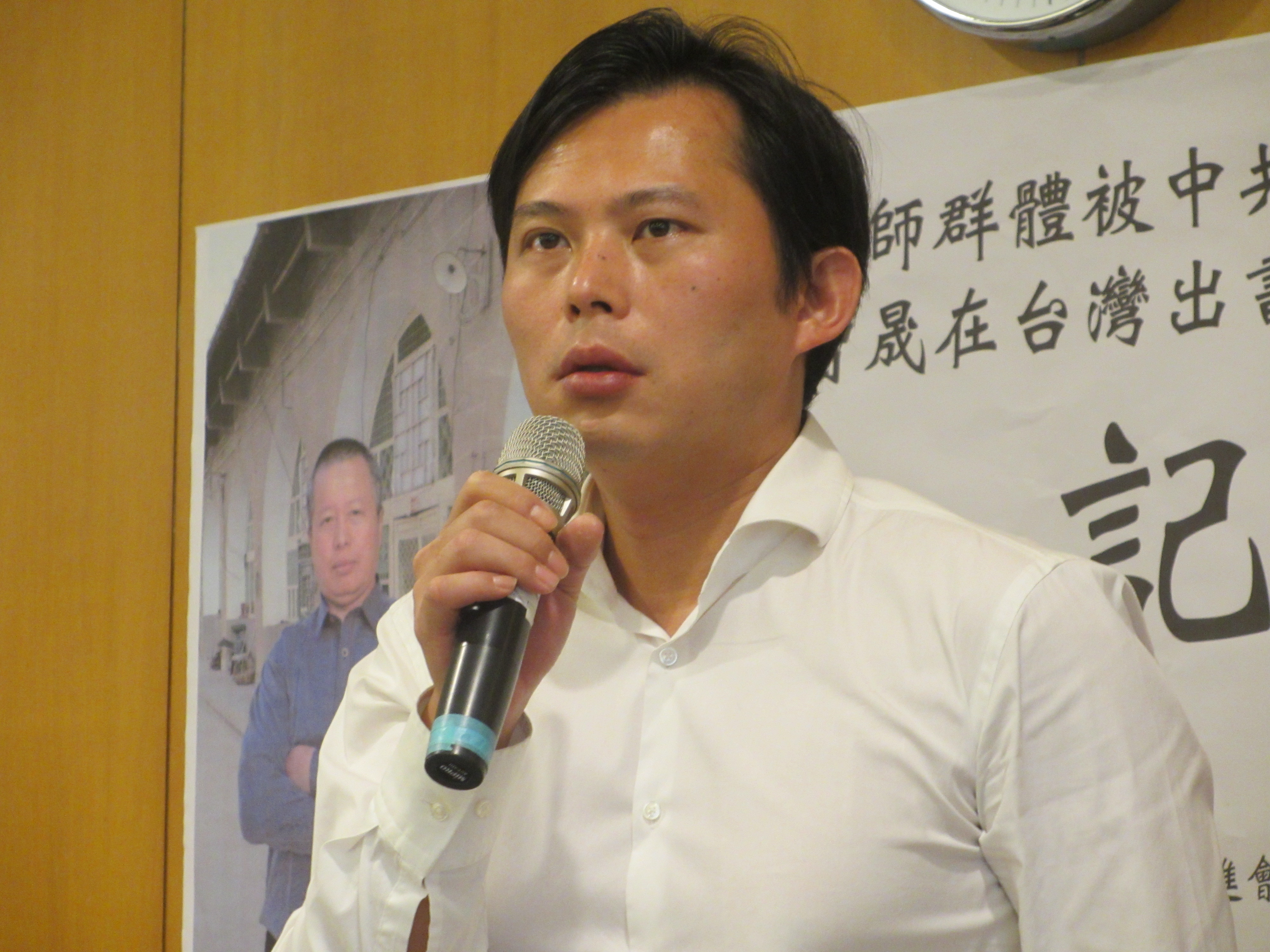
Huang in 2016

In May 2015, Huang joined the New Power Party (NPP). In July 2015, he was named the party's acting chairperson and subsequently served on a seven-member committee of party leaders, including Freddy Lim and Neil Peng. On July 27, 2015, he announced his bid to run for office in the Legislative Yuan. He ran as the NPP's candidate in the 2016 legislative election for New Taipei City Constituency 12 and defeated incumbent Kuomintang legislator Lee Ching-hua. He took office in the 9th Legislative Yuan on February 1, 2016.

As a legislator, Huang's support for same-sex marriage contributed to a campaign to recall him from office in 2017. Huang said at the time that he respected the exercise of recall rights but would not change his position on marriage equality. On December 16, 2017, 48,693 voters supported his removal and 21,748 opposed it, but the recall failed as the majority did not reach the legally required one-quarter threshold of registered voters in the constituency.

During the final session of the legislature in 2019, Huang served as NPP caucus convener. That year, he promoted legislation intended to counter Chinese political influence, including an NPP proposal requiring disclosure by individuals and organizations assisting infiltration by a hostile foreign entity. Huang did not seek re-election in his constituency in 2020 and instead ranked fourth on the NPP's party list; the party won only three proportional-representation seats, ending his tenure in the Legislative Yuan on January 31, 2020.

=== 11th Legislative Yuan ===
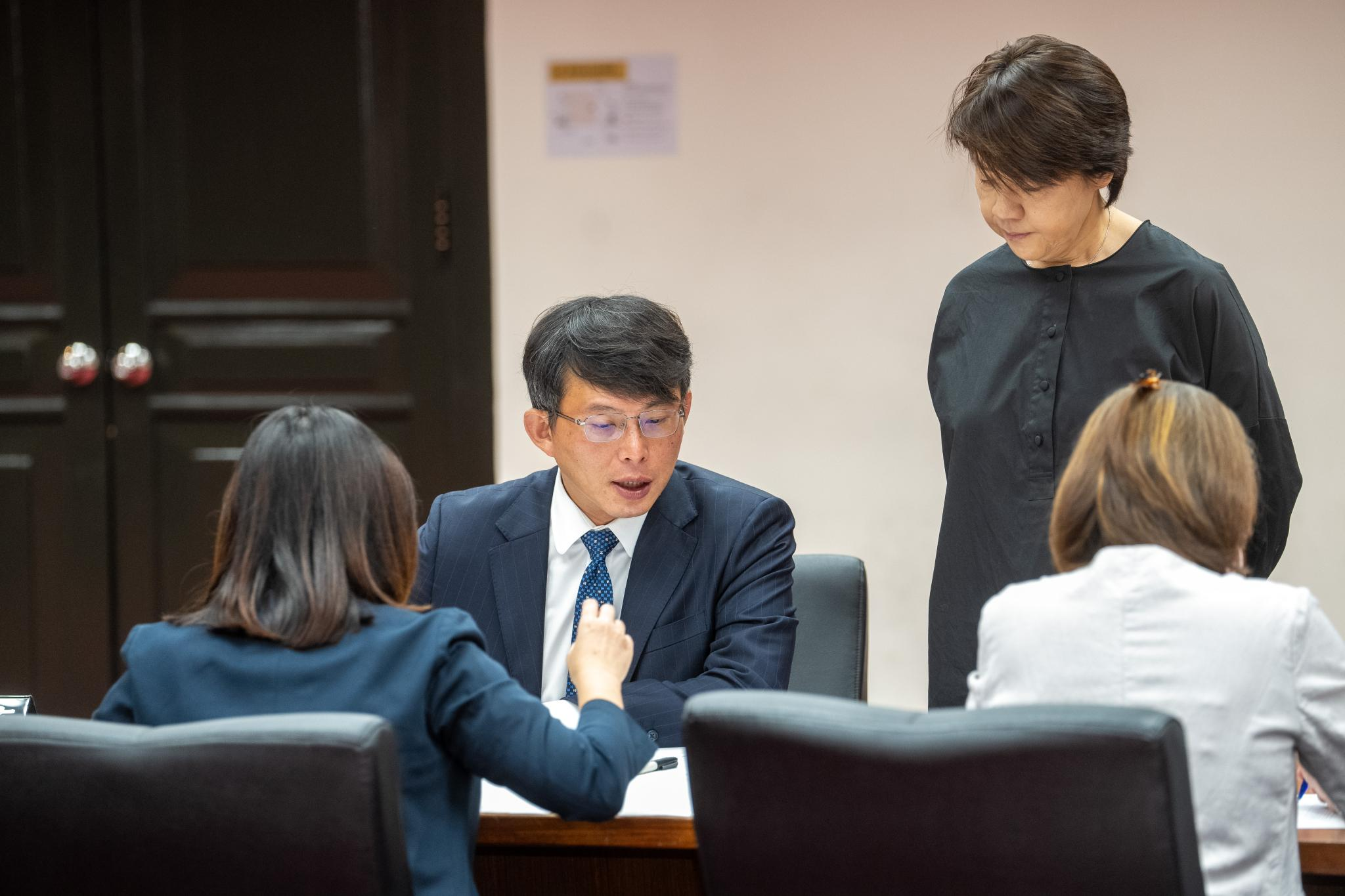
Huang in 2024, with Huang Shan-shan (right, standing)

On 16 November 2023, Huang announced that he had filed paperwork to join the Taiwan People's Party (TPP). He won a second term in the Legislative Yuan in 2024 as a TPP party-list legislator after the party won eight proportional-representation seats in the 2024 legislative election. Before the new legislature convened, the party's eight legislators selected him as caucus convener. Huang served on the Judiciary and Organic Laws and Statutes Committee and became a leading advocate of the TPP's 2024 legislative-powers reforms, which expanded the legislature's investigative and hearing powers and established penalties for certain forms of contempt of the legislature. After the legislation was challenged before the Constitutional Court, Huang represented the legislature in the proceedings and defended the reforms during oral arguments; the court later invalidated significant portions of the amendments.

Huang resigned from the Legislative Yuan on February 1, 2026, per the TPP's policy of rotating its party-list legislators after two years.

== Taiwan People's Party chairmanship ==
After Ko Wen-je resigned as chairman of the Taiwan People's Party (TPP) on January 1, 2025, amid his prosecution in the Core Pacific City and political-donations cases, the party's central committee selected Huang as acting chairman. Huang subsequently contested the party's chairmanship by-election against former legislator Tsai Pi-ru and won on February 15 with 8,903 votes, or 96.11 percent, to Tsai's 360 votes; his term runs through December 31, 2026.

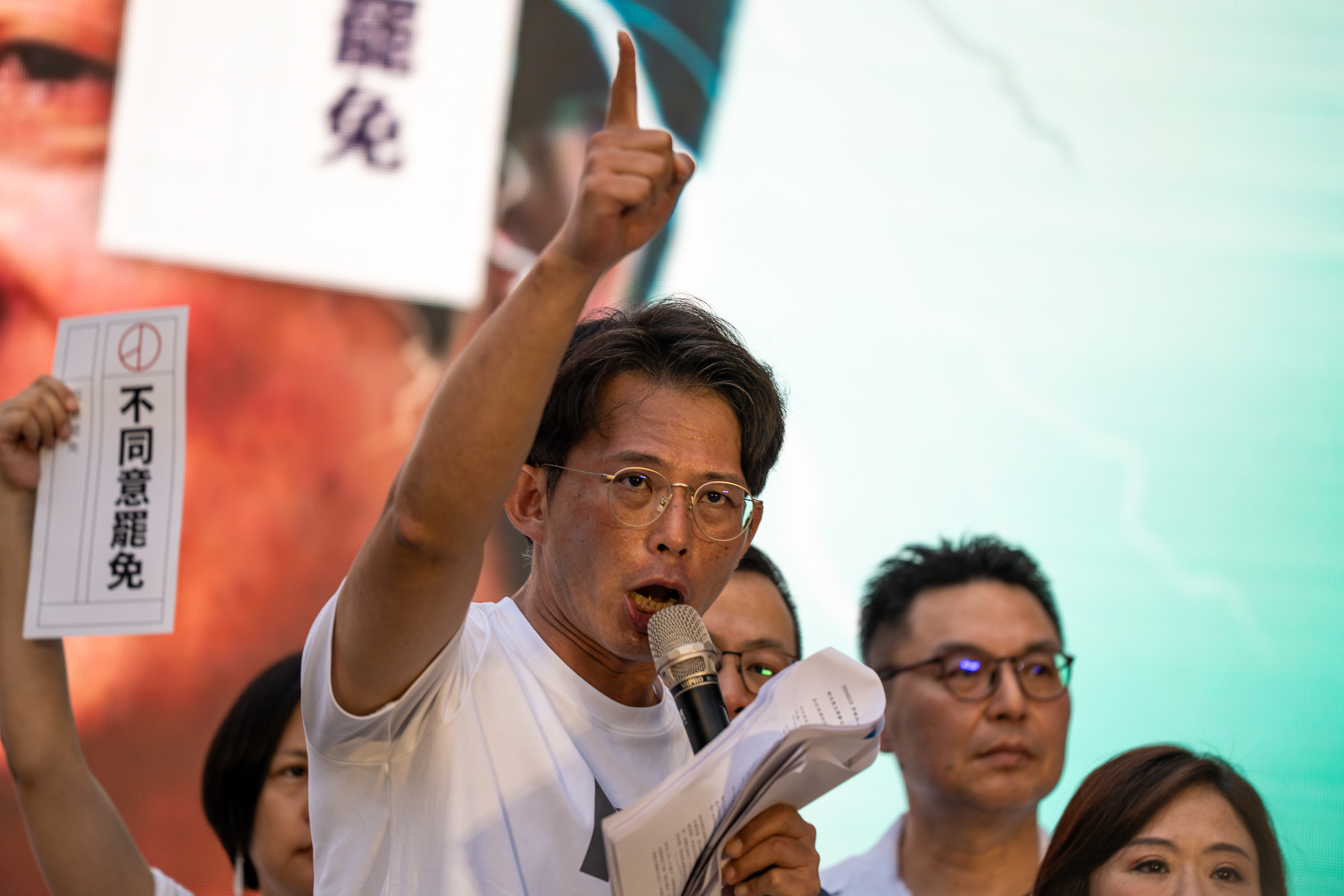
Huang in July 2025, leading a protest during the 2025 Taiwanese mass electoral recall campaigns

As chair, Huang campaigned alongside KMT politicians during the 2025 Taiwanese mass electoral recall campaigns, including appearing at rallies for targeted KMT legislators and urging voters to cast ballots against their removal. He continued to defend Ko during the Ko's criminal proceedings, characterizing the case against Ko as political persecution. In February 2026, he reorganized the party leadership, assuming the chairmanship of its policy committee while appointing Ko the president of the party's National Governance Institute. After the Taipei District Court sentenced Ko to 17 years' imprisonment in March 2026, Huang rejected the verdict as politically motivated and said that the party would neither require Ko to leave nor subject him to party discipline.

The TPP nominated Huang as its candidate for the mayor of New Taipei City in February 2026, while simultaneously negotiating electoral cooperation with the KMT. In March 2026, Huang and KMT chairwoman Cheng Li-wun announced common policy positions in social welfare, housing, environmental sustainability, and artificial-intelligence governance, and the two parties subsequently approved an electoral cooperation agreement providing for integration of competing mayoral candidates through public opinion polling. KMT nominee Lee Shu-chuan defeated Huang in the April polls, after which Huang pledged that he and the TPP would fully support Lee's New Taipei mayoral campaign. Disputes surrounding the TPP's nomination process for local offices subsequently contributed to several members leaving the party; in May 2026, Huang apologized to members and supporters for the internal turmoil.

== Publications ==
- Journal Articles
  - Kuo-Chang Huang, Kong-Pin Chen, Chang-Ching Lin, 2015, "Party Capability versus Court Preference: Why do the "Haves" Come Out Ahead?－An Empirical Lesson from the Taiwan Supreme Court", Journal of Law Economics & Organization, 31(1), 93–126. (SSCI) (IF: 1.036; SSCI ranking: 37.7%,30.5%)
  - Kuo-Chang Huang, Chang-Ching Lin, & Kong-Pin Chen, 2014, "Do Rich and Poor Behave Similarly in Seeking Legal Advice? Lessons from Taiwan in Comparative Perspective", Law & Society Review, 48(1), 193–223. (SSCI) (IF: 1.31; SSCI ranking: 22.1%,21.2%)
  - Kuo-Chang Huang & Chang-Ching Lin, 2014, "Mock Jury Trials in Taiwan—Paving theGround for Introducing Lay Participation", Law and Human Behavior, 38(4), 367–377. (SSCI) (IF: 2.153; SSCI ranking: 7.6%,16.7%)
- Book Chapters
  - Kuo-Chang Huang, accepted, "The Effect of Stakes on Settlement—An Empirical Lesson from Taiwan", editor(s): Theodore Eisenberg, Giovanni Battista Ramello EDS, Research Handbooks in Comparative Law and Economics, Cheltenham: Edward Elgar Publishing.
  - Kuo-Chang Huang, accepted, "Using Associations as a Vehicle for Class Action—The Case of Taiwan", editor(s): Deborah Hensler, Christ Hodge EDS, Class Action in Context, Cheltenham: Edward Elgar Publishing
- Conference Papers
  - Kuo-Chang Huang, 2014, "The Impacts of Judicial Reform in Taiwan", paper presented at 4th Brazilian Jurimetrics Conference, Brazil: Brazilian Jurimetrics Association, 2014-05-12 ~ 2014-05-16.

== Notes ==
Party political offices
Preceded by Freddy Lim	Leader of the New Power Party; 2015–2019	Succeeded by Chiu Hsien-chih
