= 9th Empyrean =

- Cover on Chinese Version

Studio album by Chthonic
- Released: May 8, 2000
- Recorded: 2000
- Genre: Symphonic black metal
- Length: 38:09
- Language: Chinese, English, Taiwanese
- Label: Crystal
- Producer: Chthonic

Chthonic chronology
Where the Ancestors' Souls Gathered (1999)	9th Empyrean (2000)	Relentless Recurrence (2002)

Cover on English Version

9th Empyrean is the second studio album by Taiwanese black metal band Chthonic, released in 2000. The album was originally only available in Taiwan, until it was re-released by Nightfall Records in English format in 2002. Both versions of the album are now out of print and is hard to find.

It is the only Chthonic album to feature two different (although similar) album covers upon its initial release.

== Track listing ==
=== Chinese version ===
No.	Title	Length
1.	"海息 慢板"	2:45
2.	"第一節 序"	1:39
3.	"第二節 幽游冥河"	6:58
4.	"第三節 支那之喚"	6:02
5.	"第四節 匯神"	1:43
6.	"第五節 侵"	7:46
7.	"第六節 玄蒼"	2:10
8.	"第七節 永固邦稷"	9:15

=== English version (2002) ===
No.	Title	Length
1.	"Breath of Ocean"	2:45
2.	"Mother Isle Disintegrated. Aboriginal Gods Enthroned (Chapter 2)"	1:39
3.	"Floated Unconsciously In the Acheron"	6:58
4.	"Summon of China"	6:02
5.	"Gods Souls Gathered"	1:43
6.	"Invasion"	7:46
7.	"Upon the Empyrean"	2:10
8.	"Guard the Isle Eternally"	9:06

== Personnel ==
- Freddy Lim – lead vocals, erhu
- Jesse Liu – guitar, backing vocals
- Doris Yeh – bass, backing vocals
- Ambrosia – keyboards
- A-Jay – drums
