= Where the Ancestors' Souls Gathered =

Studio album by ChthoniC
- Released: January 11, 1999
- Recorded: 1998
- Studio: Apa Studio
- Genre: Symphonic black metal
- Length: 43:18
- Language: Chinese
- Label: Independent
- Producer: Chthonic

ChthoniC chronology
Where the Ancestors' Souls Gathered (1999)	9th Empyrean (2000)

Where the Ancestors' Souls Gathered is the debut studio album by Taiwanese black metal band Chthonic, released in 1999. The album was only available in Taiwan, and is now out of print and original copies of the album are very hard to find, though it is occasionally found online being sold at high prices. The album was released in LP format by Fredmosa Records in 2002. This was the only album by the band that was never made in an alternative English version, however, English print does appear on certain areas of the artwork.

This is the band's only album with guitarist Null, bassist Xiao-Yu and drummer Xiao-Wang.

== Track listing ==
No.	Title	Length
1.	"序曲 / Drift Out to Mystery"	0:42
2.	"越海 / Across the Sea"	4:41
3.	"海息 / Breath of Ocean"	3:16
4.	"母島解體‧登基 / Mother Isle Disintegrated, Aboriginal Gods Enthroned"	9:52
5.	"深耕 / Deep Rising (Across the Sea 2)"	4:01
6.	"燕歌行 / Yen Geh Shin"	4:55
7.	"血雲朵 / Bloody Cloud"	3:48
8.	"聖戰 / Holy War (Across the Sea 3)" (includes hidden track "榆樹街之夢魘 / Nightmare")	13:58

Bonus track
No.	Title	Length
9.	"榆樹街之夢魘 / Incubus"	5:03

== Personnel ==
- Freddy Lim – vocals, erhu
- Null – guitar
- Xiao-Yu – bass
- Ambrosia – keyboards
- Xiao-Wang – drums
