= Relentless Recurrence =

Studio album by ChthoniC
- Released: April 1, 2002 (Taiwan); June 26, 2007 (EU & US)
- Recorded: Borsing Recording Studio, 2002
- Genre: Symphonic black metal
- Length: 54:40
- Language: Chinese, English, Taiwanese
- Label: Crystal Lake
- Producer: Chthonic

ChthoniC chronology
9th Empyrean (2000)	Relentless Recurrence (2002)	Satan's Horns (2003)

Alternative cover
- Relentless Recurrence 2007 re-release cover & back

Professional ratings
Review scores
Source	Rating
AllMusic	3.5/5 stars
Sea of Tranquility	4/5 stars

Relentless Recurrence is the third studio album by the Taiwanese black metal band Chthonic, released in 2002. The album was only available in Taiwan until its re-release in 2007 by SPV with revamped packaging, including English translations.

A music video was released for the song "Onset of Tragedy" and was the band's first music video.

== Track listing ==
English version

No.	Title	Length
1.	"Nemesis"	2:40
2.	"Onset of Tragedy"	6:32
3.	"Obituary Tuning"	3:39
4.	"Grievance, Acheron Poem"	8:35
5.	"Revert to Mortal Territory"	3:42
6.	"Funest Demon Born"	2:25
7.	"Vengeance Arise"	4:30
8.	"Slaughter in Tri-Territory"	8:07
9.	"Grab the Soul to Hell"	5:05
10.	"Relentless Recurrence"	7:16

Chinese (traditional) version

No.	Title	Length
1.	"業" (Ye)	2:44
2.	"悲命格" (Be Ming Ge)	6:33
3.	"恨葬林投" (Hen Zang Lin Tou)	3:39
4.	"冥河冤賦" (Ming He Yuan Fu)	8:37
5.	"返陽救子" (Fan Yang Jiu Zi)	3:42
6.	"厲鬼生" (Li Gui Shen)	2:26
7.	"殺徒" (Sha Tu)	4:26
8.	"恨弒三界" (Hen Shi San Jie)	8:20
9.	"掠魂入閻獄" (Lve Hun Ru Yan Yu)	8:12
10.	"永劫輪迴" (hidden track)	8:10

== Personnel ==
Chthonic

- Freddy Lim – lead vocals, erhu
- Jesse Liu – guitar, backing vocals
- Doris Yeh – bass, backing vocals
- Vivien Chen – keyboards
- A-Jay – drums

Production

- Jan Borsing – sound engineer
