= Chthonic (band) =

Taiwanese musical group

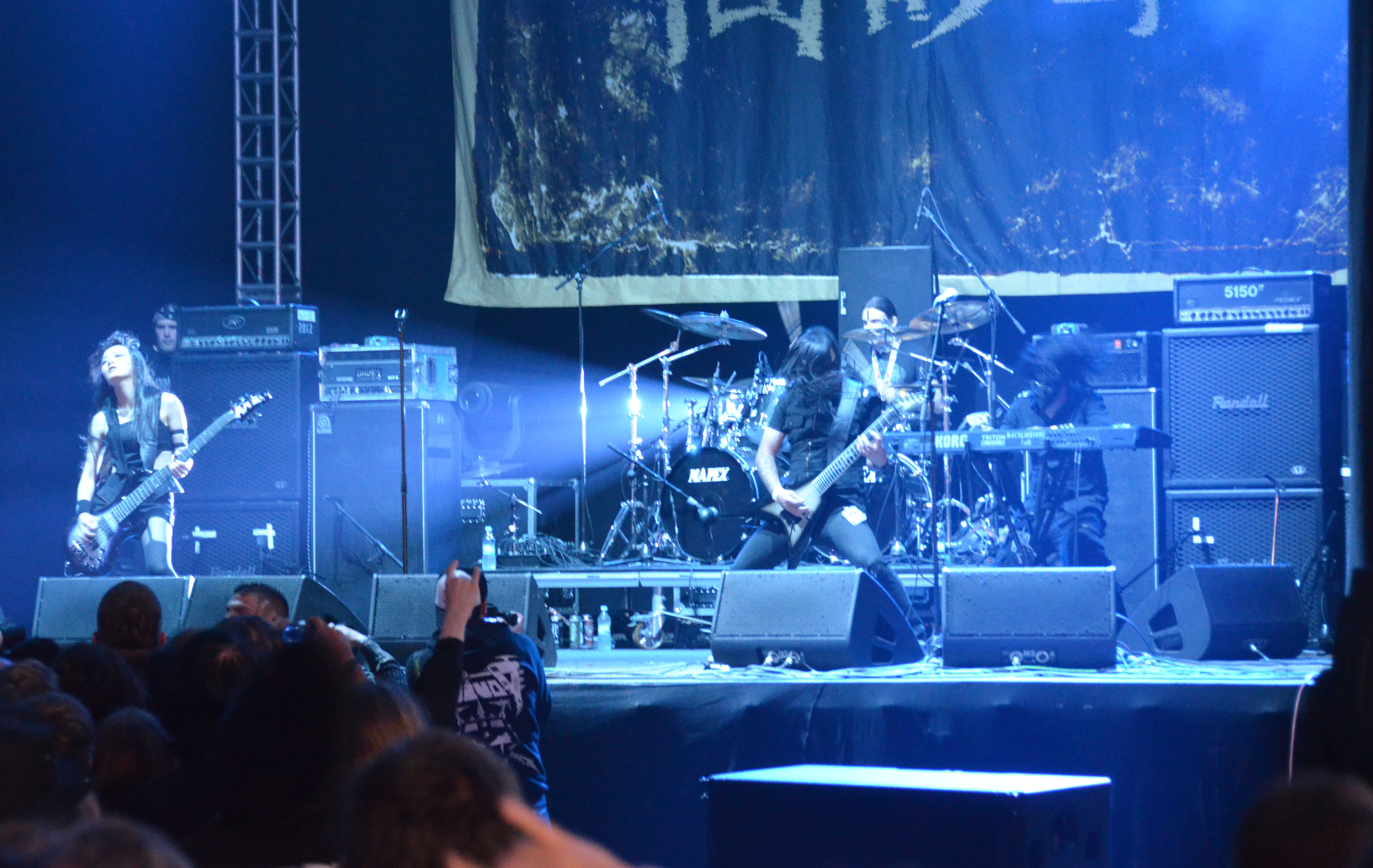
- Chthonic performing at Wacken Open Air, Germany, 2012

Background information
- Origin: Taipei, Taiwan
- Genres: Blackened death metal; melodic death metal; symphonic black metal; folk metal; Oriental metal
- Years active: 1995–present
- Label: Spinefarm (Universal Music)
- Members: Freddy Lim; Doris Yeh; Jesse Liu; Dani Wang; CJ Kao
- Website: Official website

Chinese name
- Traditional Chinese: 閃靈
Transcriptions
Standard Mandarin
- Hanyu Pinyin: shǎn líng

Chthonic (styled as ChthoniC or ChThoniC) is a Taiwanese heavy metal band, formed in 1995 in Taipei. They have been called "the Black Sabbath of Asia." The group incorporates traditional Taiwanese music, including adaptations of folk songs and traditional instruments, notably the erhu (often called the hiân-á [絃仔] in the band's native Taiwanese Hokkien). Their goal is to bring ancient history and mythology into the modern era to build awareness of the myths of Taiwan and tragic events in that country's history (for example, those experienced by the Seediq people).

Since 2011, their trademark erhu has been complemented with stringed instruments, including the koto and shamisen, as well as Tibetan bells and shakuhachi and Seediq hunting flutes (Chinese: 獵首笛), the last of which are traditionally used by the indigenous people of Taiwan. The band members are acclaimed artists and political activists who advocate independence for Taiwan and self-determination for Tibetans and Uighurs. Singer Freddy Lim served as Chairman of the Taiwan chapter of Amnesty International from 2010 to 2014, and has been a legislator since 2016, first representing the New Power Party before becoming an independent. Since their formation, Chthonic has released eight studio albums. The most recent, Battlefields of Asura, was released in October 2018.

== History ==
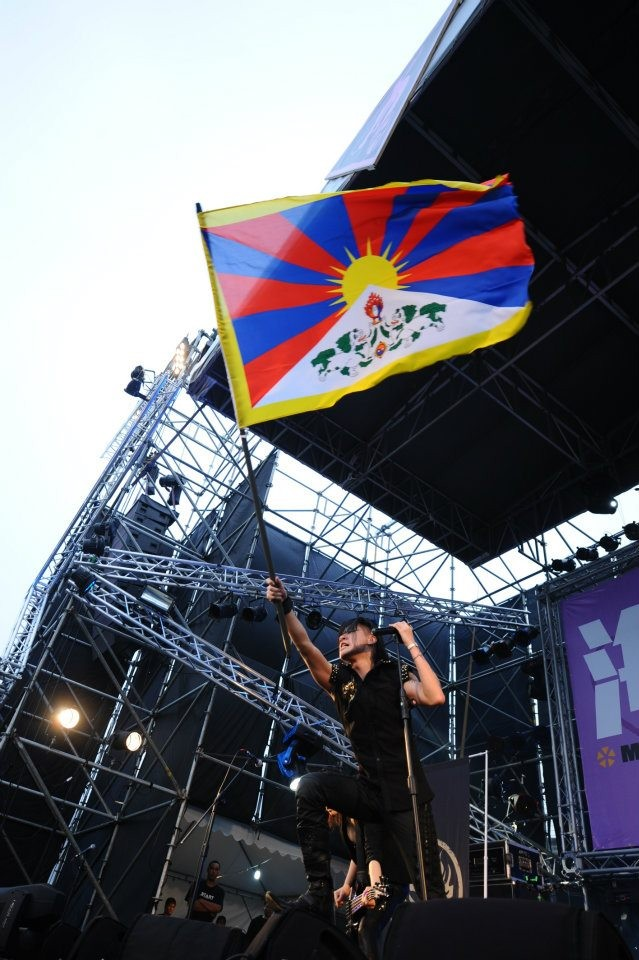
Freddy Lim started the band in 1995. He was the Chairman of Amnesty International Taiwan from 2010 to 2014 and became an elected representative in the Legislative Yuan.

"Broken Jade" from Takasago Army (2011).

=== Formation (1995–1998) ===
Chthonic was formed in 1995, and the band name "Chthonic" is a Greek term referring to the earth and the underworld. In the west, the term is usually pronounced thonic. The original members were Freddy Lim and some of his classmates from high school and university. The line-up went through many changes before the band released their debut album in 1998. By that point the line-up had settled around Freddy Lim on vocals and erhu, Zac Chang on guitar, Xiao-Yu on bass, Xiao-Wang on drums, and Ambrosia on keyboards and backing vocals. Chthonic became quite popular in the rock scene in Taiwan. They played to a full house at Vibe, the main rock club in Taipei at the time, and played as headliners for large rock festivals like Spring Scream. They released their first single "Deep Plowing" ("深耕") in early 1998.

In their early years, Chthonic tried different styles of heavy metal. Lim sang clean vocals in "The Breath of Ocean" ("海息"); the early song "Cultivating" ("深耕") can be classified as power metal while "Decomposition of the Mother Isle (Aboriginal Gods Enthroned)" ("母島解體登基") is black metal. Keyboardist Ambrosia occasionally sang in the early songs as well. From the start, Lim has written songs in Taiwanese, Classical Chinese, and Mandarin Chinese; more recent albums have been released in English versions as well.

=== Success in Asia (1998–2002) ===
Chthonic's debut album, Where the Ancestors' Souls Gathered (祖靈之流), was released in late 1998. The band released the album independently and it reached No. 2 on the Tower Records pop music chart for Asia. In 1999 Zac, Xiao-Yu, and Xiao-Wang left the band and were replaced by Jesse Liu, Doris Yeh, and AJ Tsai respectively. The band recorded their second album 9th Empyrean (靈魄之界), which was released in Taiwan by Crystal Records in 2000. It reached No. 1 on the Tower Records pop music chart for Asia and was also considered one of the best ten Mandarin albums of that year by Hong Kong's MCB magazine. This album's music style is closer to symphonic black metal, with Lim adopting harsh vocals mixed with keyboardist Ambrosia's female singing. The song "Guard the Isle Eternally" ("永固邦稷") was the first Chthonic song to mix Asian pentatonic scale melodies with black metal.

In 2000, Chthonic appeared at the Fuji Rock Festival, one of the biggest rock festivals in Japan, and embarked on their first international tour through Japan, Hong Kong, Malaysia, and Singapore. In Hong Kong, they signed with Catalyst Action Records, and in Japan, Soundholic was their distributor.

In 2001, keyboardist Ambrosia left the band and was replaced by Vivien Chen. Chthonic then recorded their third album, Relentless Recurrence, which was based on the legendary Taiwanese ghost story "Nâ-tâu-tsí--á." The album was recorded in Denmark and released in Taiwan by Crystal Records in 2002. The album retains the symphonic black metal style mixed with Taiwanese elements. Relentless Recurrence was also the first Chthonic album written entirely in Taiwanese. In 2002 the band completed their second international tour, and played at the old stadium of National Taiwan University with traditional Taiwanese lion drums and a traditional Taiwanese orchestra.

=== Success in Europe and the United States (2002–2008) ===
In 2002 Chthonic signed with Nightfall Records in the United States and released an English version of 9th Empyrean in North America. All subsequent Chthonic albums have been released internationally in English versions. In 2002 the band played festivals in the United States, Japan, and Hong Kong; and toured with Swedish black metal band Dark Funeral. In late 2002 keyboardist Vivien Chen left the band and was replaced by Luis Wei. In 2003 the band released the single "Satan's Horns," which was used as the theme song for the Taiwanese release of the movie Freddy vs. Jason. In 2003 they won the Best Band Award at the Taiwan Golden Melodies Award Ceremony.

In 2004 Alexia Lee replaced Luis Wei on keyboards and Dani Wang replaced AJ Tsai on drums. In 2005 the band released their fourth album, Seediq Bale, which is based on the Wushe Incident. In addition to symphonic black metal mixed with Taiwanese elements, Seediq Bale featured increased use of erhu, blast beats, and female vocals (including a guest appearance by pop singer Sandee Chan). The album was released in Mandarin Chinese and English versions, with both integrating some Seediq and Japanese lyrics. This album also supported donations for the movie project Seediq Bale directed by Wei Te-sheng, who in turn donated the film's trailer for Chthonic's use in the music video for "Quasi Putrefaction."

After the release of Seediq Bale keyboardist Alexia Lee left and was replaced by CJ Kao; the erhu player Su-nong also joined the band. In early 2006, Chthonic held the "A Decade on the Throne" concert in Huashan Culture Park, Taipei. To celebrate their tenth anniversary the band released a DVD of that concert, the compilation album Pandemonium, and the book CHTHONIC Dynasty (閃靈王朝) via Eurasian Books. Seediq Bale (English version) was released in 2006 and 2007 in many countries; in Japan it was released by Howling Bull, in North America by Megaforce Records, and in Europe by SPV Records; the album was also released in several South American and Asian countries. Revolver cited Chthonic as "The Band to Watch" and England's Alternative Vision awarded them "Band of the Month." In 2006, Lim founded the annual Megaport Music Festival, Taiwan's largest rock music event; after a hiatus when he went into politics, Lim continues to organize the annual event.

In 2007 Chthonic were featured as a second stage act at the 2007 Ozzfest tour. The band named that year's tour "UNlimited Taiwan Tour" to draw awareness to the fact that the United Nations does not recognize Taiwan. This symbolic protest was covered by the US mainstream media, including ABC television, New York Times, Los Angeles Times, Washington Post, and others. That year they also toured with Nile, Dååth, Obituary, Cradle of Filth, Marduk, Ensiferum, and 3 Inches of Blood while playing in several European countries. A book titled GUTS!, featuring a diary of the UNlimited Taiwan Tour, was released in Europe and Asia.

=== International recognition (2008–2013) ===
Chthonic released the album Mirror of Retribution in 2009 on Spinefarm Records, produced by Anthrax guitarist Rob Caggiano. Mirror of Retribution is based on the February 28 Incident and features guest appearances by singers Sandee Chan and Francine Boucher of the band Echoes of Eternity. The album was released in Taiwanese and English versions. The British music magazine Kerrang! called the album "Top-notch" metal, and Freddy Lim appeared on the cover of Terrorizer magazine.

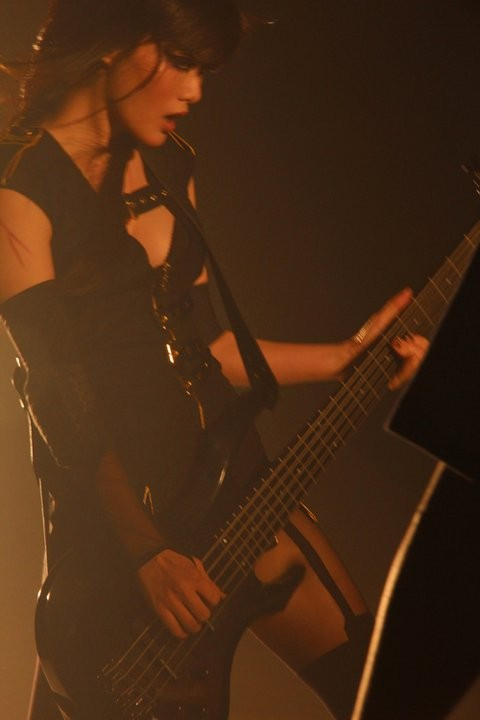
Doris Yeh joined Chthonic as bassist in 1999 and appeared on the cover of FHM Magazine Taiwan in November 2008 and June 2012.

During this period, bassist Doris Yeh became the band's spokesperson and business manager, taking over the roles performed by Freddy Lim since the band's formation in 1995. Yeh has since earned a great amount of publicity, speaking about the band's political beliefs in magazines like Monocle in the United Kingdom, Metropolis in Japan, and Cacao in Taiwan. Yeh has also been recognized as a model and sex symbol, appearing on the cover of the Taiwanese version of Body magazine and regularly being selected as one of the sexiest women in music by Revolver and the Taiwanese version of FHM.

Chthonic was named "Best International Artist" in 2009 at the Tibetan Music Awards. Erhu player Su-nong left the band in 2009, with Lim taking over that instrument. After many early changes, the lineup of Freddy Lim, Doris Yeh, Jesse Liu, Dani Wang, and CJ Kao has remained intact since 2009. In the 2009 Terrorizer readers' polls the band was voted No. 2 for best band, No. 2 for best album, and No. 2 for best performance; Freddy Lim was voted No. 3 for best singer, Doris Yeh was voted No. 2 for best bass player; Jesse Liu was voted No. 7 for best guitarist, and Dani Wang was voted No. 8 for best drummer. Yeh and Lim were also No. 9 and No. 10 respectively as best individual performer, making Chthonic the only band to have two members in the top 10 for that category. In 2009 and 2010 Chthonic continued to tour internationally, including stints with Satyricon, Bleeding Through, and Arch Enemy, plus appearances at several major heavy metal festivals in Asia and Europe. In 2010 the band released the digital single "Painkiller," a Judas Priest cover.

Their sixth album Takasago Army was released on Spinefarm Records in 2011. This album is based on the story of the Takasago Volunteers, Taiwanese aboriginal soldiers who fought for Japan during World War II. The album included guest appearances from singers Yu Tien and Chan Yawen, and Taroko musician Pitero Wukah on pgaku flute. Main songwriters Freddy Lim and Jesse Liu stated that Takasago Army marked a reversal in the band's writing, as the songs were first written in a traditional Taiwanese folk format but were then played with heavy metal techniques. Doris Yeh stated that the Western definition of "heavy metal," whether it is black metal or death metal, cannot easily define Chthonic's style; thus, having to choose a term, the band uses the term "Orient Metal."

Takasago Army reached No. 109 on Japan's Oricon music chart, and the video for the song "Takao" was nominated for the 2012 Golden Melody Award in Taiwan for best music video. The album was featured in the international metal magazines Revolver, Terrorizer, and Metal Hammer, and was named the year's best melodic black metal album by the critics' webzine Metal Storm. Furthermore, Boulevard Brutal, a French music critics' site, selected Takasago Army as the best black metal album of the year; and the Japanese rock magazine Burrn!! awarded the band a No. 7 rank for best album of the year and No. 23 for best heavy metal band.

After more international touring in North America, Europe, and Asia, including stints with Arch Enemy, DevilDriver, and Skeletonwitch, in October 2011 Chthonic organized a concert at Taiwan's remote Sing Ling Temple, a historical landmark mentioned in their last three albums. This concert featured a guest appearance by singer Randy Blythe of Lamb of God, while selected fans from outside of Taiwan were given free plane tickets to travel to the concert. The competition for tickets was covered widely in Taiwanese media. In early 2012 Chthonic released a DVD of the Sing Ling Temple concert and also made some acoustic appearances at Eslite bookstores in Taiwan. In 2012 Chthonic supported Lamb of God in Asia, while ESP Guitars released customized models for bassist Doris Yeh and guitarist Jesse Liu. Chthonic continued to play major festivals in Europe and Asia, with former Megadeth guitarist Marty Friedman appearing with the band at Japan's Fuji Rock Festival.

The band's seventh studio album, Bu-Tik, and was released in June 2013 worldwide through Spinefarm Records. The album cover for Bu-Tik depicts a nude female with white hair wielding a sword in her right hand and a prosthetic gun on her left arm.

=== Recent events (since 2014) ===
Timeless Sentence (失竊千年), a live album featuring acoustic rearrangements of songs from the two previous studio albums, was released in late 2014 by Spinefarm Records. In an interview, the band indicated that this will be their last acoustic album. Freddy Lim then expanded his political activities, founding the New Power Party in early 2015. In January 2016, Lim was elected to Taiwan's Legislative Yuan representing Taipei City Constituency 5. He was then assigned to the Foreign and National Defense Committee and has formed a caucus to address issues in Tibet.

In March 2017, Chthonic played at the Megaport Music Festival; bassist Doris Yeh was absent due to recently giving birth and Shingo☆ of Sex Machineguns filled in. A new song titled "Souls of the Revolution," featuring Randy Blythe, was released in December 2017. The song is featured in the band-produced film Tshiong, which was released in Taiwan on 29 December 2017. The film, in development since 2015 and also featuring Blythe, is an action-comedy starring the members of Chthonic as political activists trying to stop a development project in a small Taiwanese village. A soundtrack album featuring "Souls of the Revolution" and incidental score music was released in Asia.

At the 2018 Megaport Music Festival, Chthonic performed another new song called "A Crimson Sky's Command". Chthonic's eighth and most recent album Battlefields of Asura was released on October 10, 2018. In December 2018, Chthonic was unable to perform with Cantopop singer Denise Ho in Hong Kong since their work visa application was rejected due to domestic security reasons. The band ultimately ended up performing the song "Millennia's Faith Undone" remotely via Facebook. Thanks to Taiwan's success in handling the COVID-19 pandemic, the country authorized a return of the Megaport Music Festival in March 2021, organized by Freddy Lim and headlined by Chthonic, with 100 mostly Taiwanese rock bands. In March 2023, the band issued their first release in five years, the single "Pattokan", which addresses Taiwan's White Terror period.

Since 2023, Chthonic has reduced its studio activity and live performances, mostly due to Freddy Lim’s political career. He has since reduced his political activities and the band has returned to studio work.

== Activism and lyrical themes ==
Chthonic singer Freddy Lim is notably active in the Taiwanese political scene and supports that country's independence movement. He has been active in the Taiwan Association for Human Rights, Amnesty International (serving as President of that group's Taiwan chapter from 2010 to 2014), and other non-governmental human rights organizations. In 2003 and 2009, he promoted the Free Tibet Concert in Taiwan. In 2007 Lim and other artists organized an international music festival to commemorate the 60th anniversary of the February 28 Incident, entitled "Spirit of Taiwan: With Justice We Cure This Nation." He is now a representative in the Legislative Yuan.

In addition, bassist Doris Yeh has endorsed the Awakening Foundation, a women's rights organization in Taiwan. In February 2009, Lim and Yeh protested with human rights activists at the Taipei zoo panda exhibit, which symbolizes China's attempts to establish soft power relations with Taiwan. In August 2009, many aboriginal villages in Taiwan were heavily damaged by Typhoon Morakot, and Chthonic donated the proceeds from two concerts to an aboriginal organization. Lim personally carried supplies into the disaster areas. In March 2011, after the northeastern Japan earthquake, Chthonic raised and donated over one million NT$ for relief efforts.

During Chthonic's 2011 North American tour, they received a threatening letter from unknown Chinese persons. The band is also banned in parts of China for their political views.

The band's lyrics are often based on the defiant spirit of early Taiwanese colonizers, fictional wars between aboriginal gods and Han Chinese gods, Taiwanese folklore and mythology, historical events such as the Wushe Incident and the February 28 Incident, and the formation of the Takasago Volunteers. Prior to the album Seediq Bale most of the band's lyrics were written in Classical Chinese, which is rarely used in contemporary Chinese or Taiwanese music, and sung with Mandarin pronunciation. Starting with the album Mirror of Retribution the lyrics are written and sung in Taiwanese Hokkien. Some songs may also include verses in Japanese, Mandarin Chinese, or Formosan languages. Starting with Seediq Bale the band has released alternate versions of their albums for the international market, with some songs remixed with English lyrics.

== Stage performance ==
Chthonic is also known for their unique stage costumes, which originally included corpse paint similar to that used by many Scandinavian black metal bands, from which Chthonic drew their early inspiration. Starting in 1998 Chthonic incorporated some Taiwanese elements and characteristics into their stage attire, such as the "8 Generals of Hell" glyphs on Freddy Lim's forehead. Keyboardist CJ Kao uses a cloth inscribed with Chinese characters wrapped around his head, which in mythology is a spell to raise Chinese Vampires from the dead.

With the release of the album Takasago Army in 2011, Chthonic changed to costumes inspired by Asian military or martial arts attire. They stopped using corpse paint because the band members found it tedious to put on before concerts. Fans often toss hell money during Chthonic's stage performances to pay tribute to the lost souls described in the songs and to create a dark atmosphere. People of Chinese ethnicity who are unfamiliar with Chthonic may find this offensive or disrespectful because the practice is considered to be taboo. The band is also known for burning the flag of the Kuomintang Party, of whom the band are well-known critics, first doing so in the video for the song "Forty-Nine Theurgy Chains" in 2009. This aroused some controversy.

== Members ==
=== Current members ===
- Freddy Lim, "Left Face of Maradou" – lead vocals, erhu (1995–present)
- Doris Yeh, "Thunder Tears" – bass, backing vocals (1999–present)
- Jesse Liu, "The Infernal" – guitars, backing vocals (2000–present)
- Dani Wang, "Azathothian Hands" – drums (2005–present)
- CJ Kao, "Dispersed Fingers" – keyboards, synthesizer (2005–present)

=== Former members ===
- Ellis – guitars (1995–1998)
- Zac Chang – guitars (1998–1999)
- Null – guitars (1999–2000)
- Man 6 – bass (1995–1996)
- Xiao-Yu – bass (1996–1999)
- Terry – drums (1995–1997)
- Xiao-Wang – drums (1997–1999)
- A-Jay – drums (1999–2004)
- Ambrosia – keyboards (1995–2001)
- Vivien Chen – keyboards (2001–2002)
- Sheryl – keyboards (2002–2003)
- Luis Wei – keyboards, backing vocals (2003–2004)
- Alexia – keyboards (2004–2005)
- Su-nong, "The Bloody String" – erhu (2005–2008, session member 2011–present)

== Discography ==
=== Studio albums ===
- 祖靈之流 (Where the Ancestors' Souls Gathered) (1999)
- 靈魄之界 (9th Empyrean) (2000)
- 永劫輪迴 (Relentless Recurrence) (2002)
- 賽德克巴萊 (Seediq Bale) (2005)
- 十殿 (Mirror of Retribution) (2009)
- 高砂軍 (Takasago Army) (2011)
- 武德 (Bu-Tik) (2013)
- 政治 (Battlefields of Asura) (2018)

=== EPs ===
- 極惡限戰 (Satan's Horns) (2003)
- 鎮魂護國交響戰歌 (2015)

=== Singles ===
- "UNlimited Taiwan" (2007)
- "Painkiller" (2010)
- "皇軍 (Takao)" (2011)
- "Broken Jade" (2011)
- "Quell The Souls in Sing Ling Temple" (2011)
- "火燒．島 (Set Fire to the Island)" (2012)
- "暮沉武德殿 / Defenders of Bú-Tik Palace" (2013)
- "Supreme Pain for the Tyrant (Rearrange)" (2020)
- "關閉太陽 Turn The Sun Off (Live in Roar Now! Bangkah)" [Flesh Juicer ft. Freddy Lim and Jesse Liu] (2021)
- "護國山 (Pattonkan)" (2023)
- "百萬遍 (Endless Aeons)" (2025)

=== Demos ===
- 越海 第二樂章 – 深耕 (Deep Rising) (1998)
- 夢魘 (Nightmare) (1999)
- 鬼王西征 (King of Ghosts Western Conquest) (2002)

=== Compilation albums ===
- 冥誕七年.加藏 (Relentless for 7 Years, Plus) (2002)
- 鬼脈轉生 帝輪十年經典 (Anthology: A Decade on the Throne) (2006)
- Pandemonium (2007)

=== Live albums ===
- 登基十年 演唱會 (A Decade on the Throne) (2006) – Live DVD + 2CD
- 醒靈寺大決戦 (Final Battle at Sing Ling Temple) (2012) – Live DVD + 2CD
- 演武 (Ian Bu) (2014) - Live DVD + 2CD
- 失竊千年 (Timeless Sentence) (2014) - Live DVD + CD

=== Other ===
- 震氣蔓延 1995～2002 (Spread the Qi) (2003) – Double VCD
- 失落的令旗 (Souls of the Revolution) (soundtrack, 2017)

== Videography ==
=== DVD ===
- A Decade on the Throne (2006) – Live DVD + 2CD
- Final Battle at Sing Ling Temple (2012) – Live DVD + 2CD
- Ian Bu – Live in Formoz Festival 2013 (2014) - Live DVD + 2CD

=== Music videos ===
Year	Song	Album	Director
2002	"Onset of Tragedy"	Relentless Recurrence	Meng-Je Lee
2003	"Satan's Horns"	Satan's Horns	N/A
2005	"Quasi Putrefaction"	Seediq Bale	N/A
2007	"Progeny of Rmdax Tasing"	Seediq Bale	N/A
2007	"Indigenous Laceration"	Seediq Bale	N/A
2009	"Forty-Nine Theurgy Chains"	Mirror of Retribution	Vince Chuang
2011	"Takao"	Takasago Army	Zhiwen Zhuang
2011	"Broken Jade"	Takasago Army	Chuang Chi-Wen
2011	"Quell the Souls in Sing Ling Temple"	Takasago Army	Chuang Chi-Wen
2013	"Defenders of Bú-Tik Palace"	Bú-Tik	Zhiwen Zhuang and Yang Zhilong
2013	"Sail into the Sunset's Fire"	Bú-Tik	Lin Chun
2013	"Supreme Pain for the Tyrant"	Bú-Tik	Zheng Wentang and Zhang Yufeng
2013	"Set Fire to the Island"	Bú-Tik	Alulu Kuo
2013	"Next Republic"	Bú-Tik	Alulu Kuo
2014	"Rage of My Sword"	Bú-Tik	N/A
2018	"Millennia's Faith Undone"	Battlefields of Asura	Birdy Hong and Mo Pan
2018	"A Crimson Sky's Command"	Battlefields of Asura	Yen Hsun
2018	"Flames Upon the Weeping Wind"	Battlefields of Asura	Chuang Chi-wen
2020	"Supreme Pain for the Tyrant 2.0" (feat. Matt Heafy)	Non-album song	Vince Chuang

== Literary ==
- Dynasty (2006)
- Taiwan Guts (2008)

== Interviews ==
- Interview with Freddy Lim, Battle Helm, 2002
- Interview with Freddy Lim, Kyonsi Online, 2006
- Interview with Freddy Lim, Bright Eyes, 26 January 2007
- Interview with Freddy Lim, Ashiana Videos, 20 August 2007
- Interview with Doris, Freddy Lim, Jesse, CJ, Dani in Tokyo, Metalship, 12 July 2011
