= Seediq Bale (album) =

- Seediq Bale Album Cover (English version)

Studio album by ChthoniC
- Released: October 2005 (TW); November 2006 (US); February 2007 (EU, JP)
- Recorded: Borsing Recording Studio, Denmark, 2005
- Genre: Symphonic black metal
- Length: 43:35
- Language: Chinese, Taiwanese, English
- Label: Down Port Music; TRA Music
- Producer: Chthonic, Jan Borsing

ChthoniC chronology
Satan's Horns (2003)	Seediq Bale (2005)	Pandemonium (2007)

Professional ratings
Review scores
Source	Rating
411mania.com	6.5/10 link
Allmusic	link
Blogcritics	link
Stylus Magazine	B link
TransformOnline	Favourable link

Seediq Bale is the fourth studio album by Taiwanese black metal band Chthonic, released in 2005. The album was the band's first to receive full promotion and release outside of Asia, being released in November 2006 in the United States and worldwide in February 2007. It was positively reviewed by several websites and magazines,^{, ,} and boosted them into several popular magazines such as Terrorizer, as well as onto the lineups for both Ozzfest and Wacken Open Air.

The album featured session drummer Reno Kiilerich, formerly of Dimmu Borgir, and Sandee Chan, a Taiwanese singer, on female backing vocals. The English-language versions of the album fail to mention these members.

The English-language version includes three video tracks at the beginning of the disc: "Indigenous Laceration", "Quasi Putrefaction" and "Bloody Gaya Fulfilled".

== Track listing ==
Taiwanese version

No.	Title	Length
1.	"岩木之子"	4:35
2.	"黥面卸"	4:03
3.	"忿燃戰靈封"	1:03
4.	"大出草"	6:39
5.	"泣神"	5:55
6.	"叢屍繫冥河"	5:35
7.	"虹橋赴"	4:59
8.	"川中島之禁"	3:49
9.	"半屍橫氣山林"	6:57

English version

No.	Title	Length
1.	"Progeny of Rmdax Tasing"	4:35
2.	"Indigenous Laceration"	4:03
3.	"Enthrone"	1:03
4.	"Bloody Gaya Fulfilled"	6:39
5.	"The Gods Weep"	5:55
6.	"Where the Utux Ancestors Wait"	5:35
7.	"Exultant Suicide"	4:59
8.	"Banished into Death"	3:49
9.	"Quasi Putrefaction"	6:57

Enhanced content
No.	Title	Length
10.	"Video Data File"	0:06
11.	"Indigenous Laceration" (music video)	4:09
12.	"Quasi Putrefaction" (music video)	6:43
13.	"Bloody Gaya Fulfilled" (live video)	6:22

== Credits ==
=== Taiwanese version ===
- Freddy Lim – vocals, erhu
- Jesse Liu – guitar
- Reno Kiilerich – drums
- Doris Yeh – bass guitar
- Roger (Su-Nung) – erhu
- Alexia – keyboard
- Sandee Chan – backing vocals
- Jan Borsing – sound engineer

=== English version ===
- Freddy, Left Face of Maradou – vocals
- Jesse, the Infernal – guitar
- Doris, Thunder Tears – bass guitar, backing vocals
- Dani, Azathothian Hands – drums
- Su-Nung, the Bloody String – erhu
- CJ, Dispersed Fingers – keyboard
- Jan Borsing – sound engineer
