= New Taipei City Constituency 3 =

Constituency of the Legislative Yuan of Taiwan

- Single-member constituency for the Legislative Yuan
- District(s): Sanchong (103 villages)
- Electorate: 265,754 (2024 election)

Current constituency
- Created: 2008 (as Taipei County Constituency 3); 2010 (current name)
- Party: DPP
- Member: Lee Kuen-cheng

New Taipei City Constituency 3 (Chinese: 新北市第三選舉區; pinyin: Xīnběi Shì Dìsān Xuǎnjǔ Qū) is one of the 73 regional constituencies represented in the Legislative Yuan, the national legislature of Taiwan. It was created in 2008 (as Taipei County Constituency 3) following a series of constitutional reforms, and elects one legislator, through first-past-the-post voting, to the Legislative Yuan. It has been represented by Lee Kuen-cheng of the Democratic Progressive Party since 2024.

== Legislators ==
Election	Legislator	Party
2008 - 2012	Yu Tian	Democratic Progressive Party
2012 - 2019	Kao Chih-peng	Democratic Progressive Party
2019 - 2024	Yu Tian	Democratic Progressive Party
2024	Lee Kuen-cheng	Democratic Progressive Party

== Election results ==

=== 2008 (Note: Named Taipei County Constituency 3, boundaries unchanged.) ===
2008 Taiwanese legislative election: Taipei County 3
Candidate	Party	Votes	%
Yu Tian	Democratic Progressive Party	75,212	49.51
Chu Chun-hsiao	Kuomintang	73,286	48.25
Liu Yi-te	Taiwan Solidarity Union	1,645	1.08
Liu Ying-jui	Red Party	990	0.65
Su Ching-yen	Independent	767	0.50
Total		151,900	100.00
Valid votes		151,900	98.50
Invalid/blank votes		2,321	1.50
Total votes		154,221	100.00
Registered voters/turnout		245,001	62.95
Majority		1,926	1.26
Democratic Progressive Party win (new seat)			

=== 2012 ===
2012 Taiwanese legislative election: New Taipei 3
Candidate	Party	Votes	%	+/–
Kao Chih-peng	Democratic Progressive Party	95,649	49.26	▼0.25
Lee Chien-lung	Kuomintang	94,634	48.74	▲0.49
Hsiao Ping-hsien	National Health Service Alliance	2,836	1.46	NEW
Wu Ching	Institutional Island of Saving the World	1,059	0.55	NEW
Total		194,178	100.00	–
Valid votes		194,178	98.35	
Invalid/blank votes		3,263	1.65	
Total votes		197,441	100.00	
Registered voters/turnout		254,922	77.45	
Majority		1,015	0.52	
Democratic Progressive Party hold				

=== 2016 ===
* denotes the incumbent legislator

2016 Taiwanese legislative election: New Taipei 3
Candidate	Party	Votes	%	+/–
Kao Chih-peng*	Democratic Progressive Party	96,557	54.54	▲5.28
Lee Chien-lung	Kuomintang	62,723	35.43	▼13.31
Chang Sho-wen	People First Party	13,375	7.56	NEW
Yao Yin-hung	Trees Party	1,314	0.74	NEW
Lin Chi-ying	Social Welfare Party	1,114	0.63	NEW
Chen Chang-fa	Taiwan Constitution Association	655	0.37	NEW
Hsiao Chung-han	National Health Service Alliance	546	0.31	▼1.15
Su Ching-yen	Independent	429	0.24	NEW
Huang Mao	Independent	315	0.18	NEW
Total		177,028	100.00	–
Valid votes		177,028	98.15	
Invalid/blank votes		3,333	1.85	
Total votes		180,361	100.00	
Registered voters/turnout		259,224	69.58	
Majority		33,834	19.11	
Democratic Progressive Party hold				

=== 2019 by-election ===
Called due to incumbent legislator Kao Chih-peng being imprisoned for corruption.

2019 Taiwanese legislative by-elections: New Taipei 3
Candidate	Party	Votes	%	+/–
Yu Tian	Democratic Progressive Party	56,888	52.04	▼2.50
Cheng Shih-wei	Kuomintang	51,127	46.77	▲11.34
Su Ching-yen	Independent	1,303	1.19	▲0.95
Total		109,318	100.00	–
Valid votes		109,318	99.44	
Invalid/blank votes		621	0.56	
Total votes		109,939	100.00	
Registered voters/turnout		261,154	42.10	
Majority		5,761	5.27	
Democratic Progressive Party hold				

=== 2020 ===
* denotes the incumbent legislator

2020 Taiwanese legislative election: New Taipei 3
Candidate	Party	Votes	%	+/–
Yu Tian*	Democratic Progressive Party	90,022	45.77	▼6.27
Li weng Yue-e	Independent	63,832	32.45	NEW
Li Min-wei	Taiwan People's Party	35,843	18.22	NEW
Lin I-hsuan	Green Party Taiwan	3,731	1.90	NEW
Lo Ho-tsan	Independent	2,390	1.22	NEW
Li Chung-wei	Independent	447	0.23	NEW
Su Ching-yen	Independent	437	0.22	▼0.97
Total		196,702	100.00	–
Valid votes		196,702	98.30	
Invalid/blank votes		3,400	1.70	
Total votes		200,102	100.00	
Registered voters/turnout		262,709	76.17	
Majority		26,190	13.32	
Democratic Progressive Party hold				

=== 2024 ===
2024 Taiwanese legislative election: New Taipei 3
Candidate	Party	Votes	%	+/–
Lee Kuen-cheng	Democratic Progressive Party	100,141	53.30	▲7.53
Tsai Ming-tang	Kuomintang	79,828	42.49	NEW
Su Ching-yen	Independent	4,805	2.56	▲2.34
Chen Tung-yun	Independent	3,094	1.65	NEW
Total		187,868	100.00	–
Valid votes		187,868	96.64	
Invalid/blank votes		6,528	3.36	
Total votes		194,396	100.00	
Registered voters/turnout		265,754	73.15	
Majority		20,313	10.81	
Democratic Progressive Party hold				
