= 1976 (band) =

Taiwanese rock band

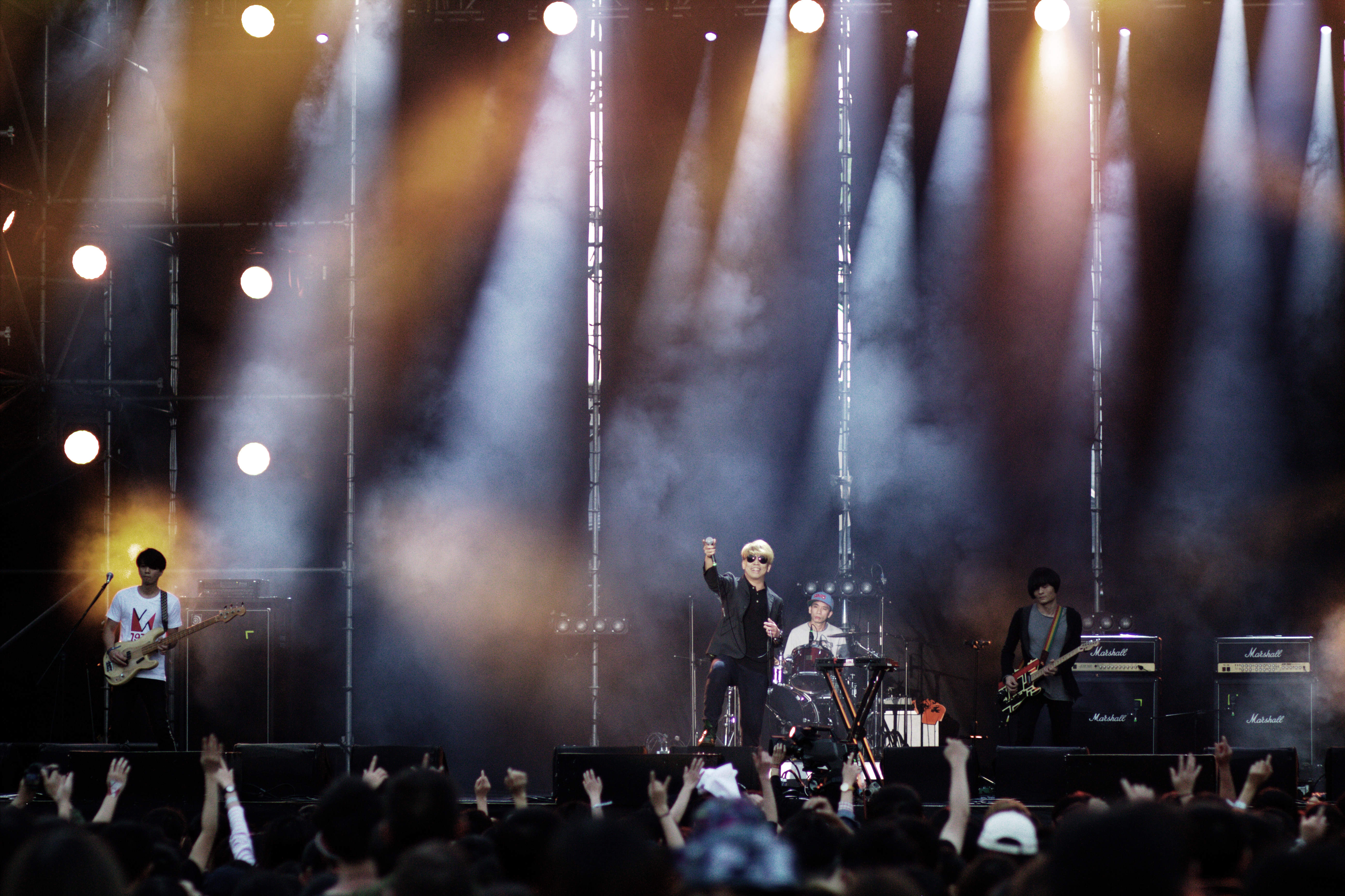
- 1976 performing at Megaport Music Festival in 2016

Background information
- Origin: Taiwan
- Genres: Pop rock; indie rock
- Years active: 1996–present
- Label: Sony BMG (2008–present)
- Members: Raykai (vocals); Zac (guitar); Big Brother (drums); Chouc (bass)
- Past members: A-Chi; U-Zen; Hikky; Rez
- Website: http://the1976.com/

1976 is a Taiwanese rock band formed in the summer of 1996. The band has published several albums and performed at festivals such as Formoz Festival, Spring Scream, and Urban Simple Life.

== Biography ==
1976 was formed in 1996, named "1976" because the original members were born mostly in 1976: Zac Chang, Raykai Chen, U-Zen Wang, Shi-Chon Tsai. They were students at that time. The members of 1976 now are Zac Chang (guitar, 張崇偉, nickname 大麻), Raykai Chen (vocal & acoustic guitar, 陳瑞凱, nickname 阿凱), Warren Lin (drums, 林雨霖, nickname 大師兄), and Chouc Lin (bass, 林子喬, nickname 子喬).

The first album of 1976 "1976-1" was published by themselves in 1999. Then their second album ”Sense of direction”(2000) and third album “Encourage with love” (2001) received awards from The Association of Music Workers in Taiwan. The albums were released on Taiwanese indie label Crystal Records.

Band members changed over time due to various circumstances such as national service. Between the summers of 2001 and 2003, the band was suspended, and they made their comeback at the Formaz Festival of 2003.

Their 4th album, the first one after their pause, "Still the New Wave Flow" was published in 2006 and recorded in Beijing, China.

In 2008, their fifth album, Asteroid 1976, released on Sony BMG. 1976 performed as the opening act for Oasis in Taipei in April 2009. In November the same year, the band released their 6th album, Manic Pixie Dream Girl.

In 2010, 1976 joined the original soundtrack album of the Taiwanese movie Monga. They were also awarded the Best Group of the 21st Golden Melody Awards (Pop Music) award, for "Manic Pixie Dream Girl".

The first time 1976 performed abroad was in Japan, 2006. In summer of 2010, they participated in the World Routes Summer Festivals 2010 in Toronto, Ontario and Vancouver, British Columbia, Canada. In January 2011, they participated in Taiwan Night held by Government Information Office with Suming, Deserts Chang & Algae in Paris and Cannes, France.

== Discography ==
=== Studio albums ===
- 1976-1 (1999)
- Sense of Direction (2000)
- Encourage with Love (2001)
- Still the New Wave Flow (2006)
- Asteroid 1976 (2008)
- Manic Pixie Dream Girl (2009)

=== EPs ===
- In Clubbing We Trust (2007)

=== Unplugged albums ===
- Late Summer of 1976 (2004)

== Sources ==
- the 1976 discuss board at ptt bbs
- 1976 Blog (Roodo) "In Clubbing we Trust"
- Original Soundtrack Kafka Urban Folk
- official album site (Sony BMG)
- ELUS TAIWANfest Crossover in Harbourfront Centre, Toronto, Ontario, Canada
- What's On at TAIWANfest in Vancouver Art Gallery Plaza, Vancouver, Canada
- finalist of the 1st Golden Indie Music Award
- NUIT DE TAIWAN at Nouveau Casino, Paris
