= 2026 Taipei City local election =

- 28 November 2026
- Mayoral election
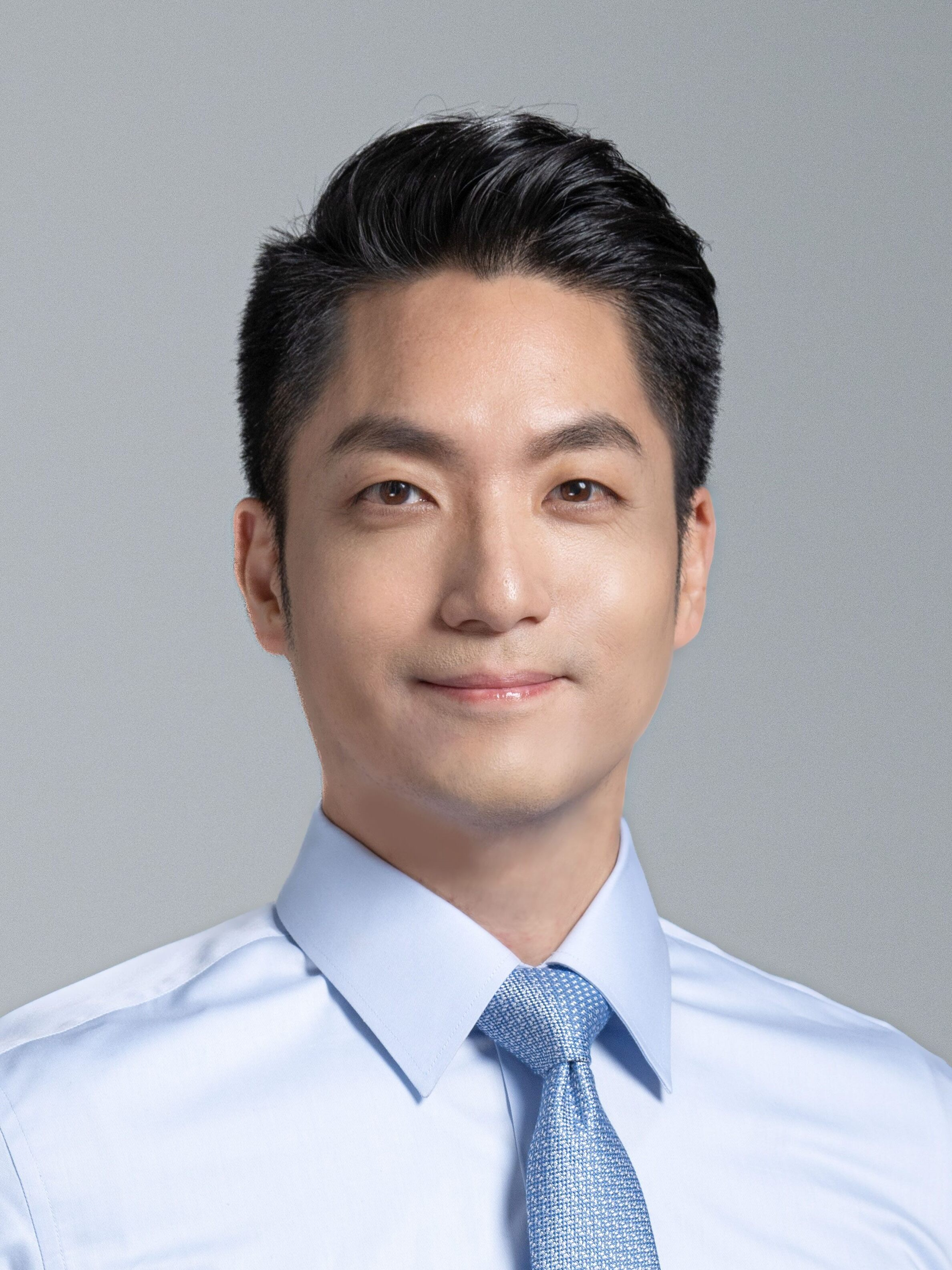

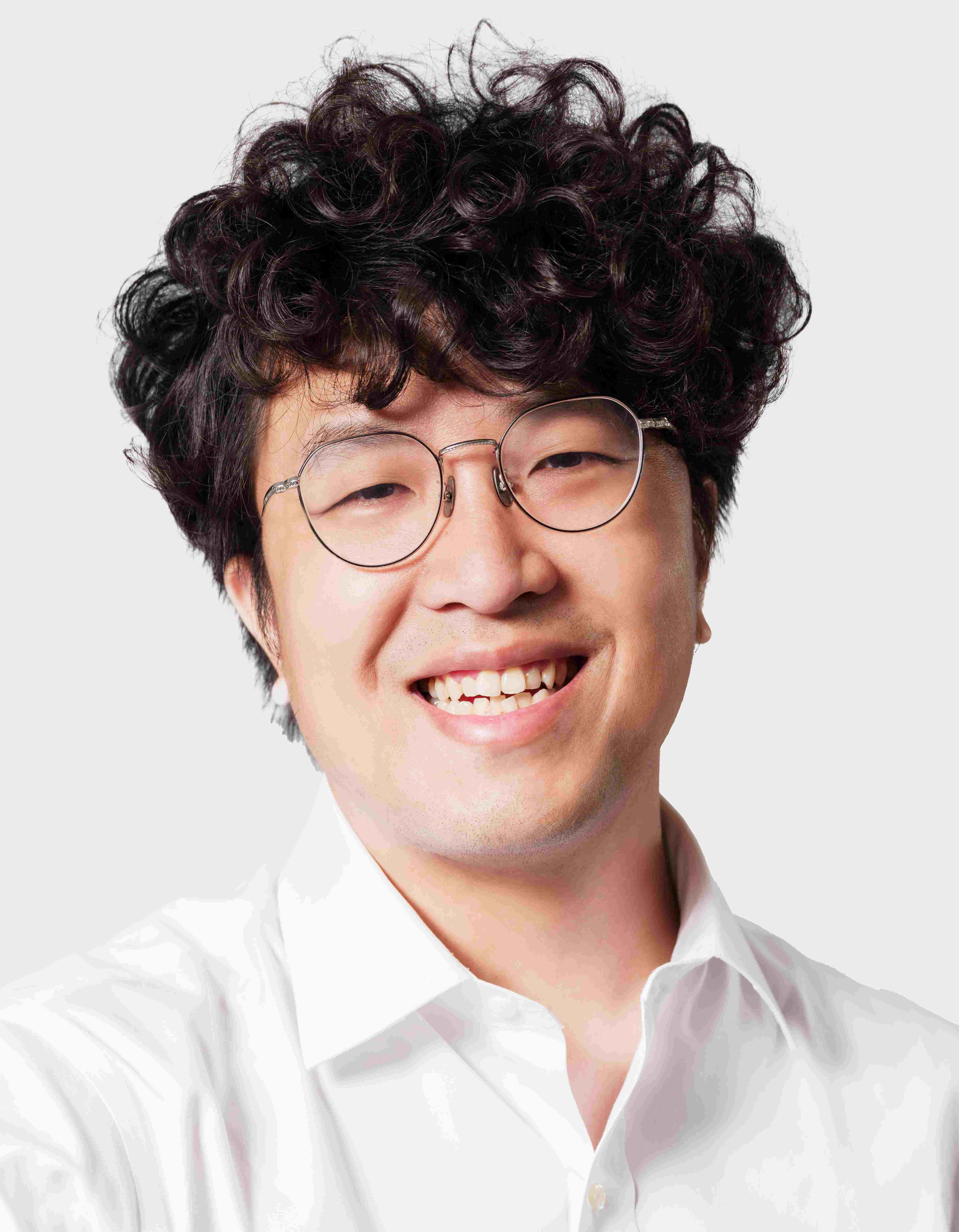
Nominee	Chiang Wan-an	Puma Shen
Party	KMT	DPP
Alliance	KMT-TPP coalition
Incumbent Mayor
Chiang Wan-an
KMT
- Council election
- All 61 seats in the Taipei City Council; 31 seats needed for a majority
Party	Leader	Current seats
Kuomintang	Tai Hsi-chin	28
Democratic Progressive Party	Wu Pei-yi	19
Taiwan People's Party	Chiu Hui-ju	4
New Party	Wu Cherng-dean	1
Taiwan Go Go	no leader	0

The 2026 Taipei City local election will take place on 28 November 2026, to elect the mayor of Taipei, and all seats to city council elections. They will be held as part of local elections across the country.

== Background ==
Taipei City is the second-largest city in Taiwan with a population of approximately 2.5 million, as well as being its capital. It forms the core of the Taipei metropolitan area, the largest metropolitan area in Taiwan by population.

Since 1994, the Mayor of Taipei has been directly elected by the people. In the first direct election, Democratic Progressive Party (DPP) candidate Chen Shui-bian was elected as the inaugural mayor. From 1998 to 2014, all mayors were from the Kuomintang (KMT). Between 2014 and 2022, the mayoralty was held by Independent-candidate-turned-Taiwan People's Party leader Ko Wen-je. Since 2022, the mayoralty has been held by Chiang Wan-an of the KMT. Two former mayors, Chen Shui-bian and Ma Ying-jeou, were later elected as president.

== Electoral system ==
=== Mayor ===
The mayor of Taipei shall be elected by first-past-the-post voting.

=== Council ===
All 61 seats shall be elected by the single non-transferable vote electoral system, of which 14 must be filled by women, in 8 electoral districts. Districts 1 to 6 shall be multi-member districts, with a gender quota of 14, totalling 59 seats. Districts 7 and 8 are single-member districts reserved for indigenous Taiwanese voters, with no gender quota, elected through first-past-the-post voting.

== Polling ==
=== Following candidate declarations ===
Date(s) conducted	Pollster	Sample size	Chiang KMT	Shen DPP	Kuo TMGP	Tang TTFPUA	Hsiao MiLinguall	Lin IND	None/Undecided	Lead
14-15 November 2026	TVBS	1,331	46%	44%					10%	2
11-13 November 2026	Hsinmin Association	1,072	33.8%	48.6%	1%		0.1%		12.1%	14.8
7-13 November 2026	Taiwan Inspiration Assocation	1,325	42.7%	47.7%					6.6%	5
10-12 November 2026	Ketagalan Foundation	1,071	42.2%	46.3%	0.8%			0.1%	8.6%	4.1
4-9 November 2026	FTNN	2,026	43%	44.7%			0.2%		12%	1.7
31 October 2026	TVBS	1,747	46%	42%					12%	4
20-22 October 2026, 25 October 2026	United Daily News	1,115	41%	45%					13%	4
18-19 October 2026	Shanshui Public Opinion Research Company	1,074	39.0%	42.8%					18.2%	3.8
14-16 October 2026	Hsinmin Association	1,075	33.3%	50.3%	0.4%	0.1%	0.1%	0.7%	12.2%	17
3 October 2026, 5-7 October 2026	TVBS	1,120	49%	41%					11%	8
16-18 September 2026	Hsinmin Association	1,076	41.7%	40.5%	0.7%	0.6%	0.5%	0.3%	10.6%	1.2
5-7 August 2026	TPOC Taiwan Issues Research Center	1,099	48.4%	33.0%					18.7%	15.4
21-22 June 2026	Shanshui Public Opinion Research Company	1,074	55.2%	27.5%					17.4%	27.7
21-26 May 2026	TVBS	901	58%	30%					12%	28
4-5 May 2026	New Taiwan Policy Research Institute	1,095	52.9%	29.7%					17.4%	23.2

== Mayoral results ==
2026 Taiwanese local elections: Taipei Mayor
Candidate	Party
Chiang Wan-an	Kuomintang
Puma Shen	Democratic Progressive Party
Kuo Hsi	Taiwan Mahjong Greatest Party
Tang Xin-min	Third Force Alliance
Hsiao Wen-chien	MiLinguall Party
Lin Chi-cheng	Independent
Total

== Council results ==
=== By district ===
==== District 1 ====
12 Seats to elect, including 3 women

Taipei City Council electoral district 1
Party
Total

==== District 2 ====
9 seats to elect, including 2 women

Taipei City Council electoral district 2
Party
Total

==== District 3 ====
9 seats to elect, including 2 women

Taipei City Council electoral district 3
Party
Total

==== District 4 ====
8 seats to elect, including 2 women

Taipei City Council electoral district 4
Party
Total

==== District 5 ====
8 seats to elect, including 2 women

Taipei City Council electoral district 5
Party
Total

==== District 6 ====
13 seats to elect, including 3 women

Taipei City Council electoral district 6
Party
Total

==== District 7 ====
1 seat to elect

Taipei City Council electoral district 7
Candidate	Party
Lin Hsiao-wei (Icyang Tamana)	Independent
Lee Fang-ju	Kuomintang
Total

==== District 8 ====
1 seat to elect

Taipei City Council electoral district 8
Candidate	Party
Haisul Islituan	Independent
Lin Jiahao	Democratic Progressive Party
Li Fuyuting	Kuomintang
Total
