= Megaport =

Megaport may refer to:

- Vizhinjam International Seaport Thiruvananthapuram (Trivandrum Seaport)
- Megaport (company), listed on the S&P/ASX 200
- Megaport Music Festival in Taiwan
- North Carolina International Port, project
- San Lorenzo Megaport Project, a proposed port plan
