= Lin Yu-fang =

Taiwanese political scientist and politician (born 1951)

- 林郁方
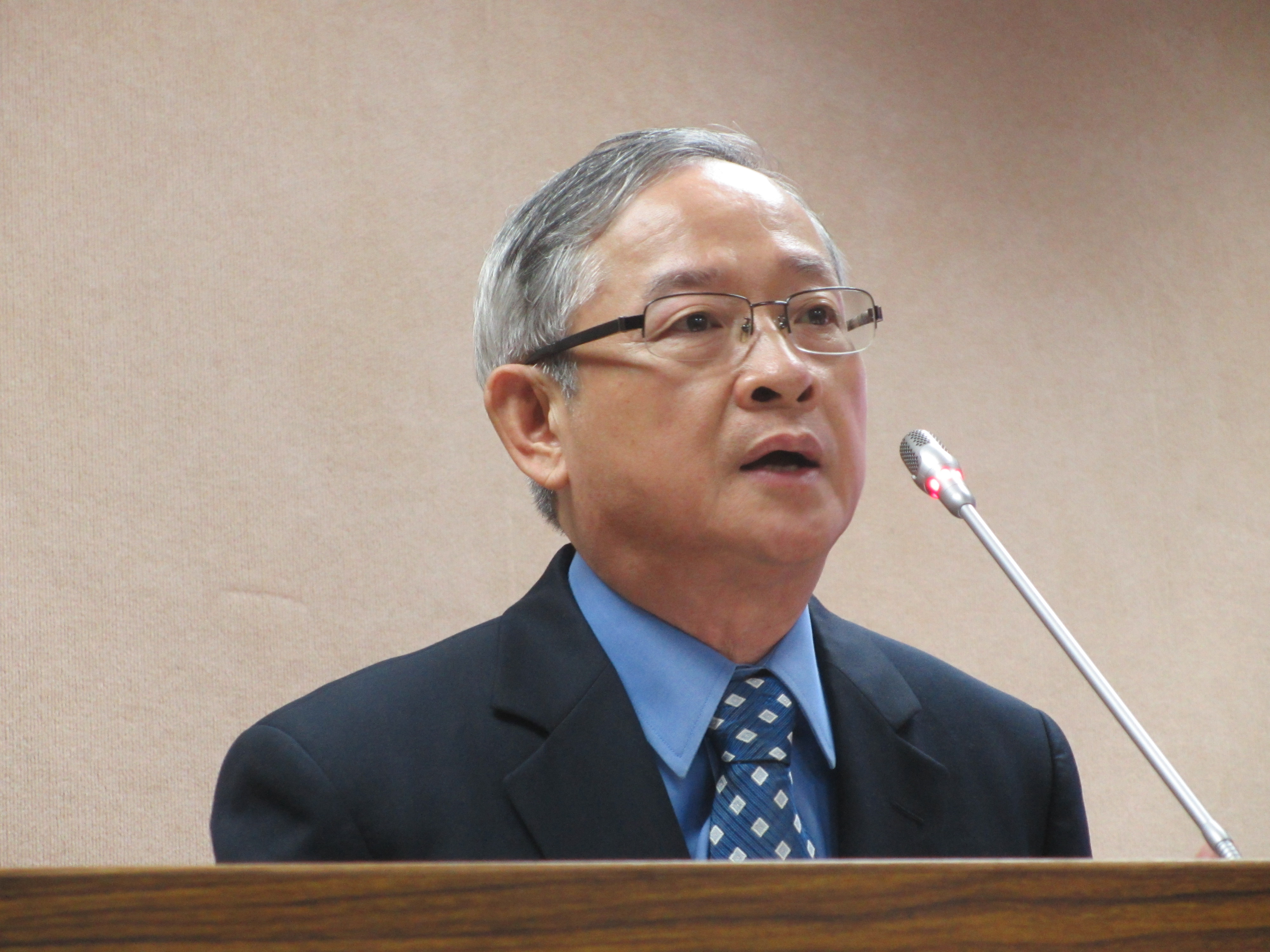

Member of the Legislative Yuan
- In office 1 February 2008 – 31 January 2016
- Preceded by: multi-member constituency
- Succeeded by: Freddy Lim
- Constituency: Taipei 5
- In office 1 February 2002 – 31 January 2008
- Preceded by: multi-member constituency
- Succeeded by: multi-member constituency
- Constituency: Taipei 2
- In office 1 February 1996 – 31 January 1999
- Constituency: Republic of China (New Party party-list)

Personal details
- Born: 15 March 1951 (age 75) Shanlin, Kaohsiung County, Taiwan
- Party: Kuomintang (since 2006); New Party (1993–2000); People First Party (2000–2006)
- Education: Tamkang University (BA, MA); University of Virginia (PhD)

Lin Yu-fang (Chinese: 林郁方; pinyin: Lín Yùfāng; born 15 March 1951) is a Taiwanese political scientist and politician. Lin was a Kuomintang legislator from 2008 to 2016 and the chairman of the Legislative Yuan's Diplomacy and National Defense Committee.

== Education ==
Lin obtained his bachelor's and master's degrees in English literature and American studies, respectively, from Tamkang University and earned a Ph.D. in international politics from the University of Virginia in the United States.

== Political career ==
Lin was elected to the Legislative Yuan for the first time in 1995, via the Chinese New Party's party list. He represented Taipei 2, for two terms from 2002 to 2008, first for the People First Party, before switching to the Kuomintang. Lin then won two elections from the single-member Taipei 5 constituency, serving through 2016.

=== 2008 legislative election ===
No.	Candidate	Party	Votes	Ratio	Elected
1	Ye Mei (葉玫)	Home Party	324	0.22%	
2	Wu Jian Yi (吳建毅)	Taiwan Farmers' Party	251	0.17%	
3	Wei Jhih Jhong (魏志中)	Independent	284	0.19%	
4	Lin Yu-fang	Kuomintang	87,448	58.23%	
5	Huang Ci Bin (黃啟彬)	Taiwan Constitution Association	360	0.24%	
6	Tuan Yi-kang	Democratic Progressive Party	61,480	40.95%	

=== 2016 legislative election ===
Taipei 5th Constituency 2016 Legislative Yuan Election
Candidate		Party	Votes	Percentage
Freddy Lim	林昶佐	New Power Party	82,650	49.52%
Lin Yu-fang	林郁方	Kuomintang	76,079	45.58%
You Jui-min	尤瑞敏	Trees Party	4,506	2.69%
Kung Wei-lun	龔偉綸	Independent	1,710	1.02%
Li Chia-hsin	李家幸	Taiwan Independence Party	885	0.53%
Huang Fu-liao	黃福卿	Independent	587	0.35%
Hung Hsien-cheng	洪顯政	Constitutional Conventions of Taiwan	478	0.28%
Source		Total	166,895	100%
