= Megaport Music Festival =

Music festival in Kaohsiung, Taiwan

Megaport Music Festival 大港開唱
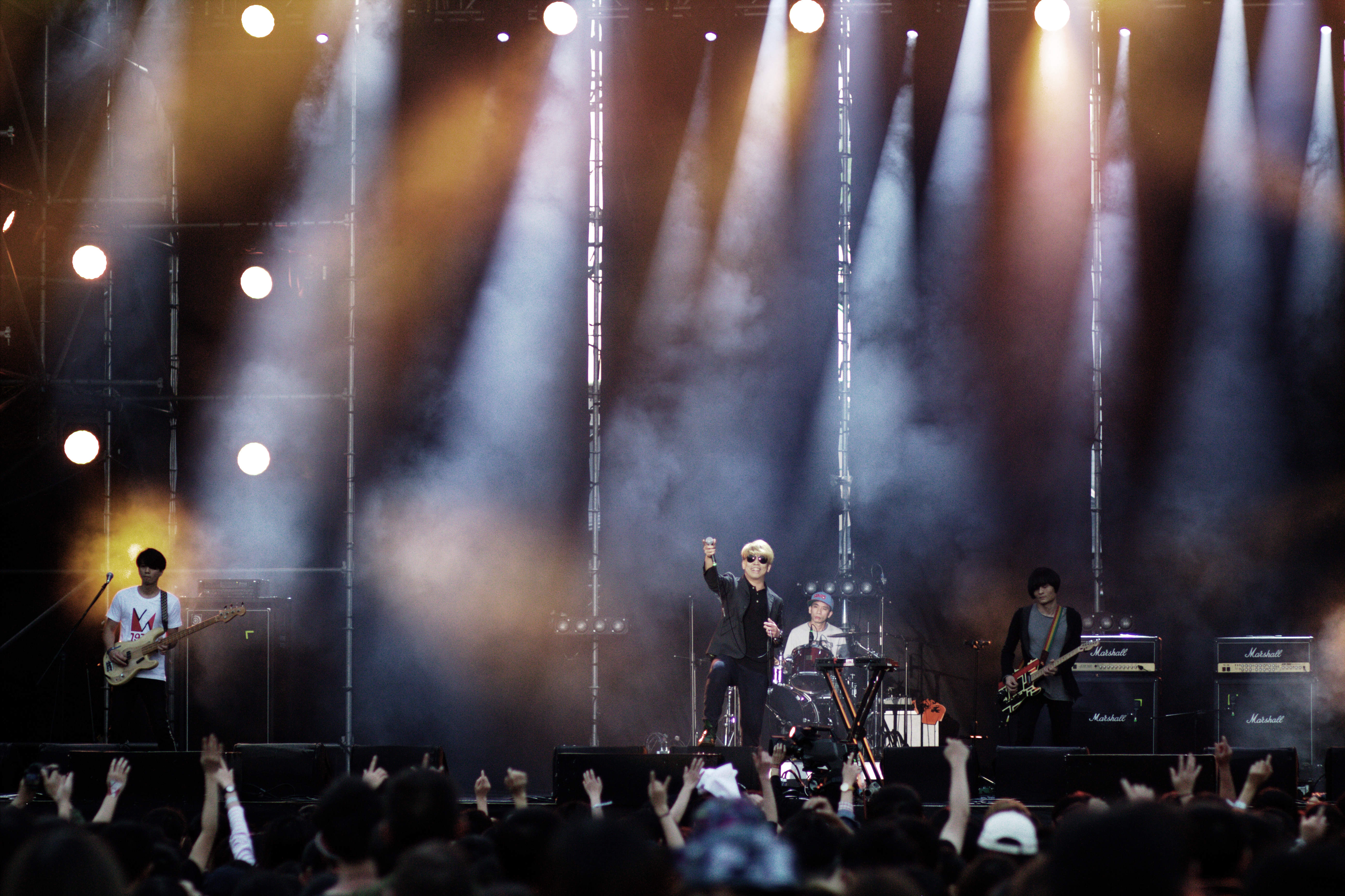
- 1976 performing at the Megaport Music Festival in 2016
- Genre: Rock and independent music
- Dates: Usually March
- Location: Kaohsiung
- Years active: 2006–present; not held in 2008, 2009, 2014, 2019, or 2020
- Founders: Taiwan Rock Alliance (Freddy Lim, Doris Yeh)
- Website: www.megaportfest.com

The Megaport Music Festival (Chinese: 大港開唱; pinyin: Dàgǎng Kāichàng; Pe̍h-ōe-jī: Tōa-káng khui-chhiùⁿ) has been held in Kaohsiung every year since 2006, with five exceptions.

== History ==
The music festival, founded in 2006 by Taiwan Rock Alliance, was co-organized from 2010 to 2012 by The Wall, a live house owned by Freddy Lim and based in Taipei, with branches in Yilan and Kaohsiung. The festival was planned with fans of rock music located in southern Taiwan in mind and has traditionally taken place in March, but has been held in other months throughout the year. Over time, Megaport grew in size and came to dominate the southern Taiwan music scene, no longer considered an "offshoot" of the older Formoz Festival.

The Megaport Music Festival was not held in 2014, due to a disputed takeover bid. The Wall's CEO bought out the other founders, one of whom was Freddy Lim, who claimed that the rights to the Formoz and Megaport Festivals had not changed hands. Lim managed to retain the rights to both music festivals, and both returned in 2015. The originally scheduled twelfth iteration of Megaport was cancelled in 2019, as the mayoral administration of Han Kuo-yu sought information on financing for the eleven previous festivals. After the recall of Han Kuo-yu and subsequent election of Chen Chi-mai, the festival was rescheduled for 2021. During the 2021 Megaport Music Festival, livestreamed performances were available. Chthonic, the metal band fronted by Lim, released a live album of their performance at the 2021 festival. The thirteenth edition of Megaport was held in early April 2022. Megaport 2023 was held on 1–2 April, with culture minister Shih Che in attendance. The following year, the festival returned to its regular schedule in late March. Boxers Kan Chia-wei and Huang Hsiao-wen were invited to perform at Megaport in 2025.

Megaport has featured many Taiwanese musicians, including Deserts Chang, Elephant Gym, 9m88, Fire EX., Enno Cheng, Huang Fei, 1976, and Sunset Rollercoaster as well as international groups, such as 65daysofstatic and Grizzly Bear. The festival has also been described as a significant platform for Taiwanese artists to express political views.
