= Port of Wilmington =

The Port of Wilmington may refer to:

- Port of Wilmington (Delaware), a port facility in Wilmington, Delaware, USA
- Port of Wilmington (North Carolina), a port facility in Wilmington, North Carolina, USA
- North Carolina International Port, an expansion of the Port of Wilmington facility near Southport, North Carolina, USA
