= Finland–Taiwan relations =

- Finland: Taiwan

Diplomatic mission
- Finland Trade Center in Taipei: Taipei Representative Office in Finland

Envoy
- Lauri Raunio: Freddy Lim

Finland–Taiwan relations are informal and largely economic, because the two countries do not have official diplomatic ties. On 13 January 1950, Finland acknowledged the People's Republic of China government in Beijing as the legitimate government of China, and diplomatic relations were established in October the same year. When referring to the country, the government of Finland tends to use the designation Taiwan instead of the official Republic of China.

A Taiwanese representative office was opened in Helsinki in 1990 and a corresponding Finnish office in Taipei a year later. These offices function as de facto embassies, as the countries have no formal diplomatic relations.

The Taipei Representative Office in Finland keeps relations with Finnish parliamentarians from various political parties. In May 2020, Taiwan donated 200,000 surgical masks to the Northern Finnish healthcare district, and they were received by Mikko Kärnä, who was the chair of the informal Taiwan friendship club of the Finnish parliament.

In 2005, under the term of Taipei representative in Finland Janet Chang, the Arrangement on Air Services between Taiwan and Finland was signed, indicating the potential for direct flights to operate between Taiwan and Finland in the future. Finland has also engaged in the Global Cooperation and Training Framework (GCTF) in Taiwan, which was initially initiated by Taiwan and the United States in 2015. Specifically, in 2024, the Finland Trade Centre in Taiwan co-hosted a GCTF event focused on strengthening civilian training to address resilience and emergency response in the face of climate change and other global challenges.

In 2025 heavy metal musician and politician Freddy Lim was appointed as the Taiwanese representative in Finland.

== Educational Cooperation ==
In 2026, Aalto University launches an EMBA program with National Central University in Taiwan.

== See also ==
- Foreign relations of Finland
- Foreign relations of Taiwan
