= Lin Kuo-cheng (born 1957) =

Taiwanese politician (born 1957)

Lin Kuo-cheng MLY
- 林國成
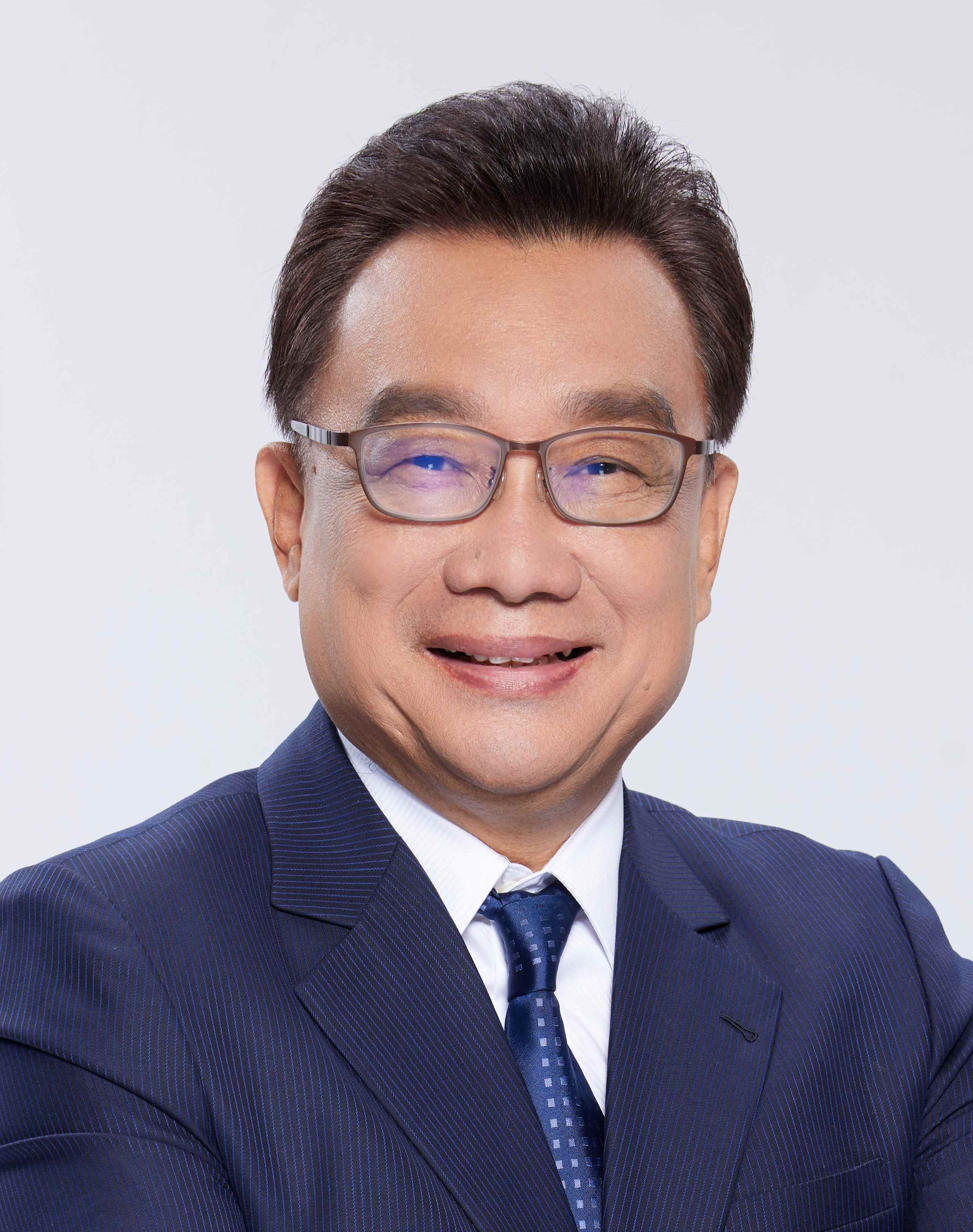
- Official portrait, 2024

Member of the Legislative Yuan
- In office 1 February 2024 – 1 February 2026
- Succeeded by: Chiu Hui-ju
- Constituency: Republic of China

Member of the Taipei City Council
- In office 10 September 2008 – 25 December 2022
- Constituency: District 4 (Zhongshan–Datong)

Personal details
- Born: 20 August 1957 (age 69) Pingtung County, Taiwan
- Party: Taiwan People's Party (since 2019)
- Other political affiliations: People First Party (2001–2019)
- Education: Chin Min Institute of Technology (BS); National Chengchi University (MA); TransWorld University (MS)

Lin Kuo-cheng (Chinese: 林國成; born 20 August 1957) is a Taiwanese politician. He was a member of the Taipei City Council between 2008 and 2022. He ran for the Legislative Yuan twice, in 2020 and 2024, winning the latter election.

== Early life and education ==
Lin was born on 20 August 1957 in Pingtung County, Taiwan. He was raised in Sanbu Village (三廍村) in Ligang Township, Pingtung. Lin was one of eight children in a poor family.

Lin graduated from Chin Min Institute of Technology. He later earned a master's degree in management from National Chengchi University. He also earned a degree in public relations and design from TransWorld University, and later also a master's degree in management from the same university.

== Political career ==
Lin served on the Taipei City Council from 2008 to 2022, and for most of his municipal tenure was affiliated with the People First Party. In 2018, Lin joined a group of several PFP and independent municipal councilor candidates, which later became the Taipei Supervising Alliance. Throughout that year, Ko Wen-je was seen at several of Lin's campaign events. Lin retained his Taipei City Council seat as a People First Party candidate in the year-end election.

Soon after Ko formally founded the Taiwan People's Party, Lin Kuo-cheng's daughter Lin Chen-yu was invited to serve as a party spokesperson. Lin Kuo-cheng also joined the party, and ran in the 2020 legislative election as a TPP party list candidate. He was not seated to the 10th Legislative Yuan. He ran again in the 2024 legislative election, and was elected as a TPP party list member of the 11th Legislative Yuan.

After the 11th Legislative Yuan was convened, Lin was the only TPP legislator considered for a committee co-chair position. However, the legislature's transportation committee selected Chen Hsueh-sheng and Lee Kun-tse. In line with TPP regulations, Lin announced his resignation from the Legislative Yuan in January 2026.

In February 2026, Lin was indicted for using profanity against President Lai Ching-te in a speech delivered on 25 July 2025.
