= Taipei City Constituency 5 =

Constituency of the Legislative Yuan of Taiwan

Taipei City Constituency V
- Single-member constituency for the Legislative Yuan
- District(s): Wanhua & parts of Zhongzheng

Current constituency
- Created: 2007
- Members: Lin Yu-fang (2008–2016); Freddy Lim (2016–2024); Wu Pei-yi (2024–)

Taipei City Constituency 5 (Chinese: 臺北市第五選舉區; pinyin: Táiběi Shì Dì-wǔ Xuǎnjǔ Qū) includes all of Wanhua and most of Zhongzheng in western Taipei. The district was created in 2008, when all local constituencies of the Legislative Yuan were reorganized to become single-member districts.

== Current district ==
- Wanhua
- Zhongzheng: 4 sub-districts
  - Nanmen: 5 urban villages
    - Nanmen, Aiguo, Longfu, Nanfu, Xinying
  - Dongmen: 7 urban villages
    - San'ai, Wenxiang, Xingfu, Meihua, Wenbei, Xingshi, Dongmen
  - Kanding: 6 urban villages
    - Yonggong, Zhongqin, Longguang, Yongchang, Sha'an, Longxing
  - Chengnei: 3 urban villages
    - Guangfu, Liming, Jianguo

== Legislators ==
Legislator for Taipei City Constituency V
| Parliament | Years | Member | Party |
Constituency split from Taipei City Constituency I
| 7th | 2008–2012 | Lin Yu-fang (林郁方) | Kuomintang |
| 8th | 2012–2016 | Lin Yu-fang (林郁方) | Kuomintang |
| 9th | 2016–2019¹ | Freddy Lim Chang-zuo (林昶佐) | New Power Party |
| 9th | 2019–2020 | Freddy Lim Chang-zuo (林昶佐) | Independent |
| 10th | 2020–2024 | Freddy Lim Chang-zuo (林昶佐) | Independent |
| 11th | 2024-present | Wu Pei-yi (吳沛憶) | Democratic Progressive Party |

Note: ^{1}Left party in 2019.

== Election results ==
=== 2008 ===
Legislative election 2008: Taipei City Constituency V
| Party | Candidate | Votes | % | ±% |
|---|---|---|---|---|
| KMT | Lin Yu-fang (林郁方) | 87,448 | 58.23 | |
| DPP | Tuan Yi-kang (段宜康) | 61,480 | 40.95 | |
| TCA | Huang Qibin (黃啟彬) | 360 | 0.24 | |
| Home | Ye Mei (葉玫) | 324 | 0.22 | |
| Independent | Wei Zhizhong (魏志中) | 284 | 0.19 | |
| Farmers | Wu Jianyi (吳建毅) | 251 | 0.17 | |
| Majority | | 25,968 | 17.28 | |
| Total valid votes | | 150,147 | 98.79 | |
| Rejected ballots | | 1,839 | 1.21 | |
| KMT win (new seat) | | | | |
| Turnout | | 151,986 | 63.69 | |
| Registered electors | | 238,616 | | |

=== 2012 ===
Legislative election 2012: Taipei City Constituency V
| Party | Candidate | Votes | % | ±% |
|---|---|---|---|---|
| KMT | Lin Yu-fang (林郁方) | 100,292 | 55.25 | ▼2.98 |
| DPP | Yan Sheng-guan (顏聖冠) | 77,013 | 42.43 | ▲1.48 |
| National Health Service Alliance | Chen Yanfu (陳彥甫) | 1,461 | 0.80 | New |
| Home | Ye Mei (葉玫) | 1,014 | 0.56 | ▲0.34 |
| Independent | Yang Jionghuang (楊烱煌) | 703 | 0.39 | New |
| Institutional Island of Saving the World | Liu Meijuan (劉美娟) | 572 | 0.32 | New |
| People's Democratic Party | Zhou Zhiwen (周志文) | 461 | 0.25 | New |
| Majority | | 23,279 | 12.82 | ▼4.46 |
| Total valid votes | | 181,516 | 98.26 | |
| Rejected ballots | | 3,208 | 1.74 | |
| KMT hold | | Swing | ▼2.23 | |
| Turnout | | 184,724 | 76.32 | ▲12.63 |
| Registered electors | | 242,041 | | |

=== 2016 ===
Legislative election 2016: Taipei City Constituency V
| Party | Candidate | Votes | % | ±% |
|---|---|---|---|---|
| NPP | Freddy Lim (林昶佐) | 82,650 | 49.52 | New |
| KMT | Lin Yu-fang (林郁方) | 76,079 | 45.58 | ▼9.67 |
| Trees | You Ruimin (尤瑞敏) | 4,506 | 2.70 | New |
| Independent | Gong Weilun (龔偉綸) | 1,710 | 1.02 | New |
| Taiwan Independence | Li Jiaxin (李家幸) | 885 | 0.53 | New |
| Independent | Huang Fuqing (黃福卿) | 587 | 0.35 | New |
| Constitutional Conventions of Taiwan | Hong Xianzheng (洪顯政) | 478 | 0.29 | New |
| Majority | | 6,571 | 3.94 | ▼8.88 |
| Total valid votes | | 166,895 | 98.15 | |
| Rejected ballots | | 3,151 | 1.85 | |
| NPP gain from KMT | | Swing | | |
| Turnout | | 170,046 | 68.33 | ▼7.99 |
| Registered electors | | 248,868 | | |

=== 2020 ===
Legislative election 2020: Taipei City Constituency V
| Party | Candidate | Votes | % | ±% |
|---|---|---|---|---|
| Independent | Freddy Lim (林昶佐) | 81,853 | 44.91 | ▼4.61 |
| KMT | Lin Yu-fang (林郁方) | 76,437 | 41.94 | ▼3.64 |
| Independent | Xu Li Xin (徐立信) | 22,208 | 12.19 | New |
| TAPA | Chiu Yifeng (邱一峰) | 551 | 0.30 | New |
| Independent | Lu Xianfu (盧憲孚) | 385 | 0.21 | New |
| DeafNation | Yang Jionghuang (楊烱煌) | 352 | 0.19 | New |
| Independent | Huang Yifeng (黃義豐) | 325 | 0.18 | New |
| Patriot Alliance Association | Chou Ching-chun (周慶峻) | 134 | 0.07 | New |
| Majority | | 5,416 | 2.97 | ▼0.97 |
| Total valid votes | | 182,245 | 98.45 | |
| Rejected ballots | | 2,878 | 1.55 | |
| Independent gain from NPP | | Swing | | |
| Turnout | | 185,123 | 75.64 | ▲7.31 |
| Registered electors | | 244,748 | | |

=== 2022 Recall Freddy Lim Election ===
9 January 2022 Recall Election: Taipei City Constituency V
| Choice | Votes | % |
|---|---|---|
| For | 54,813 | 55.84 |
| Against | 43,340 | 44.16 |
| Total | 98,153 | 100.00 |
| Valid votes | 98,153 | 99.60 |
| Invalid/blank votes | 396 | 0.40 |
| Total votes | 98,549 | 100.00 |
| Registered voters/turnout | 235,024 | 41.93 |
| Turnout needed | | 50.00 |

=== 2024 ===
Legislative Election 2024: Taipei City Constituency V
| Party | Candidate | Votes | % | ±% |
|---|---|---|---|---|
| DPP | Wu Pei-yi (吳沛憶) | 66,932 | 39.81 | New |
| KMT | Chung Hsiao-Ping (鍾小平) | 57,634 | 34.28 | ▼7.66 |
| Independent | Yu Belle (于美人) | 38,913 | 23.14 | New |
| Judicial Reform Party | Lee Hwey-Chyi (李慧曦) | 1,502 | 0.89 | New |
| Independent | Sun Chih-Li (孫智麗) | 1,489 | 0.89 | New |
| Economic Party | Su Zheng (蘇諍) | 472 | 0.28 | New |
| Independent | Chen Can (陳燕玉) | 194 | 0.12 | New |
| United Action Alliance | Hsu Ginming (許敬民) | 174 | 0.10 | New |
| Independent | Lin Zhi Cheng (林志成) | 138 | 0.08 | New |
| Majority | | 9,298 | 5.53 | ▲2.56 |
| Total valid votes | | 168,140 | 98.17 | |
| Rejected ballots | | 3,142 | 1.83 | |
| DPP gain from Independent | | Swing | | |
| Turnout | | 171,282 | 73.22 | ▼2.42 |
| Registered electors | | 233,914 | | |
