= Yu Meiren =

Yu Meiren may refer to:

Written as 于美人

- Belle Yu (born 1965), Taiwanese politician who lost to Wu Pei-yi in 2024

Written as 魚美人

- The Mermaid (1965 film), a 1965 Hong Kong film

Written as 虞美人

- Beautiful Lady Yu (Han dynasty) (died 179 AD), Emperor Shun of Han's consort and Emperor Chong's mother
- Consort Yu (Xiang Yu's wife) (died 202 BCE), Xiang Yu's wife
- Yu Meiren, a standard template of the Chinese poetry ci
