= Taipei Representative Office, Helsinki =

Taipei Representative Office in Finland 駐芬蘭臺北代表處
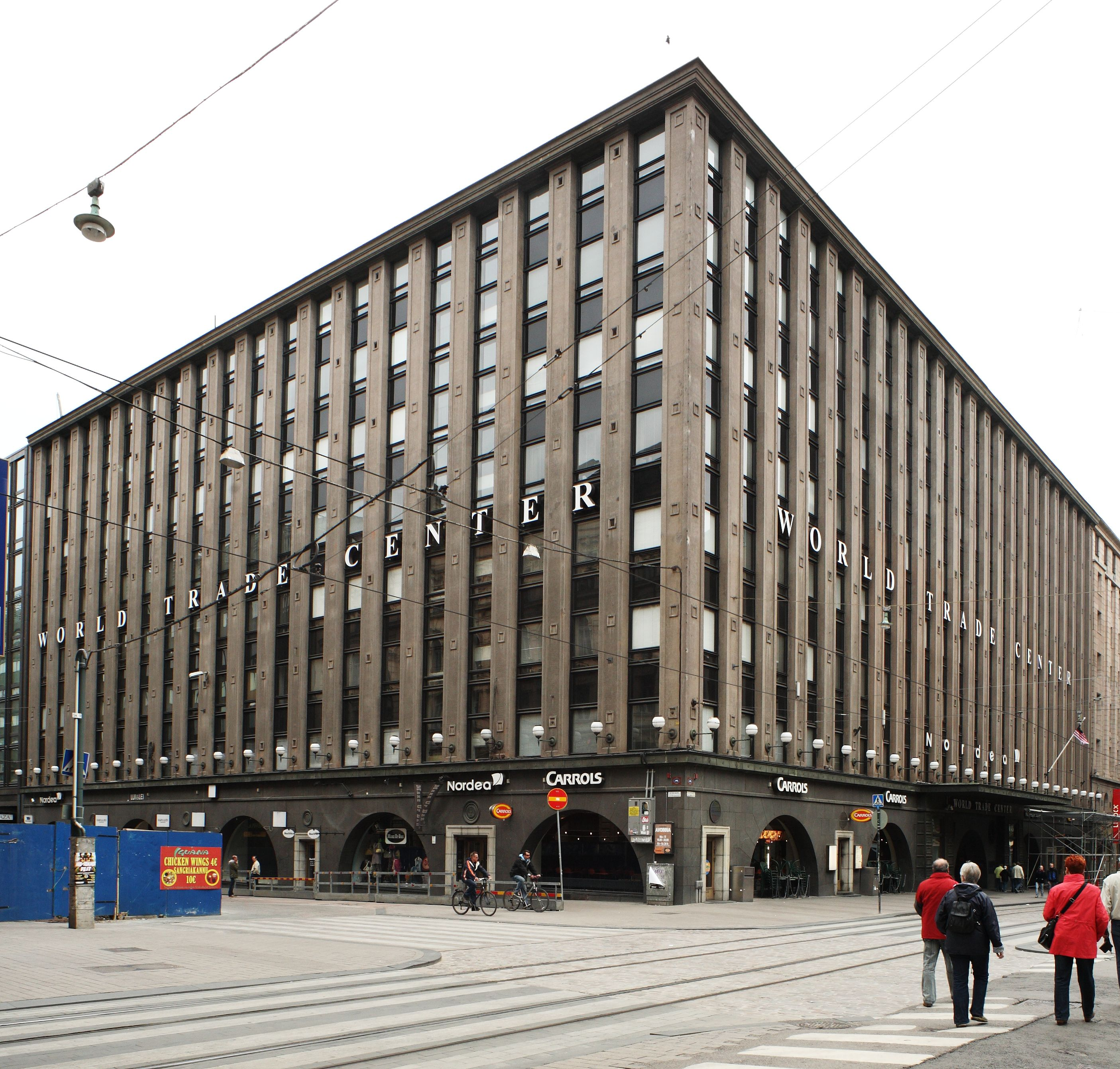
- WTC Helsinki building where the representative office is located
- Location: Helsinki, Finland
- Address: Aleksanterinkatu 17, 4th Floor, 00100 Helsinki
- Ambassador: Lim Tshiong-tso
- Website: www.roc-taiwan.org/fi

The Taipei Representative Office in Finland (Chinese: 駐芬蘭臺北代表處; Finnish: Taipein Helsingin yhteystoimisto) is the de facto Taiwanese embassy in Finland. In Finnish it is officially called yhteystoimisto (lit. 'liaison office') as the two countries do not have formal diplomatic ties.

The aim of the representative office is to further Finland–Taiwan relations in the fields of economics, culture, education and research. In addition it offers consular services.

The representative office was opened in 1990. A year later a similar office from Finland's side opened in Taipei. The representative office of Helsinki is located at Aleksanterinkatu 17 in the World Trade Center building.
