= Freddy Lim =

Taiwanese politician and musician

Lim Tshiong-tso MLY
- 林昶佐
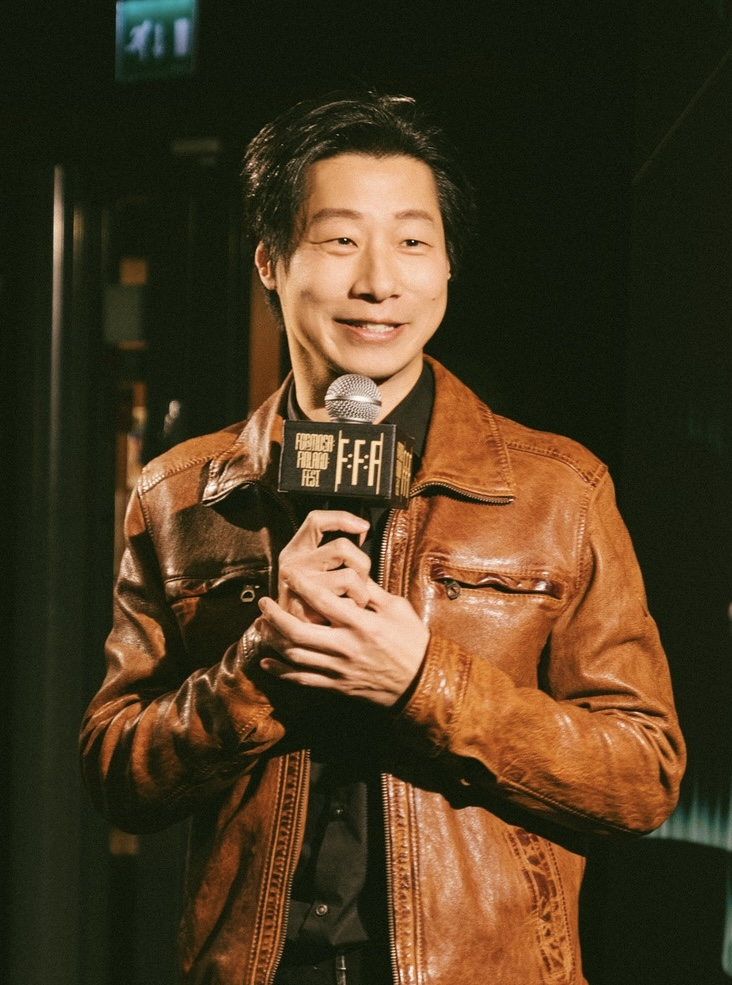
- Lim in 2025

5th Representative of Taiwan to Finland
- Incumbent
- Assumed office 20 July 2025
- President: Lai Ching-te
- Preceded by: Janet Chang

Member of the Legislative Yuan
- In office 1 February 2016 – 31 January 2024
- Preceded by: Lin Yu-fang
- Succeeded by: Wu Pei-yi
- Constituency: Taipei City V

1st Leader of the New Power Party
- In office 25 January 2015 – 2 July 2015
- Preceded by: Position established
- Succeeded by: Huang Kuo-chang

Personal details
- Born: 1 February 1976 (age 50) Taipei, Taiwan
- Party: Democratic Progressive Party (since 2023)
- Other political affiliations: New Power Party (2015–2019); Independent (2019–2023)
- Spouse: Doris Yeh
- Education: National Taipei University (BA)
- Musical career
- Genres: Blackened death metal; melodic death metal; symphonic black metal; folk metal; Oriental metal
- Instruments: Vocals; erhu
- Label: Spinefarm (Universal Music)
- Member of: Chthonic

Chinese name
- Traditional Chinese: 林昶佐
Transcriptions
Standard Mandarin
- Hanyu Pinyin: Lín Chǎngzuǒ
- Bopomofo: ㄌㄧㄣˊㄔㄤˇㄗㄨㄛˇ
Yue: Cantonese
- Yale Romanization: Làhm Chóng-jo
- Jyutping: Lam^{4} Cong^{2}-zo^{3}
Southern Min
- Hokkien POJ: Lîm Chhióng-chò
- Tâi-lô: Lîm Tshióng-tsò

Lim Tshiong-tso (Chinese: 林昶佐; pinyin: Lín Chǎngzuǒ; Tâi-lô: Lîm Tshióng-tsò; born 1 February 1976), known also by his English name Freddy, is a Taiwanese politician and musician, currently serving as the Representative of Taiwan to Finland since 2025. He is the lead vocalist of the Taiwanese heavy-metal band Chthonic and the lead vocalist of the band Metal Clone X started by him and American guitarist Marty Friedman.

Lim served as chair of Amnesty International Taiwan from 2010 to 2014. He was one of the founding leaders of the New Power Party (NPP) in Taiwan and represented the party in the Legislative Yuan until 2019. Lim won a second legislative term as an independent in 2020.

== Early life and music career ==
Lim was an ardent supporter of Chinese unification as a student, because he was taught from China-centric textbooks in middle school and high school. A diagnosis of anxiety in middle school made him ineligible for military duty. Lim formed Chthonic in 1995, during his second year of university, when he began identifying more strongly with his Taiwanese identity.

Often known simply as Freddy in Taiwan, Lim chose to name himself after Freddy Krueger. On stage, Lim is known as "Left Face of Maradou" and wore corpse paint portraying the Ba-Jia-Jiang in performances until 2011, when the band ended their use of corpse paint.

With fellow Chthonic member and wife Doris Yeh, Lim started the Taiwan Rock Alliance, and as co-founder of The Wall, helped organize two music festivals, Formoz and Megaport. Lim's stake in The Wall was bought out in 2012, and amid the resulting dispute, both festivals were cancelled in 2014. They returned in the next year, organized by Lim's Taiwan Rock Alliance. The Taiwan Rock Alliance has also put on a separate concert since 2000. Originally named Say No to China, the concert occurs some time around the anniversary of the February 28 incident. It then used the name Say Yes to Taiwan until 2007, when it was renamed again to Spirit of Taiwan.

Lim was elected to lead Amnesty International Taiwan in 2010 and stepped down in 2014.

Chthonic was billed to play on the second day of the 2018 On the Pulse of Music Festival, but the performance had to be cancelled because Hong Kong Immigration Department refused to grant Lim a visa. Although the Immigration Department says it does not comment on individual cases, the rejection letter was published by the group's local sponsor, Goomusic. In the letter, officials stated that a person seeking to enter Hong Kong for employment "should, amongst other things, possess a special skill, knowledge or experience of value to and not readily available in the HKSAR", and that the immigration Department was not satisfied that Lim met the criteria. Commentator Stephen Vines questioned the black box operation of an unaccountable bureaucracy, saying it was "no wonder this sort of nonsense was not intended to be made public, otherwise questions might well be asked about whether the newfound musical expertise of the bureaucrats was going to apply to all the very large number of other musicians playing gigs in Hong Kong".

In 2020, he started an English podcast with Taiwanese journalist Emily Y. Wu called Metalhead Politics to direct international attention to Taiwan's political issues.

== Entry into politics ==
In January 2015, Lim founded the New Power Party. The next month Lim declared his candidacy for the 2016 elections, aiming to contest the Daan District legislative seat held by Kuomintang incumbent Chiang Nai-shin. A few weeks later, Lim ceded the race to Social Democratic Party candidate Fan Yun, choosing instead to run against incumbent Kuomintang legislator Lin Yu-fang in the Zhongzheng–Wanhua constituency. The Democratic Progressive Party did not nominate candidates in the constituency, choosing to support Lim, who defeated Lin in the elections held on 16 January 2016. Lim was assigned to the Foreign and National Defense Committee (FNDC) after taking office. In October, Lim announced the formation of a Tibet caucus in the Legislative Yuan, with himself as caucus leader.

Taipei City Constituency 5 in the 2016 Legislative Yuan election
| Candidate | | Party | Votes | Percentage |
|---|---|---|---|---|
| Freddy Lim | 林昶佐 | New Power Party | 82,650 | 49.52% |
| Lin Yu-fang | 林郁方 | Kuomintang | 76,079 | 45.58% |
| You Jui-min | 尤瑞敏 | Trees Party | 4,506 | 2.69% |
| Kung Wei-lun | 龔偉綸 | Independent | 1,710 | 1.02% |
| Li Chia-hsin | 李家幸 | Taiwan Independence Party | 885 | 0.53% |
| Huang Fu-liao | 黃福卿 | Independent | 587 | 0.35% |
| Hung Hsien-cheng | 洪顯政 | Constitutional Conventions of Taiwan | 478 | 0.28% |
| Source | | Total | 166,895 | 100% |

On 3 October 2018 during the FNDC session, Lim proposed to re-examine the 1987 Lieyu massacre files in the military archive to render a formal apology to the victims' families through the Vietnamese Representative Office, but Minister of National Defence, General Yen Teh-fa disagreed, claiming that troops followed the standard operating procedure in effect during martial law, and have been court-martialed; later the Ministry of National Defense issued a written response stating that the case "could not be processed further, as it is too difficult to identify the deceased after so much time has passed," which serve as the sole statement of the ROC government for the massacre in 31 years after martial law was lifted in 1987.

In August 2019, Lim announced that he would leave the New Power Party to support Tsai Ing-wen in the 2020 Taiwan presidential election. Lim also stated that he would run for legislative reelection as a political independent. He won reelection in January 2020, defeating Lin Yu-fang for a second time.

The Central Election Commission announced on 10 August 2021 that a petition to recall Lim had gathered enough support, one percent of the eligible electorate in his constituency, to pass the first stage. On 3 December 2021, the CEC announced that the recall movement against Lim garnered 27,362 valid signatures, more than the ten percent threshold required in the second stage to trigger a recall election. Lim's recall election was held on 9 January 2022, the same day as the replacement vote for Taichung's 2nd legislative district, where Chen Po-wei lost a recall vote in October 2021. Supporters of the recall effort have criticized Lim for his response to the COVID-19 pandemic in his district. A total of 218 polling stations were open during the recall vote. Although votes to recall Lim outnumbered votes against Lim's recall, low turnout meant that the result was not binding.

Lim announced in March 2023 that he did not plan to contest the 2024 Taiwanese legislative election, citing the need to care for an ill relative. On 27 November 2023 he announced that he would join the Democratic Progressive Party (DPP), at the urging of Vice President and DPP presidential candidate Lai Ching-te.

In May 2025, Lim was named the Taiwanese representative to Finland.

== Political stances ==
Lim favors the abolition of capital punishment, and supports the legalization of same-sex marriage and marijuana use in Taiwan.

Party political offices
| Preceded by New office | Captain of New Power Party; 25 January 2015 – 2 July 2015 | Succeeded by Huang Kuo-chang |
