= Doris Yeh =

Taiwanese female musician

Yeh Hsiang-yi
- 葉湘怡
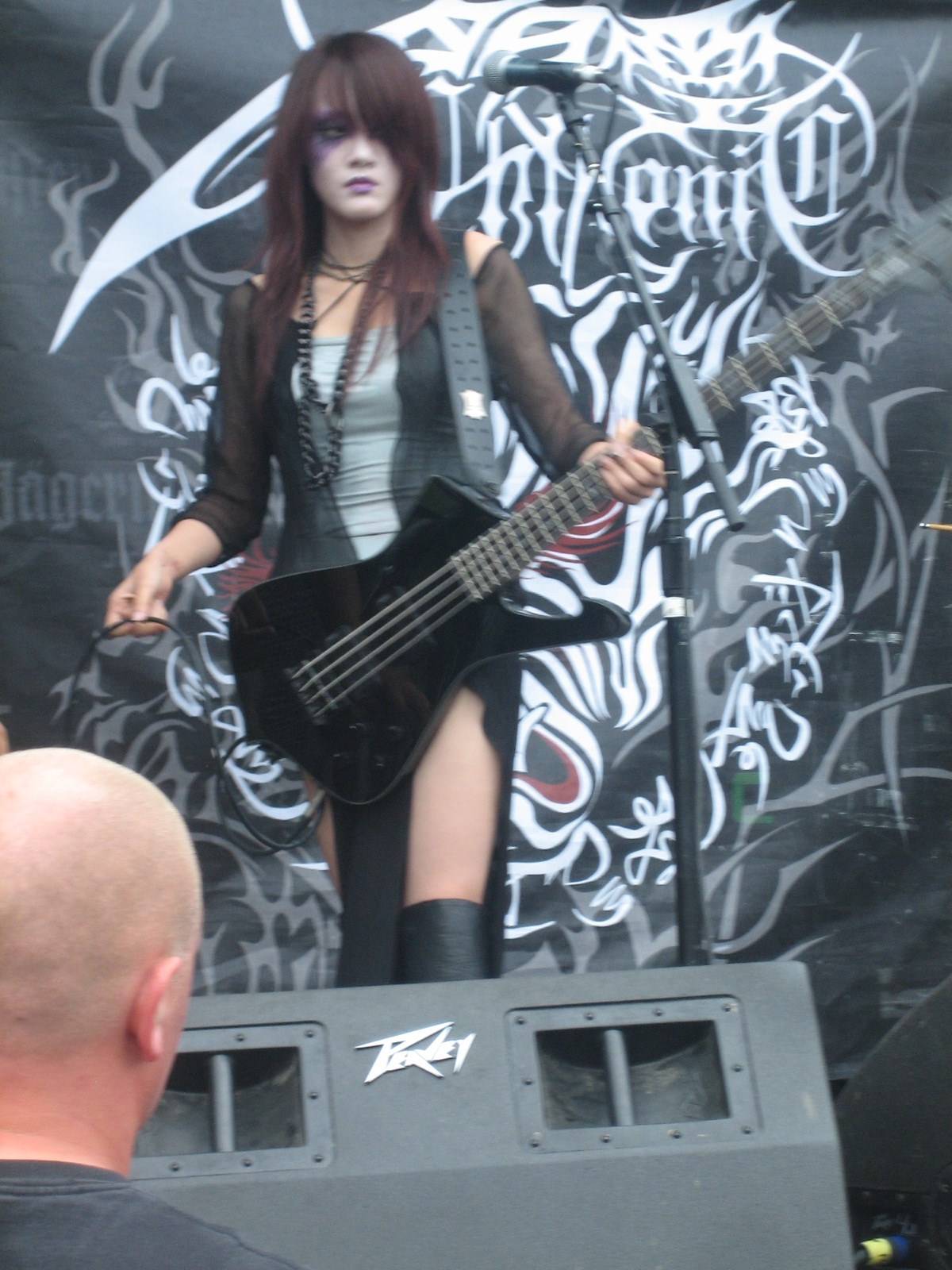
- Born: 18 September 1977 (age 48); Taipei, Taiwan
- Education: National Taipei University
- Spouse: Freddy Lim
- Musical career
- Genres: Blackened death metal; melodic death metal; symphonic black metal; folk metal; Oriental metal
- Instruments: Bass guitar
- Label: Spinefarm (Universal Music)
- Member of: Chthonic (1999-present)

Yeh Hsiang-yi (Chinese: 葉湘怡; born 18 September 1977), popularly known by her English name Doris Yeh, is a Taiwanese musician. She has been the bass guitarist for the Taiwanese heavy metal band Chthonic since 1999.

== Musical career ==
Yeh learned to play the piano at the age of six. She then learned the bass guitar, as her father was a bassist. She joined Chthonic in 1999 as a replacement for Xiao-Yu. Chthonic later gained worldwide recognition, and have been called "the Black Sabbath of Asia."

In 2009, a readers' poll in Terrorizer magazine named Yeh no. 2 for best bass player. Her bandmate Freddy Lim also received a high rating in the poll, making Chthonic the only band in which multiple members made the top ten in their respective categories.

Yeh became the band's spokesperson and business manager in about 2009, taking over roles performed by Lim since the band's formation in 1995. Yeh has since earned a great amount of publicity, speaking about the band's political beliefs in magazines like Monocle in the United Kingdom, Metropolis in Japan, and Cacao in Taiwan. In addition, Yeh has endorsed the Awakening Foundation, a women's rights organization in Taiwan. In February 2009, Lim and Yeh protested with human rights activists at the Taipei zoo panda exhibit, which symbolizes China's attempts to establish soft power relations with Taiwan.

Yeh has also been recognized as a model and sex symbol, appearing on the cover of the Taiwanese version of Body magazine and regularly being selected as one of the sexiest women in music by Revolver and the Taiwanese version of FHM.

== Personal life ==
Yeh is married to Freddy Lim. Their first child was born in March 2017.
