= Chiu Hui-ju =

Taiwanese nurse scientist and politician (born 1974)

Chiu Hui-ju MLY
- 邱慧洳
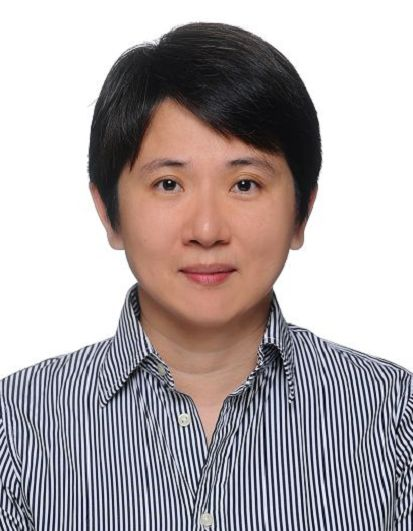
- Official portrait, 2026

Member of the Legislative Yuan
- Incumbent
- Assumed office 3 February 2026
- Preceded by: Lin Kuo-cheng
- Constituency: Republic of China

Personal details
- Born: 12 January 1974 (age 52)
- Party: Taiwan People's Party
- Education: Emory University (BS); University of South Alabama (MSN); Yale University (DNS); Soochow University (LLM); National Chengchi University (PhD)

Chiu Hui-ju (Chinese: 邱慧洳; born 12 January 1974) is a Taiwanese nurse scientist and politician. She is a professor at the National Taipei University of Nursing and Health Science's General Education Center.

Chiu was placed on the Taiwan People's Party proportional representation party list during the 2024 legislative election, and participated in the inaugural televised policy presentations for at-large legislative candidates. Chiu was not elected to the Legislative Yuan, but succeeded Lin Kuo-cheng in February 2026, who resigned due to the TPP's two-year term limit for legislators. She was formally sworn into office on 3 February 2026. In May 2026, Chiu was the sole TPP member of a legislative delegation that visited France and the United Kingdom.

== Early life and education ==
Chiu was born on 12 January 1974. She graduated from Emory University in the United States with a Bachelor of Science in Nursing. She then earned a master's degree in nursing from the University of South Alabama. In 2003, she earned her Doctor of Nursing Science (D.N.S.) from Yale University, where she was a doctoral student at the Yale School of Nursing. Her dissertation was titled, The Effects of Parental Influences and Developmental Characteristics on Adolescents' Adherence and Health Status in Type 1 Diabetes.

Chiu later earned a master's degree in law from Soochow University. She passed the court clerk examination in 2009 and the bar examination in 2011. In 2022, she earned a second doctorate, a Ph.D. in law, from National Chengchi University. Her 604-page doctoral dissertation was titled, Civil Liabilities for Damage Resulting from Nursing Interventions Implemented by Medical Institutions, Nursing Homes, Postpartum Care Centers and their Nurses. Her doctoral advisor was Wang Chien-wei.
