= Wu Pei-yi =

Taiwanese politician (born 1987)

Wu Pei-yi MLY
- 吳沛憶
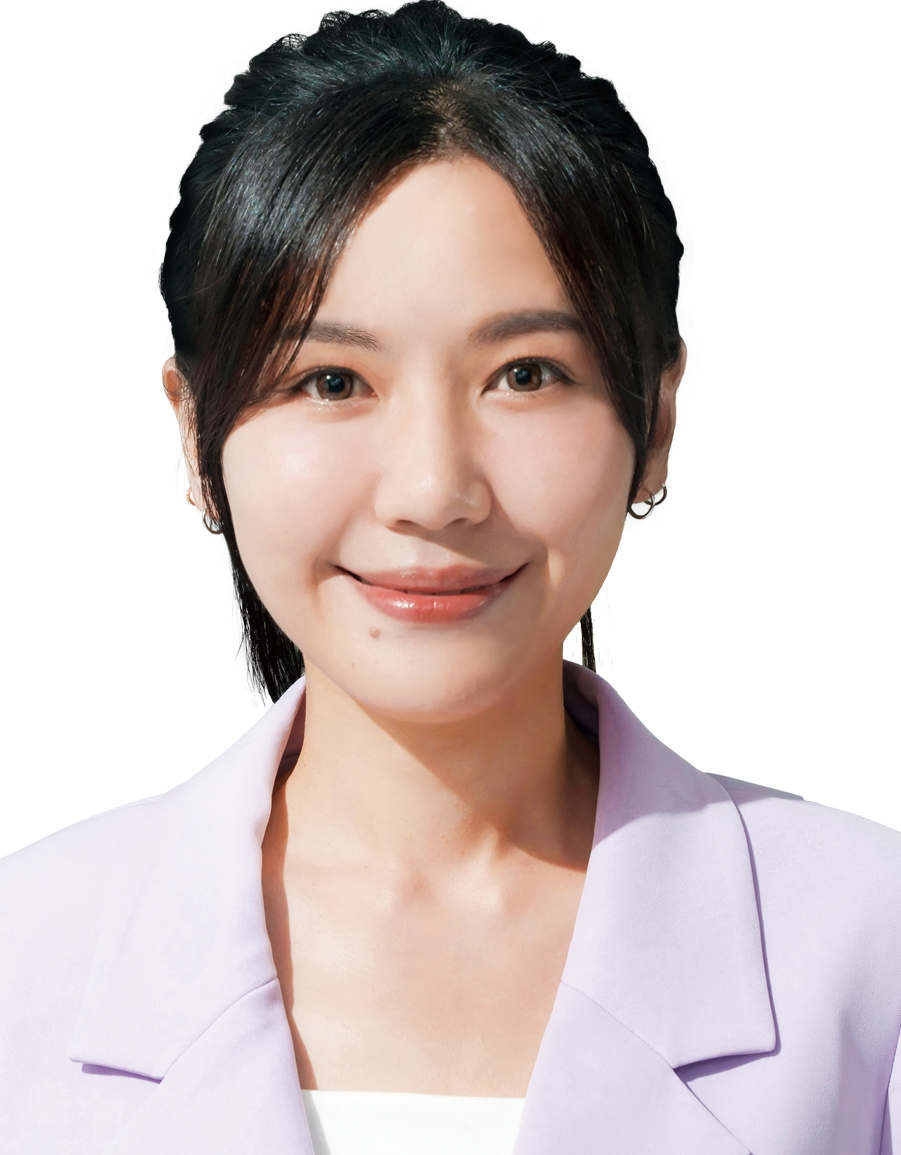
- Official portrait, 2024

Member of the Legislative Yuan
- Incumbent
- Assumed office 1 February 2024
- Preceded by: Freddy Lim
- Constituency: Taipei City V

Taipei City Councillor
- In office 25 December 2018 – 31 January 2024
- Constituency: District 5 (Zhongzheng–Wanhua)

Personal details
- Born: 20 January 1987 (age 39) Keelung, Taiwan
- Party: Democratic Progressive Party (since 2014)
- Education: National Taiwan University (BA); National Tsing Hua University (MA)

Chinese name
- Traditional Chinese: 吳沛憶
Transcriptions
Standard Mandarin
- Hanyu Pinyin: Wú Pèiyì
- Bopomofo: ㄨˊㄆㄟˋㄧˋ
- Wade–Giles: Wu2 Pei4 yi4
Yue: Cantonese
- Jyutping: Ng4 pui3 jik1
Southern Min
- Hokkien POJ: Ngô͘ Phài-ek

Wu Pei-yi (Chinese: 吳沛憶; born 20 January 1987) is a Taiwanese politician. She served on the Taipei City Council from 2018 to 2024, when she was elected to the Legislative Yuan.

== Education and activism ==
Wu graduated from National Taiwan University (NTU) with a B.A. in political science in 2009. She began participating in the Dalawasao Club, a student organization that could trace its history back to the 1988 farmers' rights protest in Taiwan, but had just been re-established in her first year as a student, ending approximately a decade of inactivity. During her time at NTU, Wu participated in the Wild Strawberries Movement. After completing her undergraduate degree, she pursued master's studies at National Tsing Hua University (NTHU). At NTHU, she was introduced to undergraduate student Chen Wei-ting, and participated in the anti-media monopoly movement between 2012 and 2013. (Note: For reference material discussing the Anti-Media Monopoly Movement, see Rawnsley, Ming-Yeh T.; Feng, Chien-san (September 2014). "Anti-media-monopoly policies and further democratisation in Taiwan". Journal of Current Chinese Affairs. 43 (3). Ebsworth, Rowena (2017). "Not Wanting Want: The Anti-Media Monopoly Movement in Taiwan". In Fell, Dafydd (ed.). Taiwan's Social Movements under Ma Ying-jeou. Routledge. ISBN 9781138675674. "The Anti-Media Monopoly Movement". New Bloom Magazine. 25 July 2017.) After Wu obtained her master's degree, she began working for the Thinking Taiwan Foundation. Approximately six months later, ratification of the Cross-Strait Service Trade Agreement was being discussed, and Wu took leave from the Thinking Taiwan Foundation to participate in what became the Sunflower Student Movement.

== Political career ==
=== Party positions ===
Wu joined the Democratic Progressive Party in 2014, the same year that Tsai Ing-wen began her second term as party leader, and is regarded as close to Tsai. During her first year as a DPP member, Wu served as deputy director of the DPP-affiliated Democracy Institute. She later became a spokesperson for the party, speaking on cross-Strait relations, 2018 local election plans, and same-sex marriage.

=== Taipei City Council ===
As a candidate during the 2018 local election cycle, Wu faced Yu Tian's daughter Yu Shiao-ping in a party primary, and won the Zhongzheng–Wanhua seat in the Taipei City Council that November. In March 2019, Wu accused Ko Wen-je of ageism, after he defended statements on the political status of Taiwan made by Huang Ching-yin. In October 2019, Wu expressed concerns about the privacy of personal information and the proposed installation of smart vending machines in Taipei schools. That same year, Wu joined an alliance to promote gender equality and LGBT rights in Taiwan, as well as a Tibet caucus, both formed by her fellow councillors. In 2020, she expressed support for Taipei's Showa Building to be named a cultural heritage site. The following year, Wu criticized the Taipei City Government for its handling of a COVID-19 outbreak linked to markets operated by the Taipei Agricultural Products Marketing Company and advocated for increased oversight of scooter sharing in the city. In January 2022, Wu joined Miao Po-ya's petition against Ko Wen-je's proposal to link the Taipei Pass to COVID-19-related personal information, and stressed the right to privacy. Months later, in further defense of privacy rights, Wu and Miao drew attention to the Taipei City Government giving helpline call recordings to a private artificial intelligence company. In October, Wu disclosed that Ko and former deputy mayor Huang Shan-shan had used money from a second reserve fund and from fifteen city departments to pay for the 2022 Taipei Expo, and called on the pair to apologize. After reports of sexual misconduct affecting Democratic Progressive Party employees came to light in 2023, Wu co-signed a statement offering support, including free legal aid, to the victims.

=== Legislative Yuan ===
Following Freddy Lim's retirement from the Legislative Yuan, Wu received the Democratic Progressive Party's nomination to contest the Taipei 5 seat held by Lim. After Wu was named the nominee over Ili Cheng, Wu joined a coalition of young candidates known as "The Generation". Of this group, she was the only one to win election, in a ten-person race with 39.81% of the vote. Kuomintang candidate Chung Hsiao-ping (34.3%) and political independent Belle Yu (23.1%), finished second and third, respectively. This was the largest field of candidates in any legislative district during the 2024 election.

== Personal life ==
Both of Wu's parents are elementary schoolteachers. She was born on 20 January 1987 in Keelung.
