= Deserts Chang =

Taiwanese singer-songwriter

- 張懸
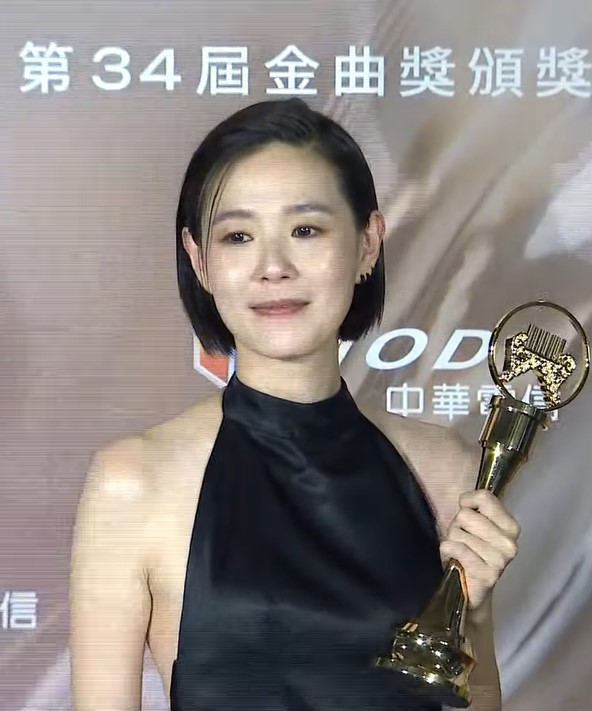
- Chang in 2023
- Born: Chiao An-p'u (焦安溥); 30 May 1981 (age 45); Taiwan
- Occupation: Singer-songwriter
- Years active: 2001–2015 (Deserts Chang); 2015–present (Anpu)
- Musical career
- Genres: Indie pop, alternative
- Instruments: Vocals, guitar
- Label: Sony BMG (2006–2012)
- Website: anpu-oystermusic.com

Deserts Chang, born Chiao An-p'u (Chinese: 焦安溥; pinyin: Jiāo Ānpǔ; born 30 May 1981), is a Taiwanese singer-songwriter, known for her poetic lyrics and social commentary. She won Best Lyricist at the 24th Golden Melody Awards in 2013 for her song "Rose-Colored You" (玫瑰色的你), and Song of the Year at the 34th Golden Melody Awards in 2023 for "A Flash and How It Lasts" (最好的時光).

== Name ==
Chang rose to fame in the Chinese-speaking world under the stage name Chang Hsüan (張懸), originally a pen name she had adopted in high school when she began writing poetry and contributing to newspaper supplements. Hsüan in her stage name represents something "mysterious and suggests something hanging in limbo." Following her "To Ebb" concert in Kaohsiung in 2015, she announced that she would retire the stage name and has since continued her artistic work under her given name, Anpu (安溥).

== Career ==
Chang was born to a prominent family; her father Chiao Jen-ho (焦仁和; Jiāo Rénhé), served as secretary-general of the Straits Exchange Foundation.

Chang began composing music at the age of 13 and gave her first stage performance at 16. By 19, she had written more than 100 songs and signed a contract with Sony BMG, though the release of her debut album was delayed for several years. During this period, she dropped out of high school, explaining that she "couldn't stand the conservative restrictions," and built a following through performances in pubs, live houses, and on online platforms. A guitarist, she writes most of her songs on acoustic guitar.

In the early 2000s, Chang was the vocalist for the rock band Mango Runs, which was named Most Popular Act and won the Indie Music Award at the 2003 Hohaiyan Rock Festival in Taipei County. The band was also featured in the 2004 documentary Ocean Fever (海洋熱), which chronicled several acts at the festival.

Chang's debut album My Life Will… was released on 9 June 2006 under Sony BMG, featuring material she had written between the ages of 13 and 19. Despite concerns from fans about her signing with a major label, she stated that her musical style would remain unchanged. The album received four nominations at the 18th Golden Melody Awards, including Best Mandarin Album, placing her alongside mainstream artists such as Jolin Tsai. At the time, it was considered unusual for independent-leaning artists to receive nominations in the ceremony's major categories. The same year, she won Best New Mandarin Artist at the 7th Chinese Music Media Awards in Hong Kong.

Her second album, Oh, dear. dear. I haven't. (親愛的...我還不知道), was released on 20 July 2007. The song "畢竟" earned her a nomination for Best Lyricist at the 19th Golden Melody Awards. She later formed the band Algae with musicians Cent, Goodtone, and Sunho, releasing her third album City (城市) on 22 May 2009.

In August 2012, she released her fourth album Games We Play (神的遊戲) under Sony Music, which drew from her life experiences of the preceding three years and reflected her ongoing engagement with social issues. The album included "玫瑰色的你" ("Rose-Colored You"), for which she won Best Lyricist at the 24th Golden Melody Awards.

== Controversy ==
In November 2013, during her Games We Play tour concert in Manchester, Chang accepted a Republic of China (Taiwan) flag from a student in the audience, held it up on stage, and remarked in both Chinese and English that she was from Taiwan. When a Chinese student in the audience shouted in English, "No politics today!", Chang replied: "It's just a flag. It shows where I come from. Why do you have to make it about politics?" The incident sparked controversy in mainland China. After returning to Taiwan, Chang posted an explanation on Facebook, writing: "The flag, pineapple cakes, Taiwanese rice, high mountain tea and traditional characters—all of these are the same to me. They represent where I come from. Whenever I see them, I feel gratitude, recognition and longing." She added: "My recognition and joy in seeing the flag was never meant to disparage the values of those with different views. The way I share it with foreign audiences is the same way I share it with any Chinese audience, without a trace of mockery or disrespect." The episode led to restrictions on her performances in mainland China, where she did not appear again until 2018, when she performed in Hangzhou.

On October 1, 2024, China's National Day, Chang's management company, United Entertainment, posted a handwritten message on Weibo that read: "Blessings on the 75th anniversary of the founding of New China, may the people live in harmony and peace prevail everywhere," signed "Blessings from Anpu."

== Personal life ==
Chang dated actor Chang Han, the elder brother of Chang Chen, for eight months in 2010. In 2011, she began a relationship with theatre director Li Chang-jian (李常建); the relationship lasted five years. In 2019, she married Oliver Po-wei Su (蘇柏維), founder of the visual effects company Organic Pixels, and gave birth to their son in the same year. They divorced in 2022.

== Discography ==
=== Studio albums ===
Year	Album
2005	Maybe I Don't Care: 31 March Indie Release; Live House Limited Edition
2006	My Life Will...: 9 June Released by Sony BMG
2007	Dear... I don't know yet: 20 July Released by Sony BMG
2009	The City: 22 May Released by Sony BMG (in Taiwan); 22 May Released by Sony BMG (in China); Released under band name:"Algae"
2012	Games We Play: 11 August Released by Sony BMG
2022	9522: 14 October; Released under name: "anpu" (安溥)

=== EP ===
Year	Name
2007	《Baby in life》: 8 June Released by Sony BMG
2008	《Love, New Year》: 19 December Released by Sony BMG as a form of Greeting Card, Limited 5000 Cards were released

=== Soundtrack appearances ===
Year	Title
September 2005	《The Passage》MovieSoundtrack Theme Song: 〈"Glimmer"〉 (Producer)
August 2008	《Candy Rain》MovieSoundtrack: 〈"Triste"〉 (Singer/ Producer)
February 2010	《Monga》MovieSoundtrack: 〈"I think you're leaving"〉 (Singer/ Producer)

== Tours and performances ==
- Spring Scream
- Formoz Festival
- The Wall Live House─Cat Power Warm Up
- Hohaiyan Rock Festival
- Modern Sky Festival
- In Music Festival
- S.H.E Top Girl Concert (Guests)
- Taiwan Music Night at Nouveau Casino, Paris, France
- Sodagreen「Walk Together」Concert Tour 2012 (Guest)
- Fuji Rock Festival フジロック 2012, Naeba, Japan
- Deserts ＆ Algae To Ebb Tour 2014–2015
- Taiwanese Wave at Central Park Summerstage Festival 2015, New York City, United States

== Awards and nominations ==
=== Awards ===
Year	Awards	
2003	The 15th CASH Song Writers Quest	Winner:《At That Moment》
2007	The 5th Annual HITO Pop Music Award	DJ's Most Popular Album: 《My Life Will...》; HITO Best New Artist
2007	The Second Annual KKBOX Music Award	New Singer of the Year
2007	The Second Annual Stars Award	Best Female Singer
2007	HITO Radio Music Awards	Best New Female Artist: Deserts Chang; DJ's Best Loved Album: 《My Life Will...》
2008	The 6th Annual HITO Pop Music Award	HITO Pop Music Lyricist: 〈Like〉
2008	2009 Beijing Pop Festival	Best Singer-Songwriter in Hong Kong and Taiwan
2013	The 13th Annual Top Chinese Music Awards	Best Singer-Songwriter Award; Best Lyricist Award; Best Song Producer Award

=== Nominations ===
Years	Nominations	
2007	The 18th Annual Golden Melody Awards	Song of the Year Nomination: 〈Baby (in the night)〉; Best Chinese Album Nomination: 《My Life Will...》; Best Lyricist Nomination: 〈Baby (in the night)〉; Best Composer Nomination: 〈Baby (in the night)〉
2008	The 19th Annual Golden Melody Awards	Best Lyricist Nomination: After All
2008	The 8th Annual Top Chinese Music Awards	Best Lyricist in Hong Kong and Taiwan Nomination: 〈The Annoying Word〉; Best Music Arranger in Hong Kong and Taiwan Nomination: 〈Like〉; Best Female Singer in Hong Kong and Taiwan Nomination: 《Dear...I don't know yet》; Best Album in Hong Kong and Taiwan Nomination: 《Dear...I don't know yet》; Best Singer-Songwriter in Hong Kong and Taiwan Nomination: 《Dear...I don't know yet》; Best Producer in Hong Kong and Taiwan Nomination: 《Dear...I don't know yet》; Best Song in Hong Kong and Taiwan Nomination: 〈Appearance〉, 〈The Annoying Word〉, 〈Like〉
2010	The 21st Annual Golden Melody Awards	Best Chinese Female Singer: The City
2012	The 23rd Annual Golden Melody Awards	Best Song Writer Nomination: Please Give Me A Better Rival In Love
