= North Carolina International Port =

In early 2006 the North Carolina State Ports Authority (NCSPA) conceived its proposal for a North Carolina International Terminal to be created on property that it purchased just north of the town of Southport, NC between the Progress Energy Brunswick Nuclear Power Plant and the Sunny Point Military Ammunitions Port. The NCSPA purchased the property in early 2006 for $30 million from Pfizer. Having met substantial public and political resistance in ensuing years, this proposal will not likely move forward in the foreseeable future.

Site Proposed for North Carolina International Terminal (facing southwest)

== Proposed scope and infrastructure investment ==
Conceptual designs for the North Carolina International Terminal called for a high-density, automated container terminal capable of serving 12,000-TEU vessels with at least a 50-foot draft (the existing navigation channel serving the Port of Wilmington in the Wilmington Harbor has a dredge depth of 42 (+/-) feet). Development of the North Carolina International Terminal on the existing footprint could result in a terminal that could handle as many as 2-3 million TEUs a year, which is equivalent to the capacity currently handled by container terminals such as Charleston and Savannah. Construction cost projections as of June 2010 were approximately $4.4 billion (escalated).

Development would have required additional transportation infrastructure expenditures to accommodate the movement of cargo to and from the terminal by both road and rail. Currently, both road and rail access to the proposed North Carolina International Terminal site are limited and would have required substantial improvement to accommodate the expected cargo volumes and to alleviate additional traffic on local roadways.

== Proposed container traffic and job creation ==
In support of their land purchase and the proposed construction, the NCSPA had stated that there are currently few ports on the U.S. East Coast that can offer the deep draft conditions and large container terminals that will be required in the future. New locks and channels were under construction at the time and have now been completed, allowing for much larger "post-Panamax" containerships to transit the canal. Many containers that had been transiting the Pacific and unloading at west coast ports and moving via rail to points east could likely move more economically to east coast ports through the canal. The NCSPA had proposed that the port capitalize on this new container growth and provide new job opportunities for the region and the state.

== Competition from existing East Coast ports ==
In competition with the proposed port, the majority of existing east coast ports have been investing in dredging and expansion projects to attract the larger post-Panamax vessels. In February 2011, Alberto Aleman, the CEO of the Panama Canal, addressed the issue of expanding capacity on the east coast "Two deeper, wider ports along the US Eastern seaboard and one in the Gulf coast should be enough to handle the growth in traffic, instead of the approximately 13 port expansions now underway. The East Coast has many ports, and the large container ships are not going to stop at every port." Now that there is indeed excess capacity where the new post-Panamax vessels can find existing east coast ports competing with each other for business, it is obvious that the proposed Southport site would have been in a difficult competitive position given its poor access to mainstream rail and truck routes. Conversely, North Carolina manufacturers already have a number of existing cost-competitive overseas shipping port options to keep them competitive with other east coast manufacturers without a taxpayer-subsidized port in Southport.

Competition by existing east coast ports was accelerated on July 19, 2012, when President Obama announced that the federal government was expediting five major port expansion projects at Jacksonville and Miami, Fla.; Savannah, Ga.; Charleston, S.C.; New York and New Jersey. The White House said that the expedited projects would be completed between 2012 and 2015.

The Southport site would also have been at a competitive disadvantage geographically, located on an inherently shallow-water estuary. "God gave Norfolk that advantage," said NC Secretary of Transportation Gene Conti on Aug. 13, 2012, referring to the natural deep water in and around Hampton Roads. "I can't compete with God."

In his March 27, 2013 presentation of "The Future of NC Ports", Jeff Miles, acting executive director of the N.C. State Ports Authority, put into words the authority's current approach to competing with other East Coast ports. "Charleston, Norfolk and Savannah today are just behemoth container operators," he said. "Engaging in an arms race with those guys is a prescription for a serious loss. We just can't go toe-to-toe with them today."

== Public and political support and opposition ==
Support: The Army Corps of Engineers, the Int'l Longshoremen's Assoc. and the Brunswick County Commissioners had led the list of supporters. Yes Port NC solicited public support as well.

Opposition: Early opposition began with the grassroots organizing efforts of NoPort Southport and Save the Cape. By 2010, all six communities in the affected lower Cape Fear region had expressed their opposition to the proposed port, including Southport, Caswell Beach, Bald Head Island, Saint James, Boiling Spring Lakes and Oak Island. On June 29, 2010, US Congressman Mike McIntyre, who represents the affected 7th Congressional District and is the vice-chairman of the Armed Services Subcommittee on Terrorism, announced his opposition to the proposed terminal. Rep. McIntyre cited most of the negative issues listed below as the basis for his opposition. The US Fish and Wildlife Commission had also expressed its opposition.

On July 19, 2012, both the Democratic and Republican candidates vying for North Carolina governor in the November 2012 elections (with incumbent Gov. Perdue choosing not to seek reelection) declared their opposition to the megaport proposal. Walter Dalton (Dem) cited lack of support by federal and state lawmakers, and Governor-elect Pat McCrory (Rep) stated that "Questions of feasibility should have been asked before we wasted millions to buy the land and conduct studies" and further stated that he has long believed that the marketplace doesn't support a new port.

== Environmental, quality-of-life, and property value impact ==
Opponents of the megaport had expressed concerns for its environmental impact in this ecologically sensitive area; as well as local health and quality-of-life impacts associated with imposing major port traffic on this small residential coastal community (Southport, North Carolina). In addition, the proposed deeper dredging required to support post-Panamax containership vessels threatens shoreline integrity of Cape Fear coastal communities (Oak Island, North Carolina) and (Bald Head Island, North Carolina) as well as threatening the integrity of the fresh water aquifer (required for potable water throughout the region) that runs immediately below the existing Cape Fear River seaway and would be destroyed by seawater impingement if the specified dredging depths occurred. Consistent with other major port areas along the eastern seaboard, port opponents anticipated that residential property values in the affected lower Cape Fear would decrease substantially with the advent of a major port environment.

== Terrorism risk ==
The affected municipalities in the lower Cape Fear, as well as US Congressman Mike McIntyre, had also expressed safety and security concerns; since the proposed port site is located adjacent to both a nuclear power plant (Brunswick Nuclear Generating Station) and the world's largest weapons, ammunition, explosives and military equipment terminal (Military Ocean Terminal Sunny Point). In a report prepared for the Pentagon by the Nuclear Proliferation Prevention Project (NPPP) at the University of Texas at Austin's LBJ School of Public Affairs, the Brunswick Nuclear Power Plant near Southport is considered among the 11 most vulnerable because it further lacks protection against attack from the sea, and the proximity of a major international port would have served only to aggravate this vulnerability.

== Public investment requirement ==
Due to its remote location and absence of freeway and major rail services that are common to other existing container ports in the U.S., taxpayers would have been required to fund the expansive public works construction projects needed to deal with the high volume of truck and rail traffic into and out of the Southport area before securing any commitments by private investors (that the NCSPA had stated were necessary for the port proposal to proceed). US and North Carolina taxpayers would have had to commit to the infrastructure improvements with no assurance that private investors would "come to the table" to invest in the port venture.

== Private commercial investment ==
In over seven years since the inception of the Megaport concept, the NCSPA had not found any commercial partners willing to participate in this investment, posing substantial doubt as to the commercial viability of the proposal. Projects already underway or planned for deep water access at competing east coast ports, targeted to attract post-Panamax vessels, further exacerbated the commercial viability of the NCIT proposal.

== NCDOT maritime strategy study ==
After having declared a "hold" on their pursuit of the Southport megaport proposal on July 21, 2010, in the face of public and political opposition, NCSPA Board Chairman Carl Stewart stated at the time that he and the Port Authority Board remain committed to continue pursuing the Southport megaport proposal at this site in the future. Shortly after the reorganization of the NCSPA under the NC Department of Transportation in March, 2011, the NCDOT announced the development of a Maritime Strategy Study to include, among other issues, reconsideration of the NCIT proposal. On June 26, 2012, the study team released its final report which concluded that investment in the existing ports in Wilmington and Morehead City would be more cost effective than pursuing the megaport at Southport, although it was still included as an alternative. The study estimated the total cost for the megaport, including infrastructure, to be $6.1 billion.

== Changes in NCSPA leadership and port focus ==
Although his term as Chairman extended into 2016, Stewart's early resignation from the NCSPA Board was announced on Aug. 23, 2012 Also announced at that time was the appointment of Tom Bradshaw as the executive director of the North Carolina State Port Authority, the position formerly held by Tom Eagar. With Stewart's departure from NCSPA, there were no remaining elected or appointed officials at the federal or state level who advocated spending more taxpayer dollars in pursuit or evaluation of the megaport proposal; and there are still, to this day, no private entities expressing any interest for investing in the megaport concept.

On August 29, 2012, Governor Perdue appointed state Rep. Danny McComas, a Republican in his final term and resident of Wilmington, as chairman of the NCSPA Board of Directors, replacing Carl Stewart. Rep. McComas stated that the megaport project is "not on my radar screen. I don't see that going anywhere in the near future."

While this combination of circumstances would seem to doom the prospects for the megaport proposal, the 600-acre parcel originally purchased in 2005 is still owned by the NCSPA and remains available for such industrial development.

== Alternative uses for the megaport property ==
An alternative use for the parcel purchased by the NCSPA for the megaport has been proposed by "Save the Cape". Their proposal is that the property be purchased from the NCSPA by the State of North Carolina for designation as a state park, preserving "the biodiversity of the limited remaining coastal wetlands for future generations."

== Attempt to revive the port proposal in the NC legislature ==
NC Sen. Michael Lee, R-New Hanover, sponsored a bill in the NC Senate for removal of "The Rocks" between Zeke's and Smith islands on the southern tip of New Hanover County, which became part of N.C. House Bill 97, the 2015 Appropriations Act. While NC Senate legislators state that its purpose is for "ecosystem restoration and protection of navigational safety", a majority of regional institutions and local governments found this hard to believe. "What I smell in this is that we're not being leveled with about what's really going on," said Larry Cahoon, a professor and oceanographer at the University of North Carolina Wilmington. "Ecologically, I haven't heard an argument about what's broken that needs fixing." The "Removal of the Rocks" initiative by the NC Senate is seen by many Cape Fear Area observers as another ploy at siting an international port at the property that the NCSPA still owns just west of "the Rocks". The NCIT proposal continues to be rejected by local governments (by their unanimous rejection of the "Removal of the Rocks" proposal). As of early 2018, nothing seems to have resulted from Rep. Lee's proposal.

== 2020 Wilmington port improvements ==
The NC Port Authority announced on April 7, 2020, that the Wilmington Container Port is "ready to welcome the largest container ships calling on the United States East Coast following the completion of Phase II of the Turning Basin Expansion Project there.". On May 20, 2020, the Hyundai Hope, a 16,000 TEU containership, set the record for the largest vessel to enter the Cape Fear bound for Wilmington.
