= Taipei City Council =

Legislature of Taipei City, Taiwan

Taipei City Council 臺北市議會
- 14th Taipei City Council

Type
- Type: City council

History
- Founded: 25 December 1969
- Preceded by: Provisional Taipei City Council
- New session started: 25 December 2022

Leadership
- Speaker: Tai Hsi-Tsin (KMT) since 25 December 2022
- Deputy Speaker: Yeh Lin-chuang (KMT) since 25 December 2018

Structure
- Seats: 61
- Political groups: Kuomintang (28); Democratic Progressive (19); Taiwan People's (4); New Party (1); Social Democratic (1); Independent (1); Vacant (7)
- Length of term: 4 years

Elections
- Voting system: Single non-transferable vote
- First election: 15 November 1969
- Last election: 26 November 2022
- Next election: 28 November 2026

Meeting place
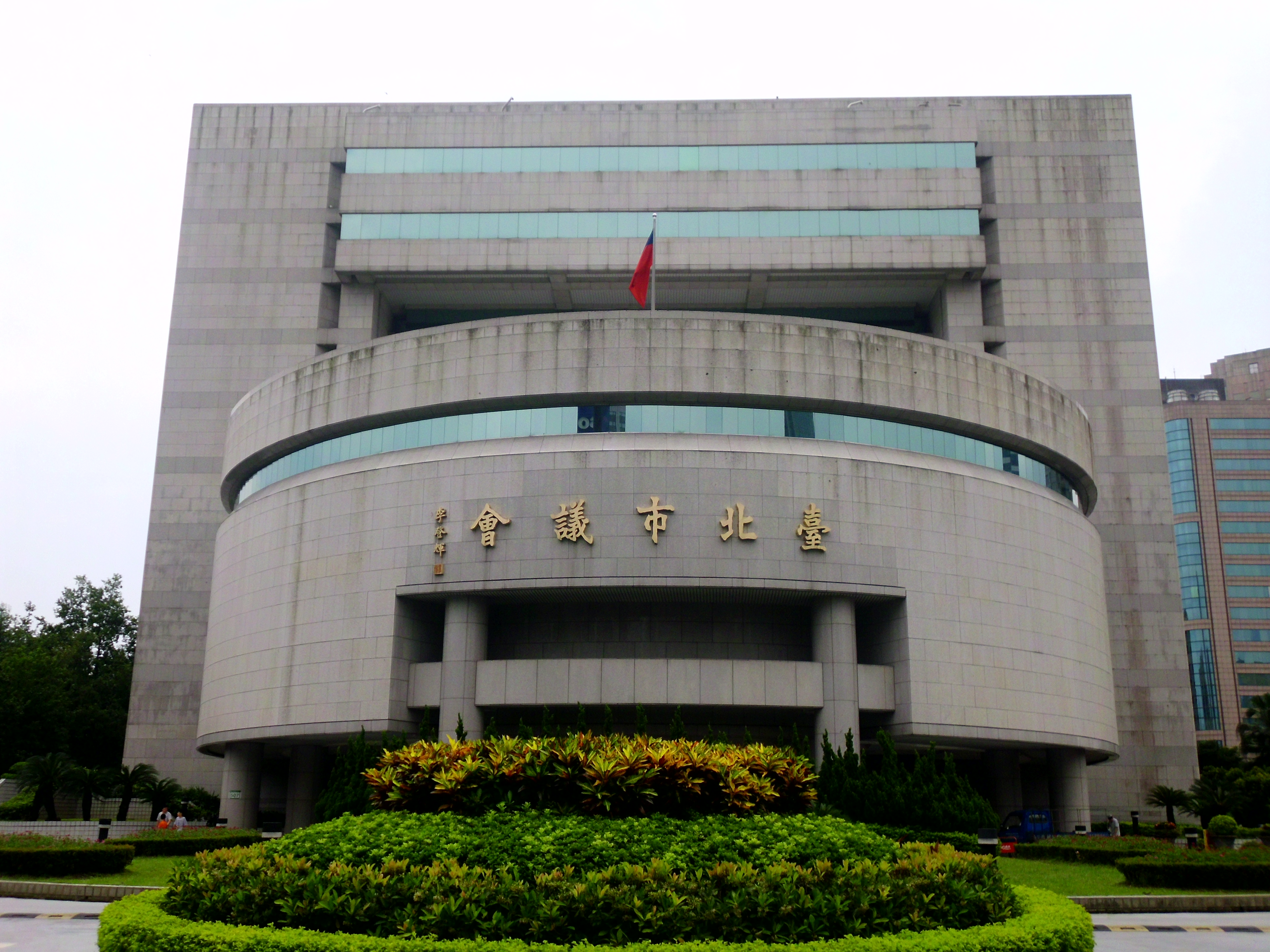
- No. 507, Sec. 4, Renai Road, Xinyi District, Taipei City 110, Republic of China (Taiwan); 25°02′19″N 121°33′43″E

Website
- www.tcc.gov.tw

Constitution
- Constitution of the Republic of China

Taipei City Council (Chinese: 台北市議會; pinyin: Táiběishì Yìhuì) is the city council of Taipei, Taiwan. One of the largest local councils in Taiwan, the city council is currently composed of 61 councillors, all elected most recently in the 2022 Taiwanese local elections.

== Composition ==
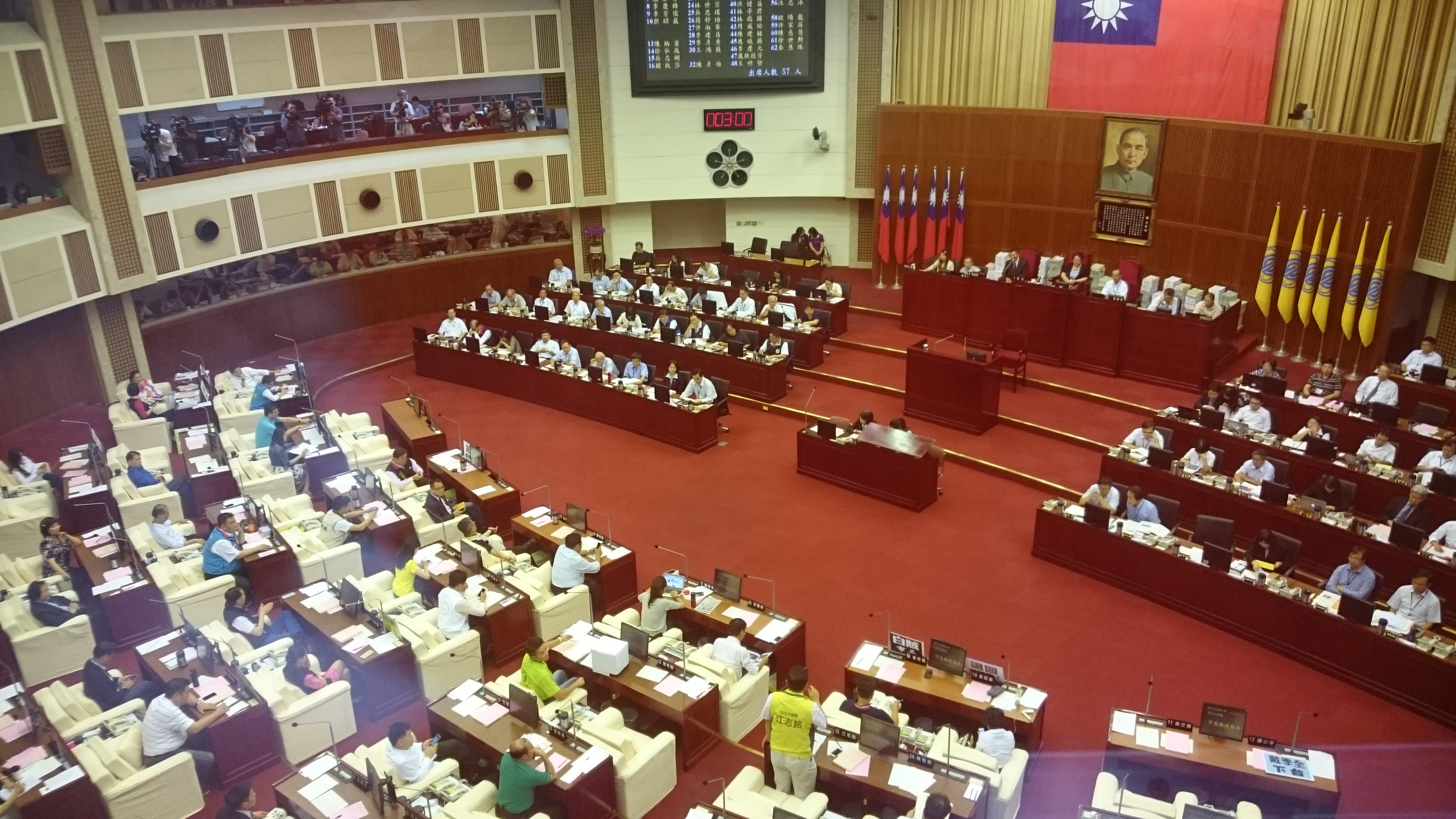
Meeting hall of the Council

The Kuomintang, gaining 2 seat after the 2022 Taiwanese local elections, maintained its status as the largest party in the city council, but falling short of an overall majority. The Democratic Progressive Party, although still being the largest opposition party in the council, gain 2 seats in the election. New Party and People First Party, members of the conventional pan-Blue coalition, won 2 seats each. Smaller parties, including New Power Party, Social Democratic Party and Can't Stop This Party, won 3 seats in total. All standing as an independent, 7 candidates were elected to the city council.

Since the local elections in 2022, the Council was composed as follows:

Composition of the Taipei City Council
Parliamentary Groups	Seats
Kuomintang	30
Democratic Progressive Party	21
Taiwan People's Party	4
New Party	1
Social Democratic Party	1
Independent	3
Total	61

== History ==
=== First building ===
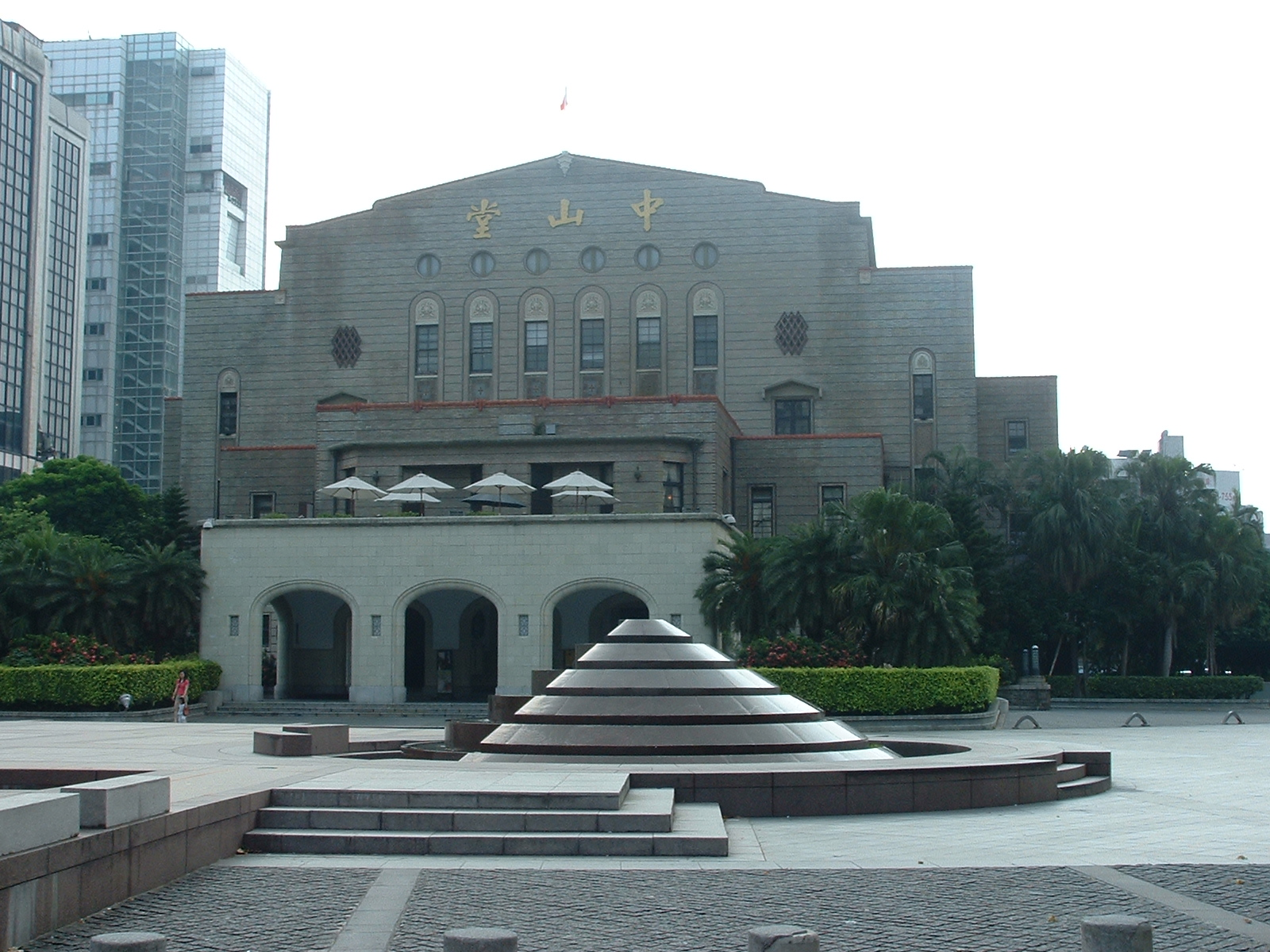
First building of Taipei City Counci, Zhongshan Hall

The Council was formed in 1946 after the handover of Taiwan to the Republic of China from the Japanese Government. The Council Chamber was initially located in the Zhongshan Hall in Zhongzheng District.

=== Second building ===
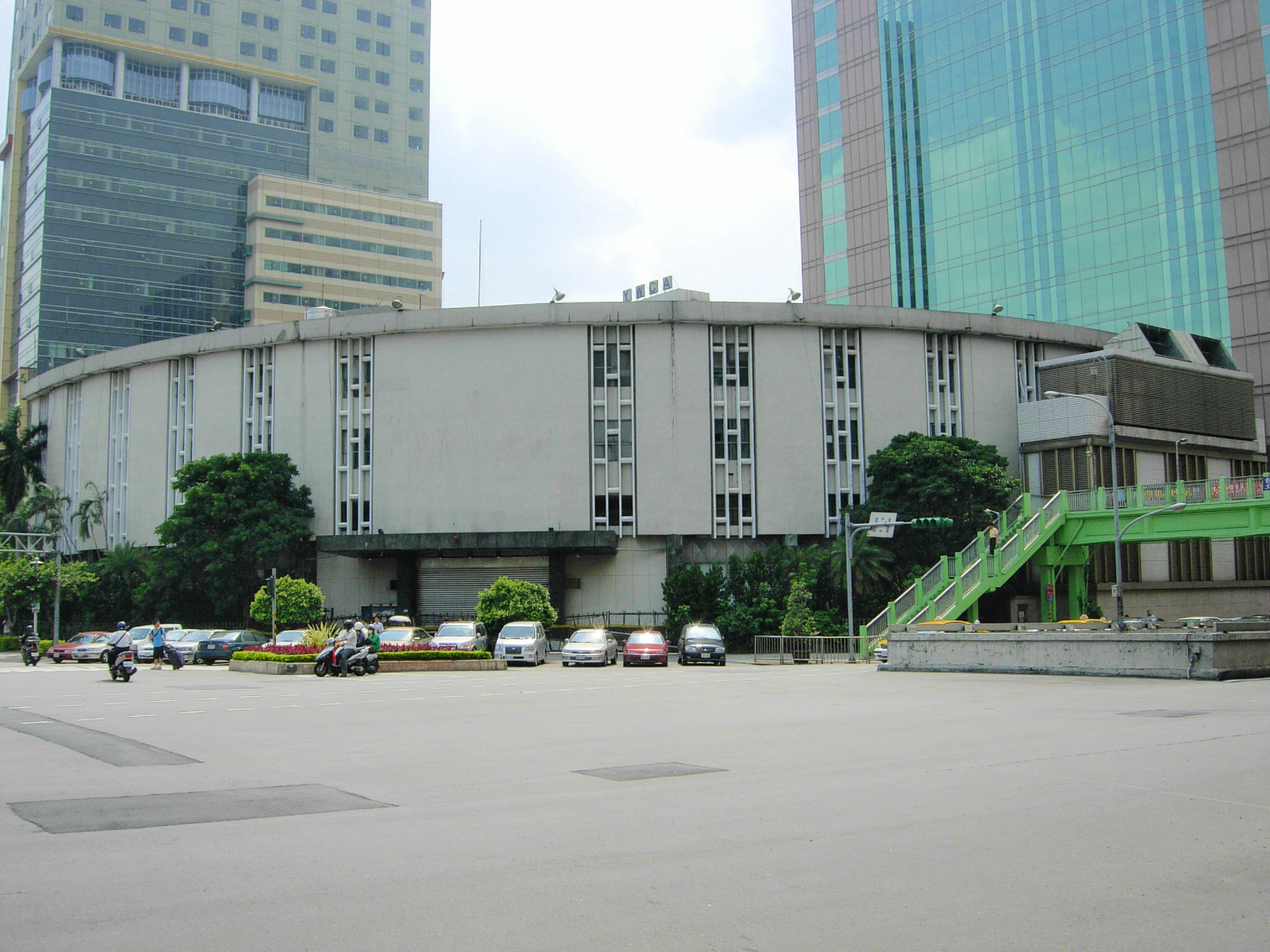
Second building of Taipei City Council

On 3 August 1964, the Council moved to a site on the corner of Zhongxiao West Road and Zhongshan South Road, still in Zhongzheng District. The building occupied an area of 42,965 m^{2}. In 2016, the Taipei City Government plans to redevelop the abandoned former council building into the Taipei City Vision Museum as part of the Taipei museum strip. The building was demolished on 25 February 2016 and reopened to the public as open green space on 9 April 2016.

=== Current building ===
The current Council building is located in the History Project Area of Taipei in Xinyi District. It was inaugurated on 8 October 1990.

== Organization ==
- Speaker
- Deputy Speaker
- Secretary-General
- Deputy Secretary-General
  - Permanent Committee's office
  - Secretariat Office
  - Procedure Section
  - General Affairs Section
  - Documents Section
  - Public Relations Office
  - Legal Affairs Office
  - Information Office
  - Personnel Office
  - Accounting Office
- Permanent Committees
  - Civil Affairs Committee
  - Finance and Construction Committee
  - Education Committee
  - Transportation Committee
  - Police and Sanitation Committee
  - Public Works Committee
  - Legislation Committee
- Special Committees
  - Procedure Committee
  - Discipline Committee

== Transportation ==
The council building is accessible within walking distance South West from Taipei City Hall Station of the Taipei Metro.

== See also ==
- Xinyi Planning District
- Taipei City Government
  - Mayor of Taipei
  - Taipei City Hall
- Sister cities of Taipei
