= Trees Party =

Trees Party 樹黨 Shù Dǎng (Mandarin) Su Tóng (Hakka)
- Chairperson (joint): Sheng I-che; Chiu Hsin-hui
- Founded: 10 August 2014; 11 years ago
- Headquarters: Taipei, Taiwan
- Ideology: Environmentalism; Youth activism Social democracy
- Political position: Centre-left
- International affiliation: Global Greens
- Legislative Yuan: 0 / 113
- Municipal Mayoralties: 0 / 6
- City Mayoralties and County Magistracies: 0 / 16
- Local Councillors: 0 / 912
- Township Chiefs: 0 / 204

Website
- www.treesparty.tw

The Trees Party (Chinese: 樹黨; pinyin: Shù Dǎng; Pe̍h-ōe-jī: Chhiū Tóng) was a minor political party in Taiwan. The core ideology of the party was environmentalism, and it was commonly identified as a "third force" party belonging to neither the Pan-Blue or Pan-Green Coalitions. The party was formed in 2014 as a splinter group of the Green Party Taiwan by brothers Pan Han-sheng and Pan Han-chiang.

== History ==
In 2014 Pan Han-sheng, one of the "stars" of the Green Party Taiwan (GPT), left the fold to start a new party, the Trees Party with his brother, Pan Han-chiang, a development described as "damaging" to the GPT. Despite this, the Green Party Taiwan responded to the announcement of the formation of the Trees Party by "welcoming their strong stance on the protection of trees". While several articles in the English-language media refer to the party as the "Tree Party", the formal English name as stated in the constitution is the "Trees Party".

In April 2020 the Trees Party was given notification by the Ministry of Interior of its disbandment.

== Platform ==
There are six core policy positions articulated in the party constitution: environmental stewardship, social justice, upholding participatory democracy, pacifism, sustainable development, and respect for diversity. The constitution also commits the party to "defending trees and Mother Earth from human greed and ignorance".

The party sees its mission as:

- Increasing public awareness of the global environmental crisis, with political action proposed as the main solution
- Nominating candidates to participate in elections
- Proposing public policy
- Providing educational programs and publications and encouraging citizen participation
- Promoting exchanges and cooperation between domestic and foreign political groups and local environmental groups
- Other matters to promote an environment conducive to political development

== Electoral performance ==
In the November 2014 9-in-1 elections the party won one seat in the Yilan County council. In the race for the Taipei City Council, the party polled 2.1% of the total votes cast, winning no seats. In the same set of elections, the party won one mayoral race, for Jiji Township in Nantou County. The mayor resigned from the party on 24 June 2015.
