= Formoz Festival =

Annual music festival in Taiwan

Formoz Festival 野台開唱
- Genre: Indie Music
- Dates: Every summer, no specific dates
- Locations: Taipei Children's Recreation Center; Taipei Expo Park (Added in 2013)
- Years active: 1995–2008; restarted in 2013
- Website: formoz.com

Formoz Festival (Chinese: 野台開唱; pinyin: Yětái Kāichàng) is a music festival in Taiwan. Started in 1995 with only ten participating bands, Formoz Festival plays an important role in the development of Taiwanese indie music and has now become a three-day event, attracting music fans from Japan, Korea, Singapore, Hong Kong.

It is organized by the Taiwan Rock Alliance which is led by Freddy Lim. Lim's collective paid a large amount of money in that year for Megadeth, Biohazard, and Yo La Tengo to appear, and the 2001 Formoz Festival became the largest international music festival ever held in Taiwan.

Before 2005, it had been fairly easy for concertgoers to sneak in for free. That year, the TRA increased the ticket price and made the entrance process more stringent, in hopes of breaking even. The 2005 Formoz Festival was headlined by Moby and Lisa Loeb.

== See also ==
- Music of Taiwan
