= Cheng Cheng-chien =

Taiwanese politician

Cheng Cheng-chien MLY
- 鄭正鈐
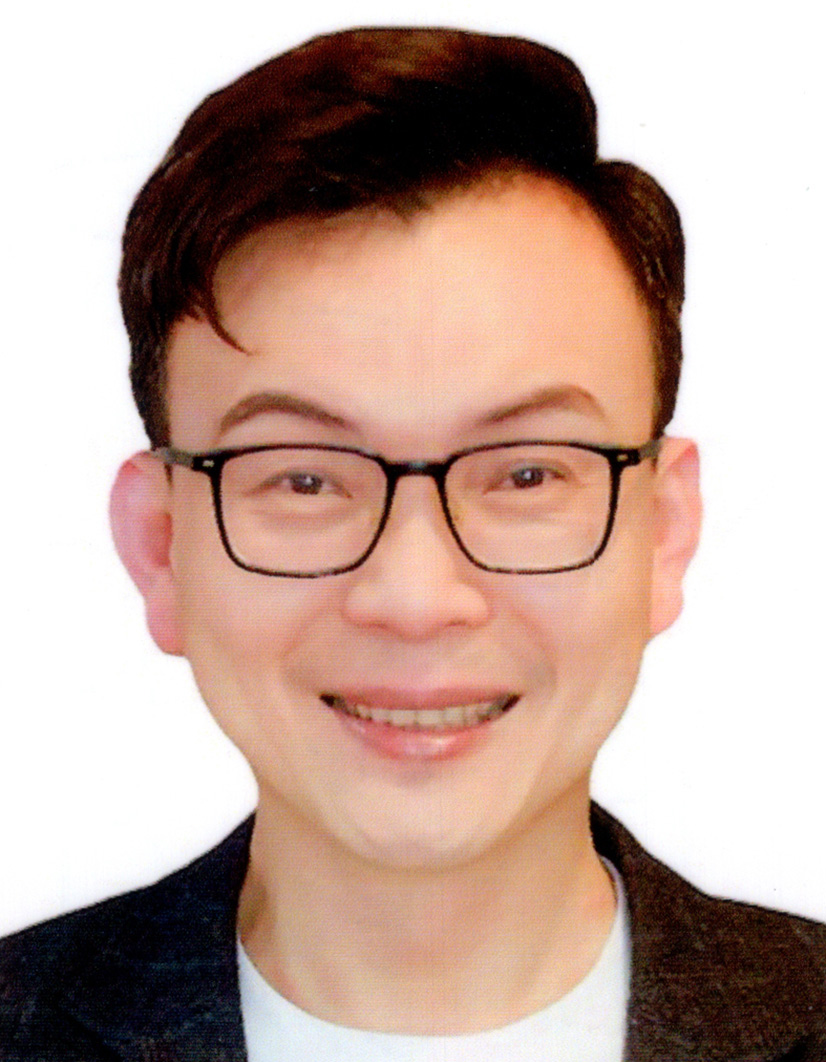
- Official portrait, 2024

Member of the Legislative Yuan
- Incumbent
- Assumed office 1 February 2020
- Preceded by: Ker Chien-ming
- Constituency: Hsinchu City

Hsinchu City Councillor
- In office 1 March 2002 – 31 January 2020

Personal details
- Born: 31 May 1969 (age 56) Hsinchu County, Taiwan
- Party: Kuomintang
- Education: National Chengchi University (BA, MA); Chung Hua University (PhD)

Cheng Cheng-chien (Chinese: 鄭正鈐; pinyin: Zhèng Zhèngqián; born 31 May 1969) is a Taiwanese politician. He was a member of the Hsinchu City Council from 2002 to 2020, when he was elected to the Legislative Yuan.

== Early life and education ==
Cheng was born on 31 May 1969, in Hsinchu, and graduated from National Hsinchu Senior High School.

Cheng studied journalism and diplomacy as an undergraduate at National Chengchi University, where he earned a bachelor's degree and then, in 1996, a master's degree in East Asian studies. His master's thesis was titled, "Research on Taiwanese businessmen's investment in the mainland real estate brokerage industry" (Chinese: 臺商投資大陸房地產仲介業之研究).

After receiving his master's degree, Cheng earned a Ph.D. in technology management from Chung Hua University in 2009. His doctoral dissertation was titled, "Using Kano's Model to correct performance analysis methods: the example of Taiwan's industrial computer manufacturing industry" (Chinese: 運用Kano’s Model修正重要度-表現度分析法：以臺灣工業電腦製造業個案研究為例). He has taught as an assistant professor at Chung Hua University and Hsuan Chuang University.

== Political career ==
Cheng served on the Hsinchu City Council from 2002 to 2020. He won his first election to the body as a Kuomintang candidate. Chen was listed as an independent candidate in the 2005 local elections, and returned to the Kuomintang for the 2009 election cycle. Cheng retained his seat in 2014 and 2018, running both times under the Kuomintang banner.

Cheng contested a Legislative Yuan seat in Hsinchu during the 2004 legislative election as an independent candidate, and was not seated. He ran as the Kuomintang candidate in the Hsinchu City Constituency during the 2016 legislative election, after defeating Lu Hsueh-chang in a party primary. He faced New Power Party candidate Chiu Hsien-chih and Democratic Progressive Party incumbent Ker Chien-ming. The Democratic Progressive Party suspected Cheng of buying votes during a banquet hosted by the Hsinchu City chapter of the Kuomintang in December 2015, as he attended the event while wearing a vest promoting his campaign. Subsequently, the Hsinchu District Prosecutors’ Office began an investigation into the banquet. The Democratic Progressive Party then filed a lawsuit against Kuomintang chair Eric Chu at the Taipei District Prosecutors' Office related to alleged vote buying at the banquet. The vote buying allegations became a topic of discussion during the second televised presidential debate between Chu and Tsai Ing-wen. During his unsuccessful 2016 campaign, pamphlets distributed by Cheng's supporters were confiscated by Hsinchu police. Though Cheng protested the confiscation, the Hsinchu District Prosecutors' office stated that the pamphlets merited further investigation, as they contained distortions about and sensationalist allegations against Ker Chien-ming.

During his 2020 campaign, Cheng drew attention to a perceived double standard, stating that he had been labeled a pro-China candidate by the Democratic Progressive Party, but that his opponent Cheng Hung-huei used the term "Taiwan, China" while establishing a business in China, only to campaign on a promise to "Protect Taiwan". Cheng Cheng-chien was elected to the 10th Legislative Yuan, and became a member of the legislature's Education and Culture Committee. In July 2020, New Power Party chair Hsu Yung-ming asked Cheng to step down from that role, as Huang Kuo-chang accused Cheng of plagiarizing a portion of his doctoral thesis.
