= The Affiliated Senior High School of National Chi-Nan University =

High school in Puli, Nantou County, Taiwan

Coordinates: 23.9722°N 120.9447°E

- 國立暨南國際大學附屬高級中學

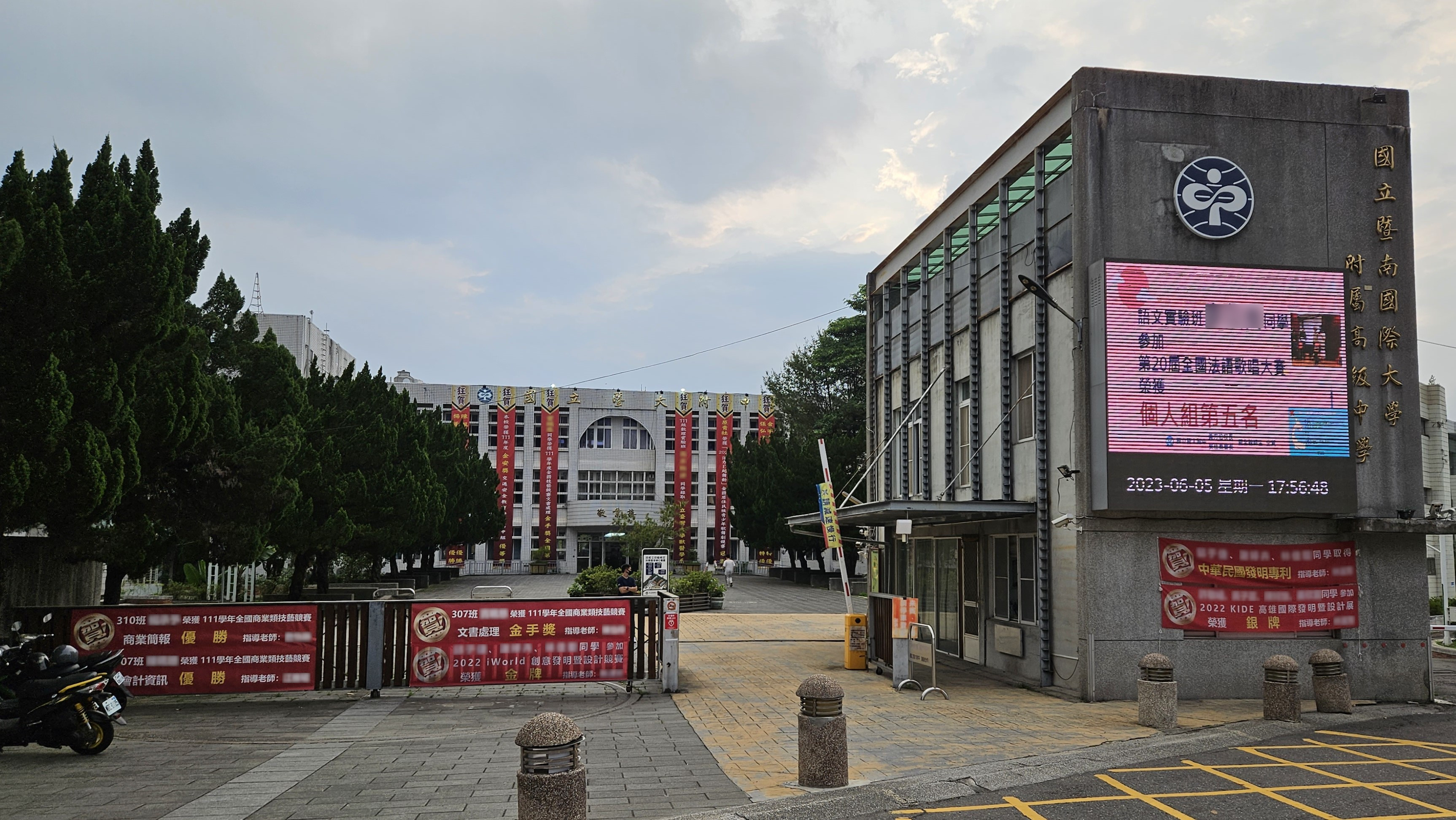

Location
- No.1-6, Tieshan Rd. Puli township Nantou County, 545302; Taiwan

Information
- Other name: CNASH
- Former name: Puli Senior High School
- Funding type: Public schools
- Mottoes: 誠、正、勤、樸 (Honesty, Integrity, Diligence, Simplicity)
- Established: 1 August 1958
- School code: 080308
- Principal: Fang-Bo Huang (黃方伯)
- Staff: 21
- Faculty: 95
- Grades: 10-12
- Gender: All genders
- Age range: 16 - 18
- Enrollment: 952
- Classes: 36
- Language: Standard Mandarin (traditional)
- Area: 5.52 hectares
- Website: www.pshs.ntct.edu.tw

The Affiliated Senior High School of National Chi-Nan University (Chinese: 國立暨南國際大學附屬高級中學; 暨大附中; CNASH), formerly known as National Puli Senior High School (國立埔里高級中學; 埔里高中; PSHS), is a national comprehensive high school located in Puli Town, Nantou County, Taiwan. The campus is located on the east side of Ailan Terrace and is adjacent to Ailan Elementary School. It is a three-year high school with a high school department and a technical and vocational department. It has a comprehensive high school department, a business vocational department and a night school.

The CNASH was originally established as the high school section of Puli Middle School in 1958. In 1968, in response to the "Nine-year compulsory national education" and "High schools run by the Taiwan Provincial Government and junior high schools run by counties and cities", it became "Puli Senior High School" and moved its school campus to Ailan Terrace. In 2001, it was transformed into a high school affiliated with National Chi Nan University.

The current campus is located on the Tamalin archaeological site (Chinese: 大馬璘遺址) of the Neolithic Age. In the past thirty years, earthquake reconstruction and school building projects have triggered discussions about the protection and destruction of underground archaeological site and cultural relics.

== History ==
=== Puli Middle School and its predecessor ===
The earliest predecessor of CNASH can be traced back to the "Jiezhuang Group Puli Home Economics Girls' School" (Chinese: 街庄組合埔里家政女學校) established in 1943 during The period of Japanese rule. It was later renamed "Puli Agricultural Practice Girls' School" (Chinese: 埔里農業實踐女學校). In 1944, the school was restructured into "Taiwan Public Puli Girls' Agricultural Practice School" School" (Chinese: 臺灣公立埔里女子農業實踐學校). After the Government of the Republic of China came to Taiwan in 1945, it was taken over by the Taichung Prefecture Takeover Committee on December 6 of the same year and renamed "Taichung County Puli Girls' Home Economics School"(Chinese: 臺中縣立埔里女子家政學校). In 1946, due to the reorganization of Taiwan's academic system, the higher education or youth schools attached to national schools during the period of Japanese rule were abolished, greatly reducing the opportunities for national school graduates to enter higher education. In February of this year, the Provincial Education Bureau promulgated the "Measures for the Establishment of County and Municipal Secondary Schools", and the Taichung County Government selected places such as Nantou, Yushan, Nenggao and Zhushan to set up junior high schools. In March of this year, Puli gentry Wanchu Luo (Chinese: 羅萬俥) and Qiu Xu (Chinese: 許秋) could not bear to see graduates who wanted to further their education have to travel and travel to other places to study. So they jointly fought for the establishment of a secondary school in the Puli area. On April 22 of the same year, the Taichung County Government approved the reorganization of the school building and land of the Taichung County Puli Girls' Home Economics School into the "Taichung County Puli Junior High School" (Chinese: 臺中縣立埔里初級中學). Later, due to the 1950 In August, Taiwan's administrative regions were redrawn, and the Nantou area became independent from Taichung County. "Taichung County Puli Junior High School" was also renamed "Nantou County Puli Junior High School" (Chinese: 南投縣立埔里初級中學). On August 1, 1958, Puli Junior High School added a high school department, was renamed "Nantou County Puli Middle School" (Chinese: 南投縣立埔里中學) and upgraded to a comprehensive junior-senior high school.

=== Puli High School ===
In 1967, the government implemented "nine-year compulsory education" and "High schools run by the Taiwan Provincial Government and junior high schools run by counties and cities". Following the recommendations of the provincial council and the requests of local people, the provincial government allocated the Puli Distillery on the Ailan Terrace in June of the same year. The province-owned wine storage warehouse land is about 5.5 hectares as the school site. In 1968, the high school department of Puli Middle School was independently classified as a provincial school from Puli Middle School and established as "Provincial Puli Senior High School" (Chinese: 省立埔里高級中學), from the former directly under the Nantou County Government Education Bureau to directly under the Taiwan Provincial Government Department of Education, and the school administration was established separately from the independent Puli High School. The junior high school of the original Puli Middle School remained in the original school building, which is now the Puli Junior High School. On April 19 of the same year, the first phase of the school building project started, organized by the Provincial Nantou High School, and the day was designated as the school anniversary. In July, the provincial government announced that Ye qiang Zhong (Chinese: 鍾業強) would be the first principal, and the school song and motto were formulated. On August 1, Puli High School was officially established. The school was transferred to Puli Middle School, a total of 4 classes of senior 2 and senior 3, to be taken over by Puli High School, and 4 classes of senior high school students were recruited. In September, because the school building was not yet completed, the opening ceremony and classes were held at Ailan Elementary School. In October, the school building project was completed, and the whole school moved into the new school building for classes. Previously, Puli High School was a pure high school. In August 1971, in response to the changes in the industrial and commercial society, an attached vocational business department was established. In August 1972, it was established "Puli Senior High School Attached Supplementary School" also piloted a supplementary school for comprehensive business subjects. In August 1973, the supplementary school was officially established. In August 1978, the Higher Vocational School added an accounting and statistics department. In August 1987, the supplementary school established an accounting department. Self-sufficient classes in the Affairs Department and Business Management Department.

=== 1999 Jiji earthquake ===
On September 21, 1999, the school building was severely damaged after the Jiji earthquake. At the time of the earthquake, 278 boarding students were still on campus. After gathering at the square for roll call, all of them were fine. The school lent the playground to Puli Christian Hospital. As a helicopter parking area to transport the injured, the activity center became a centralized distribution point for disaster relief items. The school's "Water Elf Scout Troop", "Transportation Service Team" and teachers went to the disaster area after the earthquake to provide disaster relief, assist in transportation, and take care of the injured. On August 30, 2000, "Water Elf Scout Troop" and "Transportation Service Team" were selected as the 1999 National Representative of Good People and Good Deeds. The then Vice President Lien Chan also took a helicopter to land at the playground at noon that day to inspect the disaster situation, and wrote in his disaster relief diary: "Seeing Puli The high school boy scouts have been organized to take care of the injured and grab supplies. These children, younger than my daughter, are already saving people one by one, which is touching." On October 4 of the same year, the whole school returned to school, and On this day, we launched a disaster investigation into the students' families. In this earthquake, one student dead in this earthquake, two were seriously injured, and two were slightly injured. Due to the upcoming General Scholastic Ability Test, the third grade students were notified first of all to resume classes, and were notified one after another on the 11th and 15th. Second-year students, First-year students and the Supplementary School students return to school. The first phase of school building reconstruction project started on May 17, 2000.

=== Affiliate to NCNU ===
National Chi Nan University was officially established in Puli on July 1, 1995. In order to achieve close cooperation between the university and the local area and improve the educational environment in Puli, on December 19, 1998, the then legislator Huang Lang Cai (Chinese: 蔡煌瑯) held a conference called Puli Zhenbao Hotel. A public hearing was held on "Provincial Puli High School Restructuring to Create the First National High School in Nantou County", and invite teachers and staff of NCNU, Puli High School and people from all walks of life were invited to participate. In the same month, the "Promoting the Restructuring of Puli High School" was immediately established. "Affiliate to NCNU Committee", with the then legislator Huang Lang Cai as the chairman of the promotion association, and the then principal of Puli High School Fu Hong Guo (Chinese: 郭孚宏) as the executive secretary of the promotion association.

On January 28, 1999, the following year, the restructuring committee held its first meeting. Most of the attendees agreed with the restructuring. However, not everyone agreed with the restructuring. For example, Wan Chang Jiang (Chinese: 江萬昌), the then town representative and parent representative who attended the meeting, believed that the restructuring might raise the threshold for admission to higher education. The Supplementary School should be closed, leaving local students with no opportunity to study. Puli High School should be retained, and the NCNU should establish a separate high school which affiliated to NCNU, and threatened to organize an anti-promotion association to boycott. Huang Lang Cai, the chairman of the meeting, believed that establish another high school which affiliated to NCNU is unfeasible, because Due to the difficulty of finding a school site and funding issues, the committee announced that it would adjourn the meeting because it could not reach a consensus. A meeting was held to discuss matters related to the restructuring. Wan Chang Jiang, the parent representative present at the meeting, still opposed the restructuring. In the end, all 37 representatives present voted. The result of the vote was still that only Jiang Wanchang was opposed, and the parents' association also sent the resolution as parents' opinion. Reference from the Department of Education, Ministry of Education and NCNU.

On February 1, 2000, due to the streamlined of administrative divisions of Taiwan, all provincial high schools in the Taiwan were classified as national, and "Provincial Puli Senior High School" was renamed "National Puli Senior High School" (Chinese: 國立埔里高級中學), on August 1 of the same year, the school transformed and opened a comprehensive high school on a trial basis. In December of the same year, Jin Fu Zhang (Chinese: 張進福), the then president of NCNU, and Fu Hong Guo (Chinese: 郭孚宏), the then principal of Puli High School, established the "Working Group to Promote the Reform of Puli High School to the High School Affiliated to NCNU", and in On May 8, 2001, a public hearing was held in NCNU and the "School Design Plan for the Senior High School Affiliated to NCNU" was completed and sent to the Ministry of Education. On June 8 of the same year, the interim school meeting approved the school's plan to It was renamed to NCNU. On July 27 of the same year, the Ministry of Education responded in principle with a letter of approval. On December 13 of the same year, Puli High School was officially affiliate to NCNU, and the school name was changed to "The Affiliated Senior High School of National Chi-Nan University" and held a restructuring unveiling ceremony and sports meeting in the morning of the same day, and formulated a new school emblem. The school anniversary was also rescheduled to December 13. NCNU also re-appointed the then principal of Puli High School Young Fu Zhang (Chinese: 張永福) as the CNASH. Principal, and "Puli Senior High School Affiliated Supplementary School" was also renamed as "NCNU Affiliated Senior High School Continuing School". In July 2005, the then principal Young Fu Zhang's term expired, NCNU intends to re-appoint him, and Young Fu Zhang intends to continue his term. However, a letter from the Ministry of Education stated that Young Fu Zhang did not meet the requirements of the Senior High School Law that "the vacancy of the principal of a high school affiliated to a university should be selected by teachers of associate professor or above from the university itself." Therefore, the principal was removed from the position and became the acting principal.

== Campus Environment ==
=== Campus History ===
CNASH was originally the Puli Middle School. The former school was located at the current Puli Junior High School, because of the "Nine-year compulsory national education" and "High schools run by the Taiwan Provincial Government and junior high schools run by counties and cities". School became independent from the Puli Middle School.Taiwan Provincial Government allocated approximately 5.52 hectares land in the province on the Ailan Terrace of the Puli Winery as the provincial Puli Senior High School site. Before it was allocated as the Puli Senior High School site, part of the land was used as a wine storage warehouse and the other part was dry farmland and orchard, it was originally a gentle slope with high east and low west, but was later organized into a stepped platform. Due to the Jiji earthquake, the campus was severely damaged. The reconstruction of the school building was handled by the Construction Administration of the Ministry of the Interior. The boys' dormitory, Zhuangjing Building (Chinese: 莊敬樓), Chengqin Building (Chinese: 誠勤樓) and Ziqiang Building (Chinese: 自強樓) were demolished after the earthquake.The first phase of school building reconstruction project started on May 17, 2000. The project was to demolish Zhuangjing Building and Chengqin Building and rebuild them into Lequn Building (Chinese: 樂群樓), Chengzheng Building (Chinese: 誠正樓) and Art Center. It was completed on December 13, 2002. The second phase of the school building reconstruction project started in June 2003. The project was to demolish the Ziqiang Building and rebuild it into the Qinxue Building (Chinese: 勤學樓) and completed on December 12, 2004. At one time, reconstruction and exploration were suspended due to the protection of the Tamalin ruins below the campus, On June 7, 2006, the observatory was completed. It was the first primary and secondary school observatory in Nantou County. In 2014, in conjunction with the "Millions of Solar Panels" project of the Energy Bureau of Ministry of Economic Affairs, the school council approved the public leasing of several buildings on campus to build about 500 square meters of solar panels, which was completed in 2015. In 2015, the school demolished the craft classroom and female staff dormitory in order to build a Library Building. In 2018, the new Library Building was completed.

==== Library and Teaching Resources Building ====
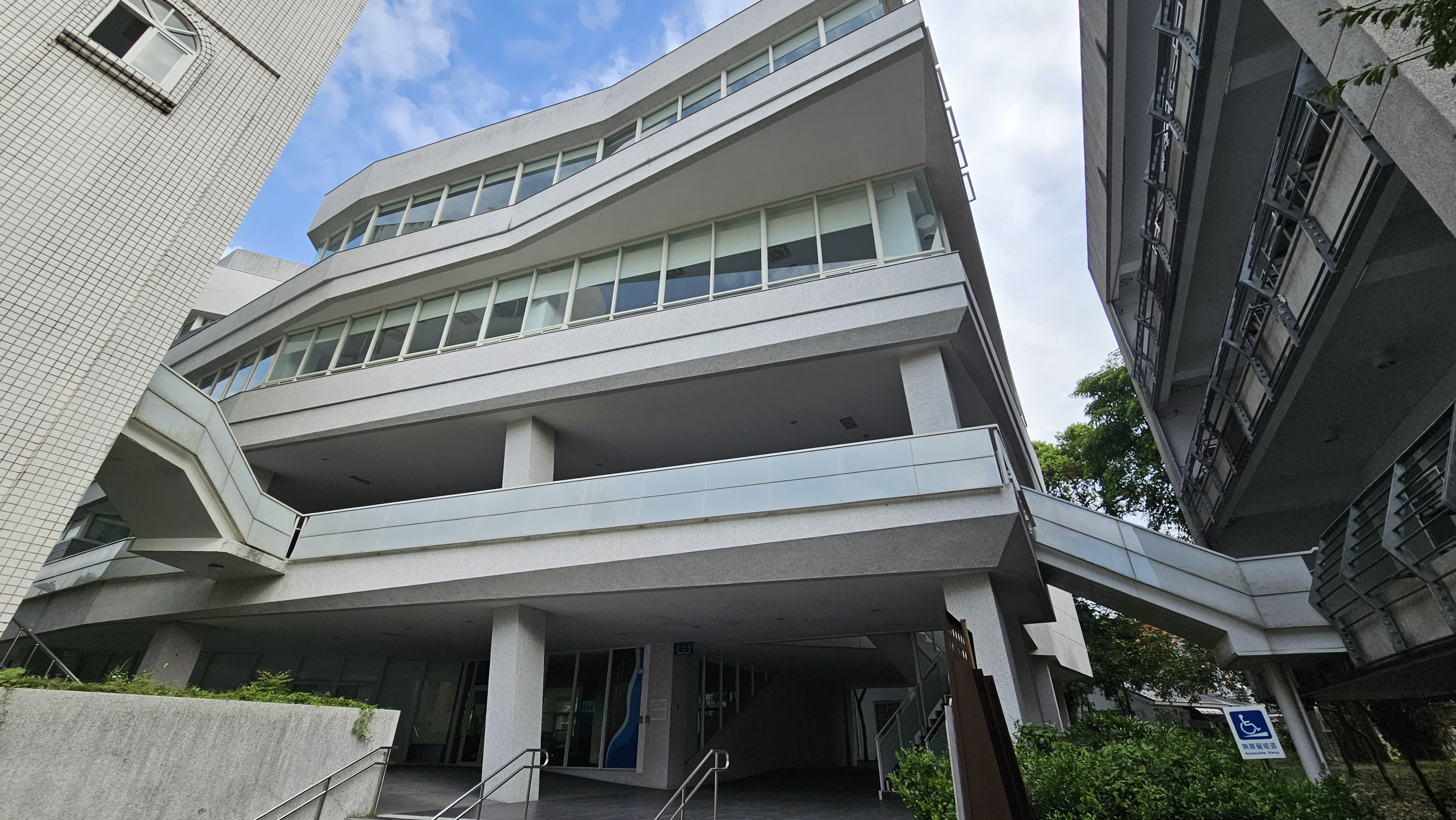
Library and Teaching Resources Building

Library and Teaching Resources Building, abbreviate as the Library Building, was completed and opened on June 29, 2018. It was designed by architect Shengyan Chen (Chinese: 陳勝彥). Because the old library was renovated by classrooms, the book collection capacity has reached its limit, and the floor cannot bear the weight of the books, so it applied in 2010 The Ministry of Education's ''Emerging Construction Project Competitive Program'' subsidizes the construction of a new library building. In 2015, the craft classroom and female staff dormitory were demolished to use as land for the new library building. When the construction started, there was controversy over the protection of underground archaeological site. The Tuzi Building has four floors, with a total building area of 958 square meters. The building adopts a high-ceiling design, with white beams and transparent glass walls as the main visual design. It has a sofa reading area, an electronic information retrieval area, and multiple group rooms. Discussion rooms, large multi-functional study rooms and other spaces can accommodate about 100,000 books.

=== Campus Art Landscape ===
Endless Life

It was created and donated by Shinian Chen (Chinese: 陳石年), the then president of the parent association, to celebrate the transformation of Puli High School into The Affiliated Senior High School of National Chi-Nan University. The material is mainly bronze and the appearance is in the shape of mature bean sprouts, symbolizing the regeneration of the school after the Jiji earthquake. On August 1, 2001, Fuhong Guo and It was unveiled at the "Thanksgiving and Farewell Tea Party" held when the two principals handover.

Gao Shan Jing Xing Excellency

Gao Shan Jing Xing (Chinese: 高山景行) Excellency was designed by artists Pei Ze Chen (Chinese: 陳培澤) and Fang Shi Lin (Chinese: 林芳仕). It was completed and unveiled after the school was rebuilt in 2006. It is located in the campus atrium. Because the school is located above the Damalin ruins, it uses granite, steel and colored glaze as materials. The steel is coated with colored glaze to form a mountain shape, and the various colors of colored glaze are used to express the various cultural layers of the Tamalin archaeological site. It commemorates the pioneers' reclamation. There is a granite humanoid next to it, represents the literati.

=== Campus Pictures ===
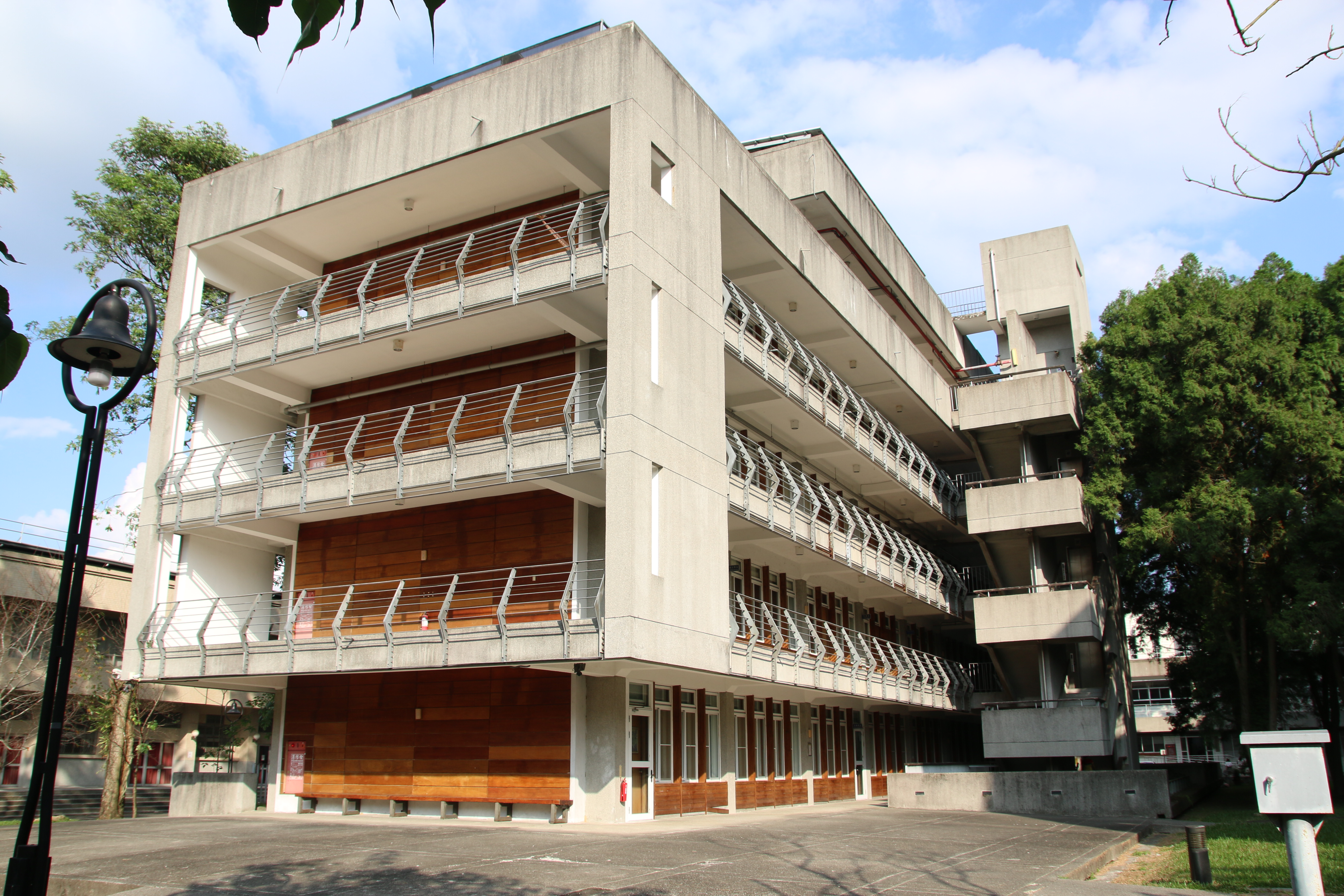
Qiuzhen Building

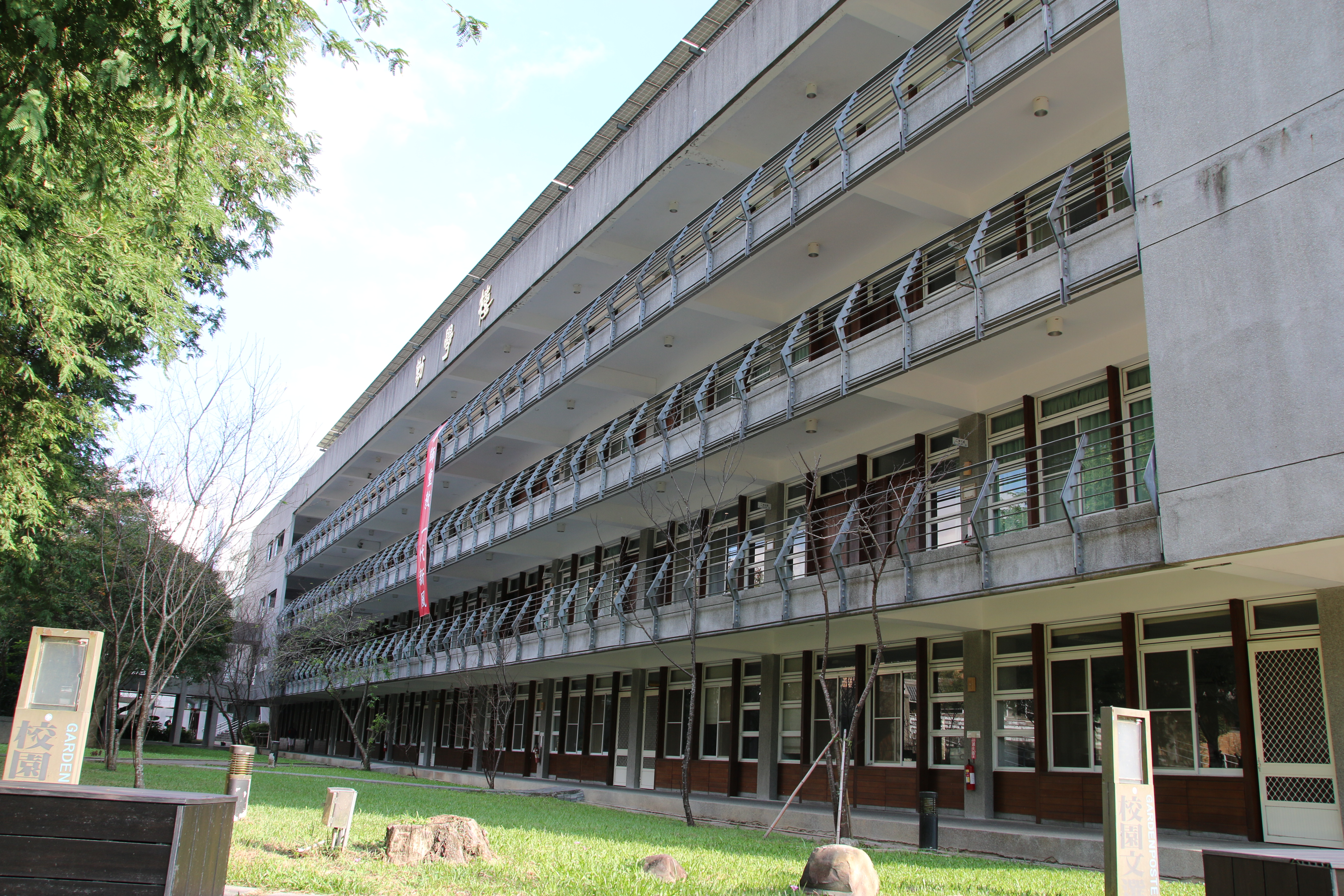
Qinxue Building

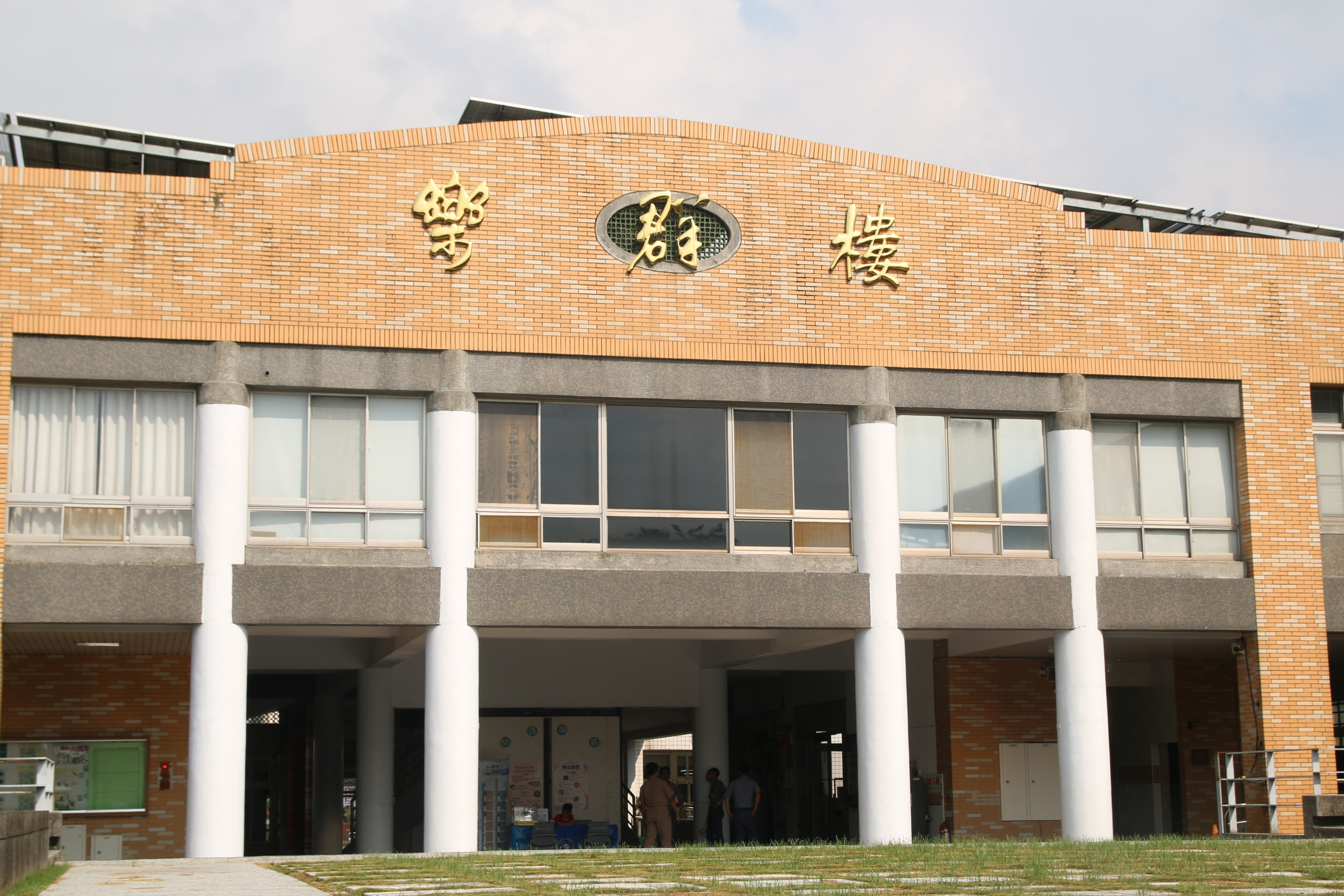
Lequn Building

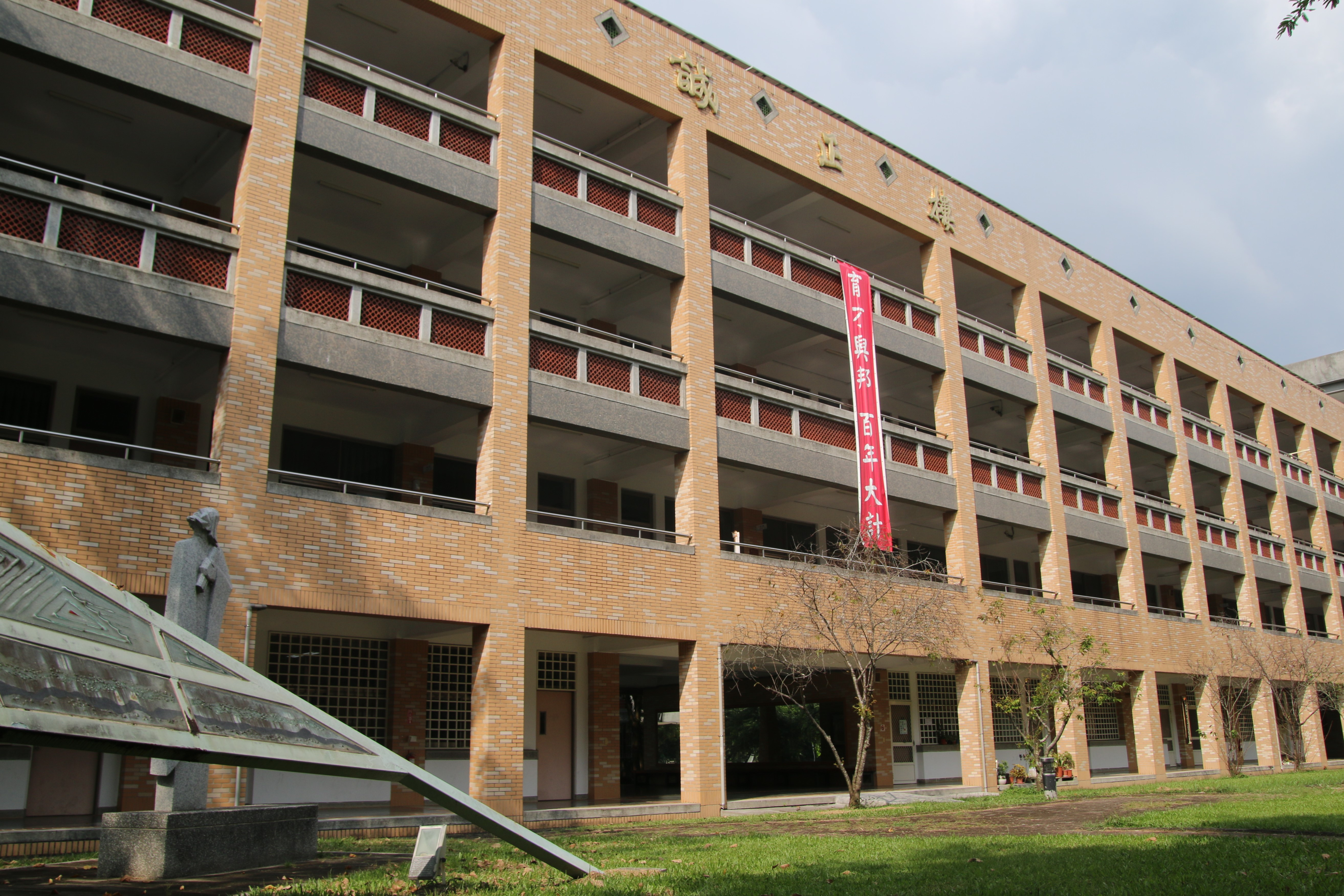
Chengzheng Building

== Teaching and activities ==
=== Classes and subjects ===
The CNASH has a comprehensive high school department, vocational department and a night school department. Among them, the technical and vocational department are all business and management groups, and the lower ones are classes and subjects for a single grade:

==== Comprehensive high school ====
- Normal Class
- Mathematics Experimental Class
- Language Experimental Class

==== Vocational education Department ====
- International Trade Section
- Business Administration Section
- Data Processing Section
- E-Commerce Section

==== Night school department ====
- Business Administration Section
- Data Processing Section

=== school activities ===
Since 2016, the school has hold "The Good Voice of the CNASH" singing competition every year by the music teachers and the Academic Affairs Office. Every spring, a day will be chosen to hold a walking event for all the teachers and students of the school to NCNU. From the side entrance of the school, pass Xingling Temple, cross the Ailan Bridge, and hike along Provincial Route 14 Zhongtan Highway to NCNU.

== Symbol of School ==
=== School Badge ===
The school badge of Puli senior high school era.

=== School Badge of Puli Senior High School Era ===
The school badge of Puli High School was designed by school teacher Wei Bian (Chinese: 卞瑋) in 1975. The Chinese abbreviation of Puli High School "埔高" is placed in the center. The triangle shape represents the three meanings of the school motto "sincerity" - wisdom, kindness and courage. The inner circle means self-improvement.

=== School Badge of The Affiliated Senior High School of National Chi-Nan University Era ===
The school badge of The Affiliated Senior High School of National Chi-Nan University was designed by school teacher Minsheng Hsu (Chinese: 許民盛) in 2001. Since the school was affiliated to NCNU after restructuring, the overall shape adopts a circle similar to the school emblem of NCNU. Blue and green are the representative colors of Puli High School's founding. The blue color represents the preservation of the founding spirit of the school. The central style is inspired by the English initials of Chi Nan University and the school's predecessor, Puli Senior High School, and also has the meaning of simplifying the emblem of Puli town.

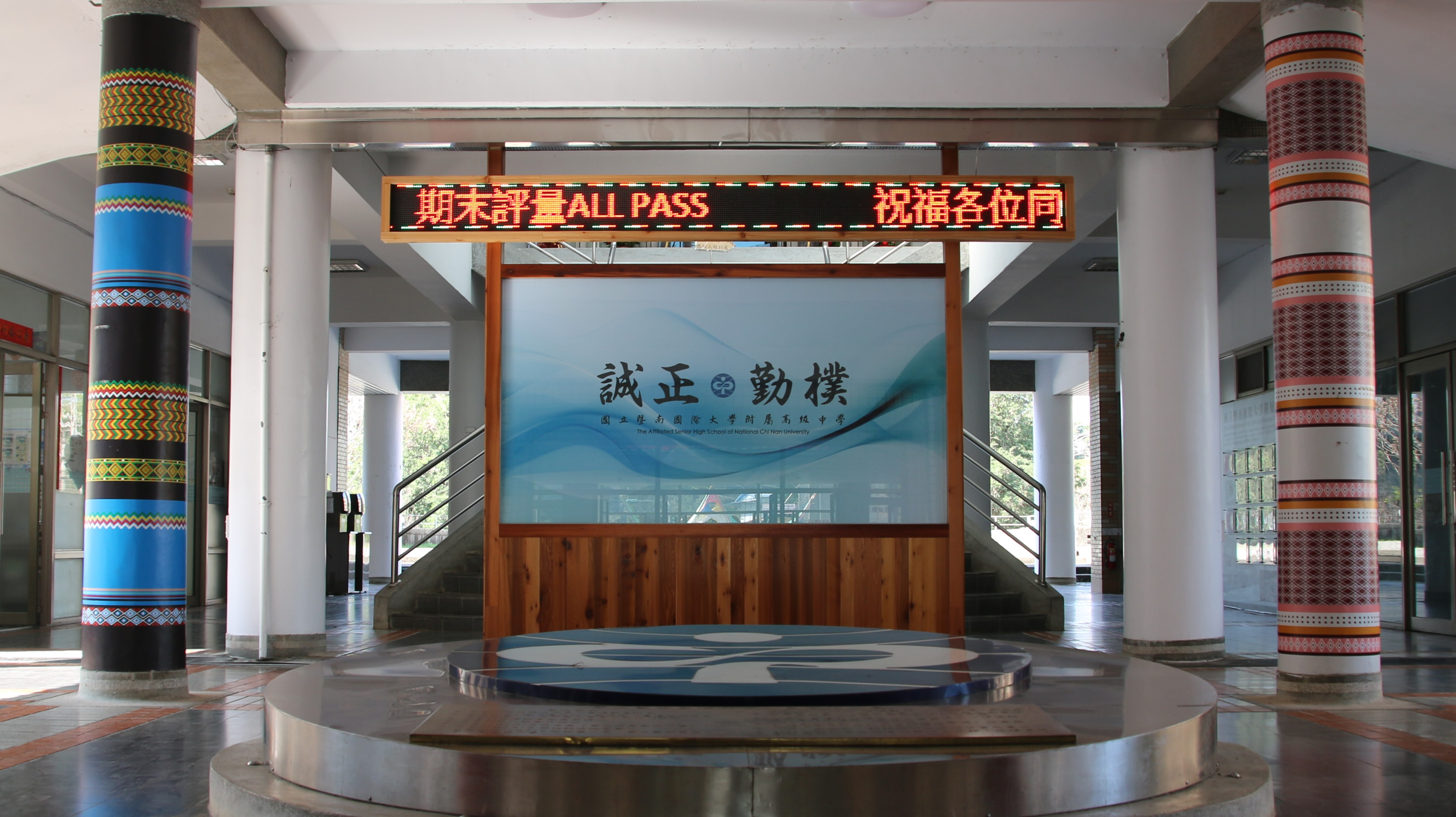
In the middle corridor of the Lequn Building of the school, the school motto is written on the bulletin board

=== School Motto ===
The "Honesty, Integrity, Diligence and Simplicity" motto was formulated by Yeqiang Zhong, the first principal of Puli High School, in 1968. Later, it was also based on "international vision", "humanistic quality", "scientific explore", "practical innovation" and "pragmatism". Use" as the school vision.

== Tamalin Archaeological Site ==
Tamalin (Chinese: 大馬璘) is a Neolithic archaeological site located on the Ailan table land in Puli. It covers campus of CNASH and Ailan Elementary School next door, as well as the Puli Christian Hospital. The school also has an art landscape created with the theme of this cultural site. CNASH has in the past triggered discussions on site destruction and protection due to school building projects.

=== Dormitory Expansion ===
In 1996, a large number of stone tool were discovered when the school was expanding its student dormitories. Many local people hoped to suspend the dormitory project through public opinion, lobbying, and visits to the principal. However, the then principal Fuhong Guo believed that the dormitory project was handled completely in accordance with the law. After discussion, the school agreed to postpone the project. At the Puli Shidunkeng site (Chinese: 石墩坑遺址) survey that year, participants called on all units to pay attention to the fact that Tamalin site would be damaged by the school building construction. However, the archaeological site monuments authority at that time ignored it because the Tamalin site was not designated as an archaeological site. (Note: In 1992, some scholars made a request to preserve and designate the current site of Tamalin Site. However, it was not designated as a site at the time of construction, and it was not announced as a county-designated site until October 30, 2009) Later in the same year, Puli local cultural and historical workers conducted four months of rescue and excavation in the ruins area before the dormitory construction.

=== 1999 Jiji Earthquake Reconstruction ===
Due to the Jiji earthquake on September 21, 1999, many parts of the school building were seriously damaged. While rebuilding the school building, they also re-opened the discussion on the Tamalin archaeological site underneath. On October 17, 2000, the Ministry of Education In order to protect the Tamalin archaeological site, the reconstruction work was required to be suspended for school-wide exploration and doing shovel test pit, which delayed the reconstruction work for several months. In order to prevent the excavation of the foundation from damaging the stone artifacts in the cultural layer during subsequent reconstruction, the Central Office of the Ministry of Education is conducting After on-site investigation, it was required that the school's reconstruction project be carried out in cooperation with cultural and historical workers, architects and experts. After entrusting the History Museum to conduct a site inspection in the teaching area, it was found that the site had been damaged many times in history, such as: At the end of the Qing Dynasty, the Pingpu people moved in to dug ditches, and Puli winery built wine storage warehouses at the period of the Republic of China, and set up the Puli High School, etc., which had no value for preservation on site, so it was decided to stop excavation in May 2001, and the Ministry of Education also commissioned National Museum of Natural Science, a cultural relics museum was planned in the new school building, and part of the land was reserved as a preservation and display area at the current site.

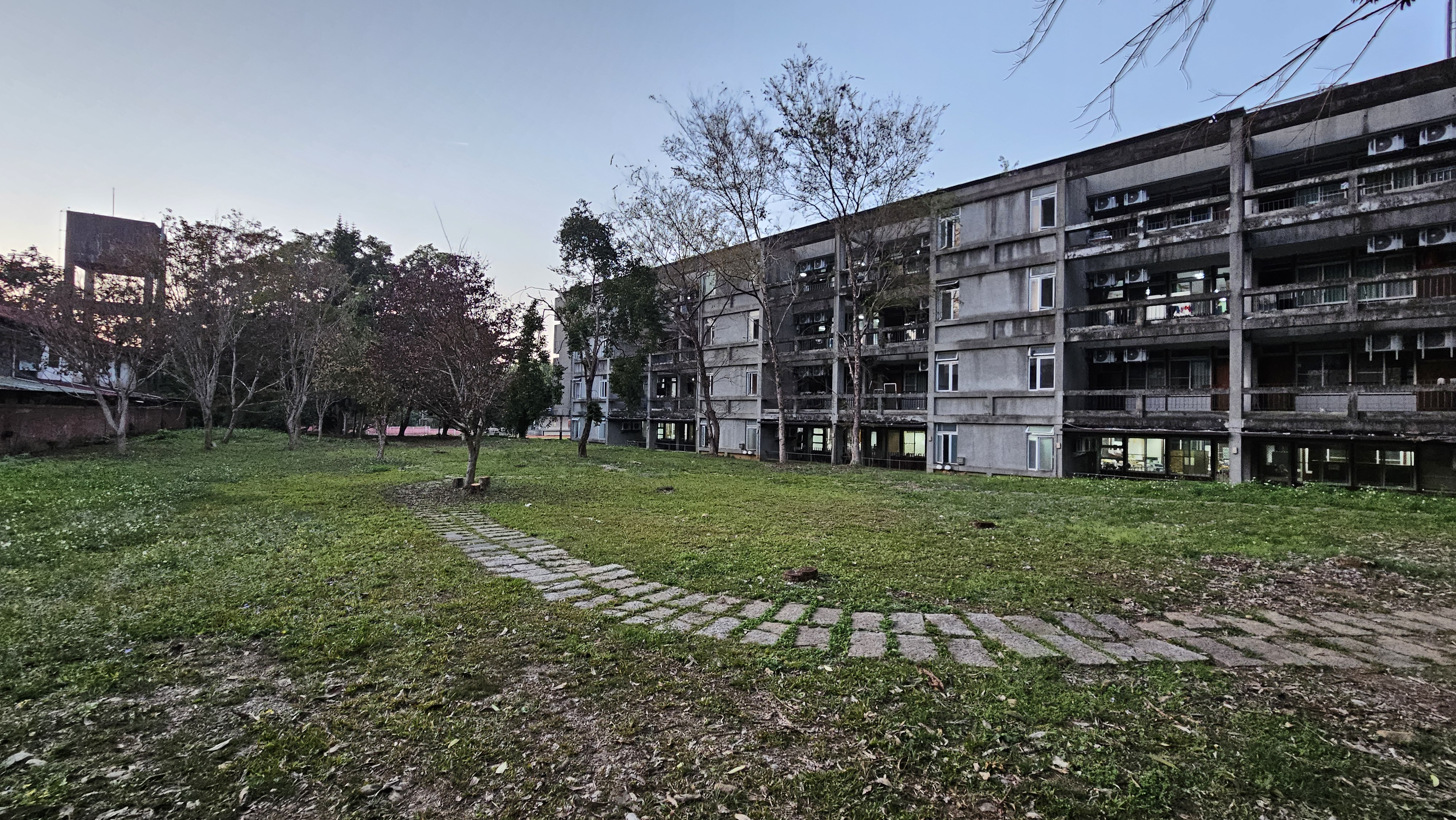
Heritage reserve behind the Chengzheng Building

=== Tamalin Archaeological Site Exhibition Hall ===
When a large number of stone tools were discovered during the expansion of the dormitory in 1996, the then principal Fuhong Guo decided to set up a "Relics Exhibition Hall Campus Planning Group" on March 4 of that year to display the stone artifacts unearthed by the school here and plan to use the museum as a The campus is an important facility for archaeological education or for the public to visit. During the reconstruction after the Jiji earthquake in 1999, the plan was to set up the exhibition hall in the basement of the new school building, and set aside a heritage reserve nearby. However, so far, Still unable to set up an exhibition hall due to lack of funds.

=== Construction of Library and Teaching Resources Building ===
In 2015, when the school demolished the old school building to build a library and teaching resource building, the cultural assets review committee believed that the campus was within the scope of the archaeological site, and conducted shovel test pit and construction monitoring in accordance with the Cultural Assets Preservation Act. Local cultural and historical workers said that this area was within the scope of the archaeological site and the school had no It is a violation of the Cultural Assets Preservation Act to start construction before conducting an exploration survey. However, the school claimed that relevant information had been carefully checked before construction to confirm that the school land was not included in the prefectural heritage sites or listed heritage sites announced by the Cultural Affairs Bureau, and that these lands had already been built during the early construction. Interfering activities such as filling and excavation were carried out. After a survey by the Cultural Affairs Bureau of Nantou County, the cultural assets review committee believed that the campus still needs to carry out relevant procedures in accordance with the Asset Preservation Law within the scope of the suspected archaeological site, and tried it with experts and scholars. Understand the current status of the underground cultural layer and conduct construction monitoring during future projects to ensure that the underground stone artifacts will not be damaged by the project.

== Anecdotes ==
=== Formerly the office of NCNU ===
In July 1992, Chi-Nan International University used Puli High School as its liaison and preparatory office during the preparatory period. In the early days of the school's establishment in July 1995, NCNU also continued to use the classrooms of Puli High School and Ailan Elementary School for about two years, Guanqun Chen (Chinese: 陳冠群), the then chief secretary of NCNU, and his staff often jokingly called NCNU the "National Chi-Nan International University Affiliated to Provincial Puli High School."

=== Three graduation ceremonies affected by the epidemic ===
On June 10, 2003, due to the SARS epidemic, many schools canceled their graduation ceremonies. However, after many discussions, the school decided to hold them as usual and changed the venue from the school to the square at the Geographic center of Taiwan at Hutou Mountain (Chinese: 虎頭山). Eighteen years later, on June 1, 2021, due to the COVID-19 epidemic, all schools at all levels across the country suspended classes and adopted online teaching. The graduation ceremony that year was held online, and the following year On June 2, 2022, also affected by the COVID-19 epidemic, the graduation ceremony was held simultaneously in physical and online live broadcasts. Students were free to choose how to attend, and the proportion of students attending physical graduation ceremonies and online graduation ceremonies About 3:1.

== Previous Principals ==
The previous principals are listed after the senior high school sector was added to Nantou County Puli Junior High School in 1958 and was upgraded to "Nantou County Puli Middle School":

English name	Chinese name	Taking Office Date	Resign Date
Principal of Nantou County Puli Middle School
Youchuan Lin	林有川	September 1958	August 26, 1969 (Note: This is the time that expiry of the term of office at Puli Junior High School)
Principal of Provincial Puli Senior High School
Yeqiang Zhong	鍾業強	July 1, 1968	February 1, 1980
Gongqin Fan	范功勤	February 1, 1980	February 1, 1985
Jun Xu	徐 均	February 1, 1985	February 2, 1990
Guowei Chen	陳國偉	February 2, 1990	August 2, 1995
Fuhong Guo	郭孚宏	August 2, 1995	January 31, 2000
Principal of National Puli Senior High School
Fuhong Guo	郭孚宏	February 1, 2000	July 31, 2001
Yongfu Zhang	張永福	August 1, 2001	December 13, 2001
Principal of The Affiliated Senior High School of National Chi-Nan University
Yongfu Zhang	張永福	December 13, 2001	January 31, 2006
Fanghua Xiao	蕭芳華	February 1, 2006	March 31, 2007
Qidong Chen	陳啓東	April 1, 2007	July 31, 2015
Zhengyan Zhang	張正彥	August 1, 2015	July 31, 2022
Fangbo Huang	黃方伯	August 1, 2022	
