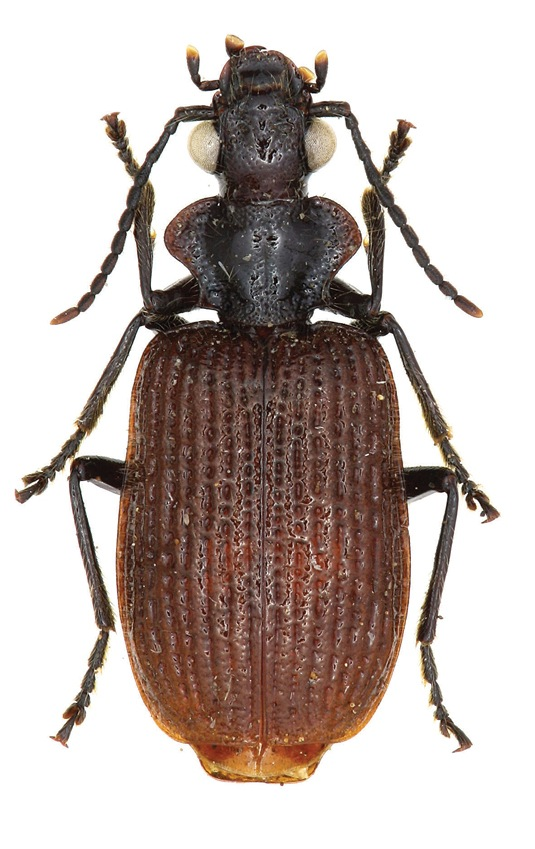

Scientific classification
- Kingdom: Animalia
- Phylum: Arthropoda
- Clade: Pancrustacea
- Class: Insecta
- Order: Coleoptera
- Suborder: Adephaga
- Family: Carabidae
- Genus: Lachnoderma
- Species: L. asperum

Binomial name
- Lachnoderma asperum (Bates, 1883)

= Lachnoderma asperum =

Species of beetle

Lachnoderma asperum is a species of ground beetles from the genus Lachnoderma.

== Description ==
The species are brownish colored with white eyes.

== Distribution ==
The species live in East Asia, presumably China and Taiwan. They could be found in Chinese cities such as: Nantou, Puli, and Shizaitou.
