= Chang Tsai Mei =

Taiwanese politician

Chang Tsai Mei (Chinese: 張蔡美; born 1938) is a Taiwanese politician.

== Education ==
Chang Tsai earned a master's degree in business administration from the City University of Seattle.

== Political career ==
Chang Tsai was a member of the Kuomintang and was active in the party's women's association. Chang Tsai served on the Hsinchu County Council and the Hsinchu City Council before her 1994 election to the Taiwan Provincial Assembly. She then represented the Hsinchu City Constituency for two terms in the Legislative Yuan on behalf of the Kuomintang, winning consecutive legislative elections in 1998 and 2001.

In 2003, during her second term on the Legislative Yuan, Chang Tsai discussed electronic waste originating from compact discs. Later that year, the Association Monitoring the Nomination of Grand Justices placed her on a list of worst-performing legislators. After losing a July 2004 party primary to Ko Chun-hsiung, Chang Tsai left the Kuomintang, joined the Alliance of Independent Lawmakers, and lost the subsequent general election to Ko.

== Controversy ==
Chang Tsai and seven others were indicted on charges of bribery in 2008. The charges stemmed from her 2003 endorsement of the Oral Healthcare Act. The Taiwan High Court's first ruling in October 2010 declared that the eight were not guilty. The verdict was overruled in another decision by the same court, issued in September 2011. An appeal heard by the Supreme Court resulted in a 2016 decision in which Chang Tsai was one of six defendants found not guilty.
