= Everlasting Glory =

- Film poster
- Directed by: Ting Shan-hsi
- Produced by: Koo Chen-Fu
- Starring: Ko Chun-hsiung; Hsu Feng
- Cinematography: Lin Wen-Chin
- Edited by: Wang Chin-Chen
- Music by: Yang Ping-Chung; Steven Liu Chia-Chang
- Production company: Central Motion Pictures
- Release date: July 19, 1976 (Taiwan)
- Running time: 115 minutes
- Country: Taiwan
- Language: Mandarin

Everlasting Glory (Chinese: 英烈千秋) is a 1976 Taiwanese historical war drama film directed by Ting Shan-hsi and starring Ko Chun-hsiung and Hsu Feng in the Second Sino-Japanese War. It was filmed in Taiwan.

== Synopsis ==
Gen. Cheng Tsu-chung, the Mars of China, is held in high esteem, even by his enemies.

== Cast ==
- Ko Chun-hsiung
- Hsu Feng
