= Taomi Village =

Coordinates: 23°56′29.1″N 120°55′11.8″E

Taomi Village (Chinese: 桃米里) is an urban village situated in Puli Township, Nantou County, Taiwan along the route to Sun Moon Lake. Before 1999, the agricultural village was facing decline due to Taiwan’s rapid industrialization. During the Taiwan 1999 Jiji earthquake, 70% of the small village was destroyed - 168 out of the 369 houses were completely destroyed, and 60 were partially destroyed. Instead of being absorbed in sorrow, the village turned the crisis into an opportunity to not only reconstruct, but also to re-brand the village. 10 years on, Taomi village prides itself as an eco-village, with Paper Dome as the centerpiece. The Paper Dome originated in Japan, and is the embodiment of the love and mutual assistance between Taiwan and Japan community reconstruction experience sharing in addition to being the heart of Taomi Village.

== Rejuvenating Taomi village ==
The most devastating earthquake in Taiwan in the 20th century occurred in the early morning of September 21, 1999. The 1999 Jiji earthquake killed over 2,000 people, injured over 11,000 and completely destroyed or damaged over 85,000 houses.

168 out of 369 buildings were completely damaged, and the bodies of the 20 victims were never found. Before the earthquake, Taomi residents used to plant and sell bamboo. It was an ordinary village in the rural area like thousands of other small villages all around Taiwan. But the 921 earthquake, as it came to be widely known, destroyed bamboo fields and deprived people of their means of subsistence.

Rebuilding Taomi village required a lot of effort and self-sacrifice. People couldn’t plant bamboo any more so they started to look for new ideas, they tried to find what is unique about their place. The idea of Taomi as an eco-village was born. Scientists were invited and they found that this area has an unprecedented diversity of fauna. Taomi village is situated in a valley. There are wetlands and waterfalls, and the place is very natural and not influenced very much by people. Of the 29 species of frogs in Taiwan, Taomi boasts of 23 of them. Moreover, Taomi has around 60 kinds of dragonflies (153 kinds in all of Taiwan) and 72 kinds of birds (450 kinds in the whole country).

Taomi residents thus found out that they possess a unique nature treasure and decided to take advantage of this fact. Of course it wasn't easy to convince everybody that frogs and dragonflies could bring money to the village. But people did not have jobs after the earthquake so it was a good time to engage them and teach them about Taomi's natural environment. The New Homeland foundation created a work program under a government contract: residents could earn 600 NT$ helping to clean up the village, but they had to attend classes about the local environment every weekend. Professional teachers were invited. After a few months of study, 30 Taomi residents earned certificates and became a tour guides for tourists. Moreover, women from the community learned how to cook using local products so they could open restaurants in Taomi.

The community also found work for older residents, whose age range from 40 to 80 made it difficult for them to learn a new profession. They became responsible for the construction of wetland parks, educational and recreation areas. The area was rebuilt in an ecologically friendly manner. A number of ponds for frogs were made. Before people used a lot of cement for building and now they started to use stone. They also replanted a lot of trees there. Former rice fields were transformed into a wetland that resulted in an increase in the number of species in Taomi. More than 13,000 fireflies now attract visitors from all around the country every April and May.

Since around 20 ecological B&Bs were opened in Taomi, tourists have the opportunity to slow down their pace of life and commune with Mother Nature. Every B&B is unique, and every B&B’s owner has his own story.

Therefore, the Taomi community managed not only to rebuild their village after a devastating earthquake, but also to create one of the most successful ecological tourist attractions in Taiwan and the world. Specialists from all around the world come to Taomi to learn about eco-tourism. 7000 tourists visited Taomi in 2001 and 16000 in 2002. In 2010 the number of tourists who came to Taomi to visit the wetlands and observe frogs, dragonflies and fireflies reached 400,000 people.

== See also ==
- Administrative divisions of Taiwan
- Village (Taiwan)
