= Takatori Catholic Church =

Coordinates: 34°38′57″N 135°08′24″E

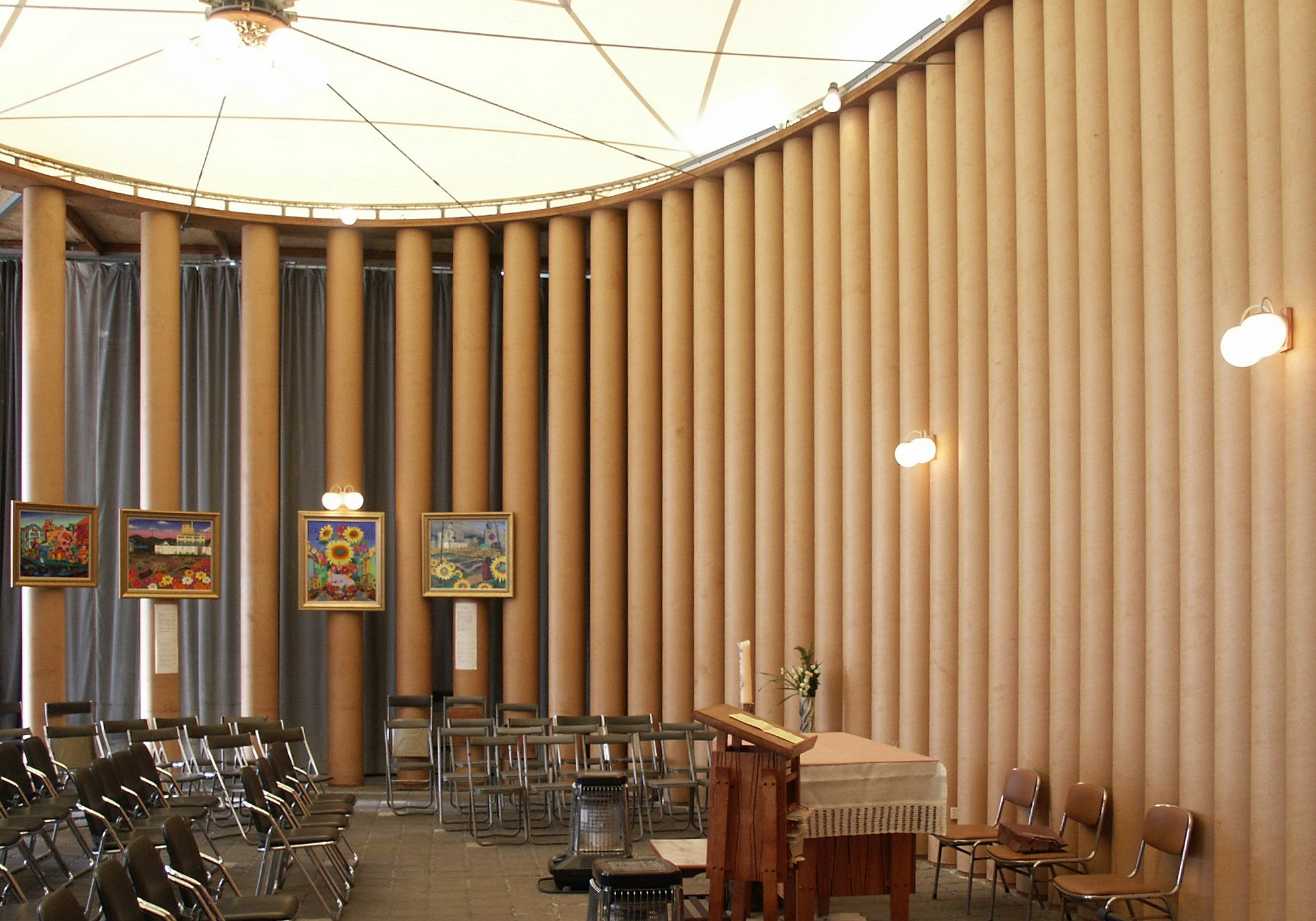
One of the most famous paper tube structures: temporary church building erected in 1995 after the Great Hanshin earthquake.

Takatori Catholic Church (Katorikku Takatori Kyōkai (カトリックたかとり教会)) is a Catholic church in Nagata-ku, Kobe, Japan. It is a fifteen-minute walk from Takatori Station in Kobe, Hyōgo Prefecture, Japan.

== History ==
The church was founded in 1927 and was consecrated in 1929.

== Earthquake and Takatori Church ==
On January 17, 1995, the Great Hanshin earthquake destroyed the original church building as well as other structures in the vicinity. The church became an increasingly important part of the community in the wake of the earthquake and during the recovery and rebuilding that took place afterward.

=== Takatori Community Center ===
After the earthquake, Takatori parish, under the guidance of Father Hiroshi Kanda, was turned into a disaster relief center, named the "Takatori Church Rescue Base", and later renamed to the "Takatori Rescue Base". The Rescue Base offered a place to stay for volunteers who gathered from around Japan. Disaster relief such as soup kitchens and cleaning of debris was organized at the Base. Communications regarding the disaster and relief efforts for the various non-Japanese speaking members of the community were disseminated from the church.

In 2000, the Takatori Church Rescue Base, was reorganized into a non-profit entity called the "Takatori Community Center." The three main groups that utilize the center are secular local community representatives, the Takatori Church and non-profits based in the Takatori district. Currently, Hiroshi Kanda is the chair of its board of trustees.

In 2006, the Takatori Community Center was awarded by the Japan Foundation, a government funded non-profit, honoring its community-based cultural exchange.

=== Paper Dome ===
On September 17, 1995, in light of the earthquake, a temporary church building made of paper tubes was designed and built on a pro-bono basis by Shigeru Ban, an internationally known Japanese architect who is renowned for his paper tube structures and buildings. This temporary church structure was nicknamed the "Paper Dome".

After the Takatori parish community decided to build a larger, permanent church building, the "Paper Dome" was deconstructed in 2005. Arrangements were made to donate it to a Catholic community in Nantou County Taiwan, which had suffered from the (21 September 1999) 921 earthquake; the parts were shipped to Taiwan in 2006, and after two years of planning, were reconstructed at the new site in 2008. The reconstruction took four months, and it is used as a place of worship as well as a tourist attraction. The article Paper Dome about the current installation gives more details about its original construction.
