= Hsinchu City Constituency =

Constituency of the Legislative Yuan of Taiwan

Coordinates: 24°48′17″N 120°58′17″E

Hsinchu City
- Single-member constituency for the Legislative Yuan
- District: Hsinchu City
- Electorate: 338,323

Current constituency
- Created: 2008
- Number of members: 1

Hsinchu City is represented in the Legislative Yuan since 2008 by one at-large single-member constituency (Hsinchu Constituency,Chinese: 新竹市選舉區; pinyin: Xīnzhú Shì Xuǎnjǔ Qū).

== Current district ==
- Hsinchu City

== Legislators ==
Kuomintang Democratic Progressive Party People First Party
New Party Taiwan Farmers' Party Independent

Election	Taiwan Province 18th constituency		
1989	Hsu Wu-sheng		
	Hsinchu City		
1992	Ker Chien-ming	Hsieh Chi-ta	
1995	Ker Chien-ming	Lin Junq-tzer	
	Hsinchu City		
1998	Ker Chien-ming	Lin Junq-tzer	Chang Tsai Mei
2001	Ker Chien-ming	Lu Hsueh-chang	Chang Tsai Mei
2004	Ker Chien-ming	Lu Hsueh-chang	Ko Chun-hsiung
	Hsinchu City		
2008 7th	Lu Hsueh-chang		
2012 8th	Lu Hsueh-chang		
2016 9th	Ker Chien-ming		
2020 10th	Cheng Cheng-chien		
2024 11th	Cheng Cheng-chien		

== Election results ==
=== 2024 ===
Legislative Election 2024: Hsinchu City Constituency
Party	Candidate	Votes	%	±%
Kuomintang	Cheng Cheng-chien	92,014	35.23	
DPP	Lin Chih-Chieh	83,298	31.89	
Independent	Ko Mei Lan	51,663	19.78	
NPP	Chiu Hsien-Chih	33,023	12.64	
Judicial Reform Party	Yang Ching-Hua	566	0.22	
Independent	Wang Rong De	405	0.16	
Institutional Island of Saving the World	Chao Fu Long	249	0.10	
Majority		8,716	3.34	
Total valid votes		261,218		
Kuomintang hold		Swing		

=== 2016 ===
2016 Legislative election
	Elected			Runner-up		
Incumbent	Candidate	Party	Votes (%)	Candidate	Party	Votes (%)
Kuomintang; Lu Hsueh-chang	Ker Chien-ming	DPP	41.33%	Cheng Cheng-chien	Kuomintang	36.46%
