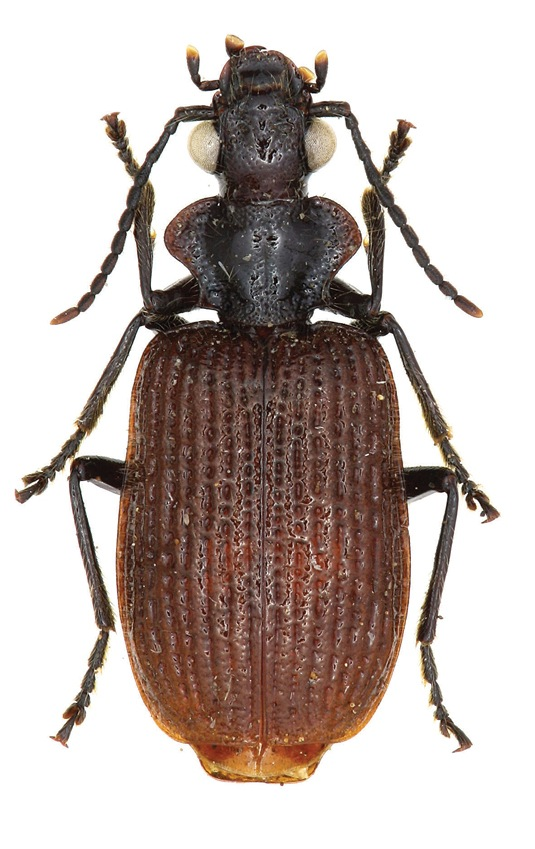
- Lachnoderma asperum

Scientific classification
- Domain: Eukaryota
- Kingdom: Animalia
- Phylum: Arthropoda
- Class: Insecta
- Order: Coleoptera
- Suborder: Adephaga
- Family: Carabidae
- Subfamily: Lebiinae
- Tribe: Lebiini
- Subtribe: Physoderina
- Genus: Lachnoderma; W.J.MacLeay, 1873

= Lachnoderma =

Genus of beetles

Lachnoderma is a genus in the beetle family Carabidae. There are about 14 described species in Lachnoderma.

== Species ==
These 14 species belong to the genus Lachnoderma:

- Lachnoderma asperum Bates, 1883 (China, Japan, and Taiwan)
- Lachnoderma biguttatum Bates, 1892 (China, Nepal, India, Myanmar)
- Lachnoderma chebaling Tian & Deuve, 2001 (China)
- Lachnoderma cheni Tian & Deuve, 2001 (China)
- Lachnoderma cinctum W.J.MacLeay, 1873 (Australia)
- Lachnoderma confusum Tian & Deuve, 2001 (China)
- Lachnoderma foveolatum Sloane, 1915 (New Guinea and Australia)
- Lachnoderma metallicum Tian & Deuve, 2001 (China)
- Lachnoderma nideki Louwerens, 1952 (Indonesia)
- Lachnoderma philippinense Jedlicka, 1934 (Philippines)
- Lachnoderma polybothris Louwerens, 1967 (Philippines)
- Lachnoderma tricolor Andrewes, 1926 (India, Vietnam, Singapore, Indonesia)
- Lachnoderma vietnamense Kirschenhofer, 1996 (Vietnam)
- Lachnoderma yingdeicum Tian & Deuve, 2001 (China)
