= Ko Chun-hsiung =

Taiwanese actor, director and politician

- 柯俊雄
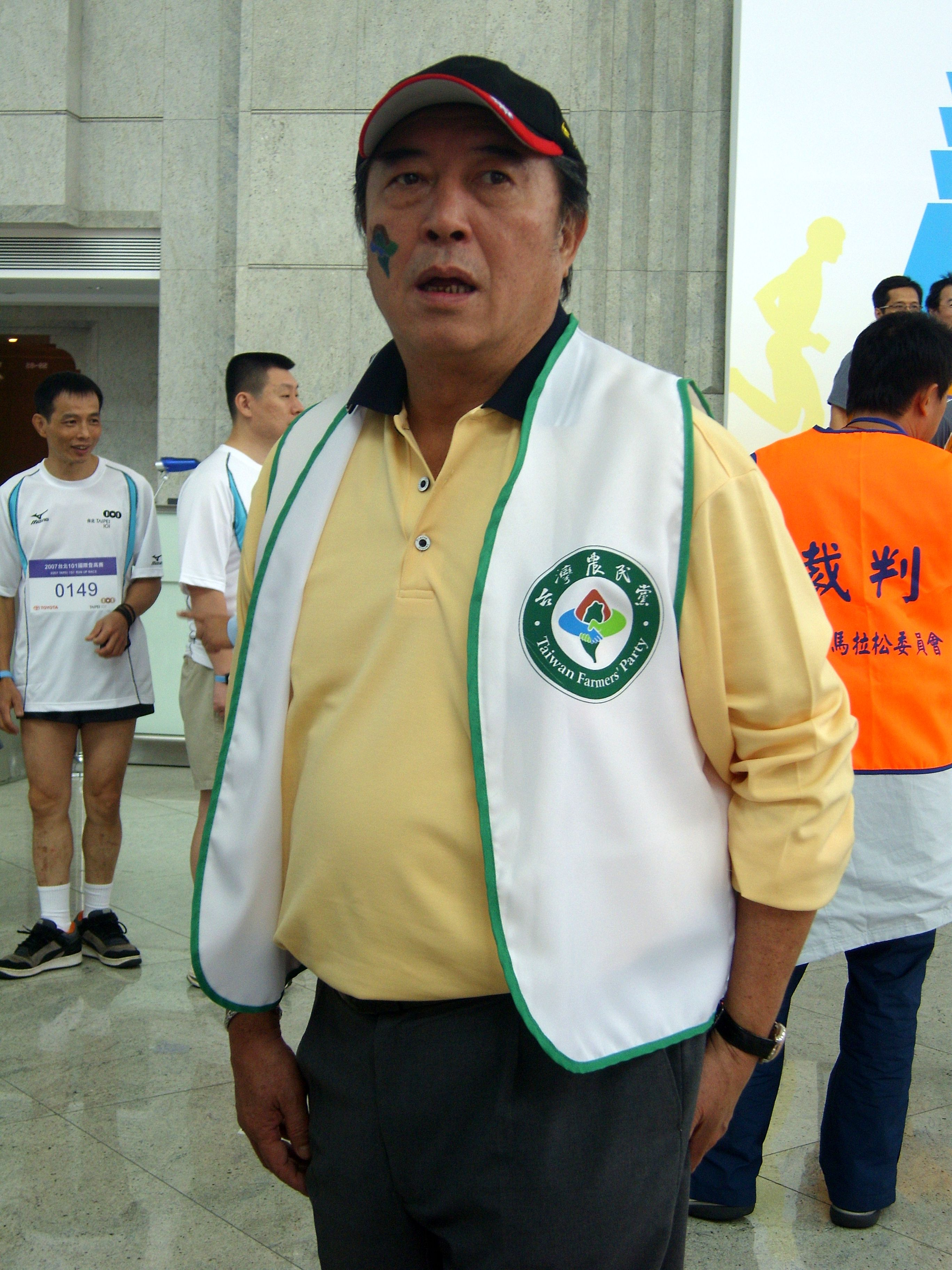
- Ko Chun-hsiung in Taipei in 2007.
- Born: Ko Chun-liang (柯俊良); 15 January 1945; Kaohsiung, Taiwan
- Died: 6 December 2015 (aged 70); Taipei, Taiwan
- Education: National Taiwan University of Arts (BFA); University of Tokyo; University of Hong Kong
- Occupations: Actor, director, politician
- Years active: 1965—2015
- Political party: Kuomintang; Taiwan Farmers' Party (2007—2008)
- Spouses: Chang Mei-yao (m. 1970; div. 2004) Tsai Qinghua (m. 2005–2015)
- Children: Ko Yishan, with Chang Mei-yao; Ko Pinyin, with Chang Mei-yao; Ko Jianyu, with Tsai Qinghua; Ko Zier, with Tsai Qinghua

Ko Chun-hsiung (Chinese: 柯俊雄; pinyin: Kē Jùnxióng; Pe̍h-ōe-jī: Koa Chùn-hiông; 15 January 1945 – 6 December 2015) was a Taiwanese actor, director and politician. He had been acting since the 1960s and had appeared in more than 200 films.

His career accolades included three Golden Horse Awards, two Asia Pacific Film Festival Awards for Best Actor, a Panama International Film Festival Award for Best Actor. In 2005, Chinese Film Association of Performance Art named Ko on the list of 100 Outstanding Artists in Chinese Film (1905 - 2004).

== Life ==
=== Early life and education ===
Ko was born in Kaohsiung. During Taiwan under Japanese rule, he attended Kaohsiung No.2 School and graduated from National Taiwan University of Arts, he also studied at the University of Tokyo and St. John's College, University of Hong Kong.

=== Acting career ===
Ko began his career by appearing in small roles before 1965. He appeared in The Silent Wife later that year. In 1967, Ko starred as Feng Ze in Ching-Zue Bai's Lonely Seventeen, for which he won his first Best Actor Award at the Asia Pacific Film Festival. In 1974, Ko starred as Zhang Zizhong in the historical film The Everlasting Glory, which earned Ko his second Best Actor Award at the Asia Pacific Film Festival. In 1976, Ko acted in the historical film Eight Hundred Heroes directed by Ting Shan-hsi, playing the role of Xie Jinyuan, he won a Golden Horse Award.

Ko won the Best Actor Award at the 1979 Golden Horse Awards for his performance in A Teacher of Great Soldiers.

In 1981, Ko self-directed and performed in My Grandfather, which earned him a Best Actor Award at the Panama International Film Festival. In 1989, Ko starred as Duan Yihu, reuniting him with co-star Jackie Chan, who played Guo Zhenhua, in the romantic comedy film Miracles, which were highly praised by audience. In 1999, Ko filmed in Cao Cao, he received the Best Actor Award at the 36th Golden Horse Awards. In 2012, Ko participated in the Taiwanese-language television drama Feng Shui Family.

=== Political career ===
Ko became involved in politics in 1990.

In 1996, Ko stood unsuccessfully in the Provisional Legislative Council Election in British Hong Kong.

Ko defeated incumbent legislator Chang Tsai Mei in a July 2004 Kuomintang party primary, and represented Hsinchu City Constituency in the Legislative Yuan from 1 February 2005 to 31 January 2008.

In 2007, Ko joined the Taiwan Farmers' Party, but was not reelected in the 2008 legislative elections.

== Personal life ==
Ko was twice married. Originally wed to actress Chang Mei-yao in 1970, he became the father of two children, Ko Yishan (柯懿珊) and Ko Pinyin (柯品吟). They divorced in 2004, as Ko was involved in an affair with Tsai Qinghua (蔡清樺), who Ko married the next year. Ko's second marriage also produced two children, Ko Jianyu (柯鑒育) and Ko Zier (柯姿而). Chang, Ko's first wife, died in 2012.

== Death ==
Ko died on 6 December 2015 at Tri-Service General Hospital in Taipei, a year after being diagnosed with lung cancer. He was 70.

== Works ==
=== Film ===
Year	English Title	Chinese Title	Role
1963		《義犬救主》	
1963		《流浪賣花姑娘》	
1964		《天字第一號》	
1965		《一江春水向東流》	
1965	The Silent Wife	《啞女情深》	
1966		《橋》	
1966		《貞節牌坊》	
1967		《壯志淩雲》	
1967		《第六個夢》	
1967		《春歸何處》	
1967		《梨山春曉》	
1967	Lonely Seventeen	《寂寞的十七歲》	Feng Ze
1967	I Hate You Deeply	《恨你入骨》	
1968	Fallen Petals	《落花時節》	
1969	Storm over the Yang-tse River	《揚子江風雲》	
1970	Bye, My Lover	《再見阿郎》	
1970	Home Sweet Home	《家在台北》	
1970	I Want You	《我要你》	
1971		《愛你一萬倍》	
1971	Life and Mother	《母與女》	
1971		《說謊的丈夫》	
1971	Happiness and Joy	《歡天喜地》	
1971		《真假太太》	
1971	Five Plus Five	《五對佳偶》	
1971	Splendid Love Affairs	《難忘負心人》	
1972		《東南西北風》	
1972	Pei Shih	《佩詩》	
1972	Love is Smoke	《輕煙》	
1972	The Perfect Match	《門當戶對》	
1972	Crimes Are To Be Paid	《五虎摧花》	
1973		《天使之吻》	
1973		《大三元》	
1973	Father, Husband, Son	《我父、我夫、我子》	
1973		《大阿哥》	
1973		《心蘭的故事》	
1973	The Devils Treasure	《黑夜怪客》	
1973	Haze in the Sunset	《煙雨斜陽》	
1973	The Jilte	《負心的人續集》	
1974		《彩雲片片》	
1974	The Everlasting Glory	《英烈千秋》	
1974	Spring Comes Not Again	《不再有春天》	
1974	The Looks of Hong Kong	《香港屋簷下》	
1975	The Bedeviled	《心魔》	
1975	Devil Crows	《邪魔》	
1975	Victory	《梅花》	
1976	Painted Waves of Love	《浪花》	
1976	The Star	《星語》	
1976	Taipei 66	《台北66》	
1976	Rhythm of the Wave	《海韻》	
1976	The Trap	《陷阱》	
1976	Eight Hundred Heroes	《八百壯士》	
1977		《愛有明天》	
1977		《綠色山莊》	
1977		《秋詩篇篇》	
1977		《人在天涯》	
1977		《風雨朝陽》	
1978	A Teacher of Great Soldiers	《黃埔軍魂》	
1979	Gone With Honor	《香火》	
1979	The Brave Ones	《強渡關山》	
1979	Qi Jiguang	《戚繼光》	
1979	Qiu Lian	《秋蓮》	
1980	The Coldest Winter in Peking	《皇天後土》	
1980	Mission over the Eagle Castle	《血濺冷鷹堡》	
1981	The Frogman	《大地勇士》	
1981	The Battle for the Republic of China	《辛亥雙十》	
1981		《上海大亨》	
1981		《大爺》	
1981		《黑色大亨》	
1981	The Professional Killer	《職業兇手》	
1981	Offend the Law of God	《怒犯天條》	
1982		《黑色婚禮》	
1982	Steamrolling	《人肉戰車》	
1982	Days In the Army	《動員令》	
1982		《血濺歸鄉路》	
1982	The Head Hunter	《獵頭》	
1982		《慧眼識英雄》	
1982	Attack Force Z	《Z字特工隊》	
1982	My Grandfather	《我的爺爺》	
1982		《甲子玄機》	
1983		《破網補情天》	
1983		《亡命黑名單》	
1983	My Mother	《我的媽媽》	
1983	The Lost Generation (20 Years of Feng Shui)	《風水二十年》	
1984		《不歸路》	
1984		《圣戰千秋》	
1984		《天天天亮》	
1985		《孤戀花》	
1986		《愛是做鬼也愛》	
1986	From Here to Prosperity	《奪寶計上計》	
1986	I am a Chinese	《我是中國人》	
1986	The Heroic Pioneers	《唐山過台灣》	
1986	The Kinmen Bombs	《金門炮戰》	
1987		《起床號》	
1987		《魔鬼戰士》	
1987		《旗正飄飄》	
1987	Tragic Hero	《英雄好漢》	
1987	Somewhere My Love	《不歸路》	
1987	Brotherhood	《義本無言》	
1987	Rich and Famous	《江湖情》	
1987	The Kinmen Bombs	《八二三炮戰》	
1987	Yes, Sir	《報告班長》	
1987	Strawman	《稻草人》	
1988	City Warriors	《殺出銅鑼灣》	
1988		《笑聲淚影大陸行》	
1988	Yes, Sir 2	《報告班長2》	
1988	The Story of Haybo	《喜寶》	
1988	The Dragon Family	《龍之家族》	
1989	Fight to Survive	《我在江湖》	
1989	Miracles	《奇跡》	Duan Yihu
1989	Burning Ambition	《龍之爭霸》	
1990	Triad Story	《江湖最後一個大佬》	
1990	A Home Too Far	《異域》	
1991	Island of Fire	《火燒島》	Prison Chief
1991	Retreat of the Godfather	《大哥讓位》	
1992	Requital	《五湖四海》	
1993	End of The Road	《異域之末路英雄》	
1994	Amassing Stories	《野店》	
1995	Remember M Remember E	《哪有一天不想你》	
1998	Cao Cao	《一代梟雄曹操》	
1998		《闖將》	
1998	Unexpected Challenges	《靈與慾》	
2001	The Last Salute	《報告總司令》	

=== Television ===
Year	English Title	Chinese Title	Role
1983	Days in Xiang River	《香江歲月》	
1998		《舉頭三尺有神明》	
2003	Crystal Boys	《孽子》	A Qing's father
2004	My Boyfriend Is A Superstar	《我的明星男友》	Guan Zixiong
2011	Independent Heroes	《廉政英雄》	Biao Su/ Zhang Guohao
2011	Father and Son	《父與子》	Wang Dazhu
2012	Feng Shui Family	《風水世家》	Gao Shenhuang

== Awards ==
Year	Work	Award	Result	Notes
1968	Lonely Seventeen	Asia Pacific Film Festival for Best Actor Award	Won	
1975	The Everlasting Glory	Asia Pacific Film Festival for Best Actor Award	Won	
1976	800 Heroes	Golden Horse Award	Won	
1979	A Teacher of Great Soldiers	Golden Horse Award for Best Actor	Won	
1981	My Grandfather	Panama International Film Festival for Best Actor	Won	
1999	Cao Cao	Golden Horse Award for Best Actor	Won	
2005		100 Outstanding Artists in Chinese Film (1905 - 2004)	Won	
