= Takatori Station (Hyōgo) =

Railway station in Kobe, Japan

Coordinates: 34°39′05″N 135°08′07″E

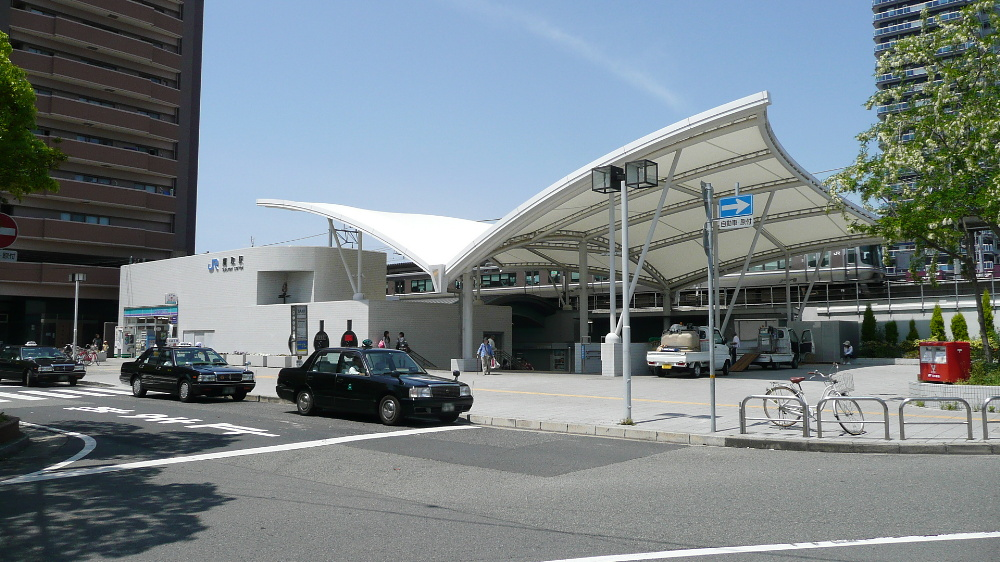
Takatori Station

Takatori Station (鷹取駅, Takatori Eki) is a railway station on the JR West San'yō Main Line (JR Kobe Line) in Suma-ku, Kobe, Hyōgo Prefecture, Japan. Only local trains stop at Takatori Station. The station has an unusual layout. It has one island platform serving two tracks, and additional tracks on the northern side for Special Rapid Service (新快速, Shin-Kaisoku), express trains and freight trains. While the Akashi-bound express track is immediately adjacent to the station and is viewable from the platform, the Kobe-bound express track is separated from the platform by a local track, the aforementioned express track, a series of additional tracks and an active freight-related loading area. As a result, the Kobe-bound express track is located roughly 60 meters north of the island platform and is usually not in full view from the platform.

Takatori Catholic Church designed by Shigeru Ban, internationally known Japanese architect, is a fifteen-minute walk from Takatori Station.

In 2016, Japanese geologists at the Riken Advanced Institute for Computational Science used the seismic waves recorded at Takatori station during the Great Hanshin earthquake of 1995 to analyze the seismic response of a reinforced concrete pier.

== Adjacent stations ==
«	Service	»
West Japan Railway Company (JR West)
Sanyo Main Line (JR Kobe Line)
Special Rapid Service: Does not stop at this station
Rapid Service: Does not stop at this station
Shin-Nagata	Local	Suma-Kaihinkōen

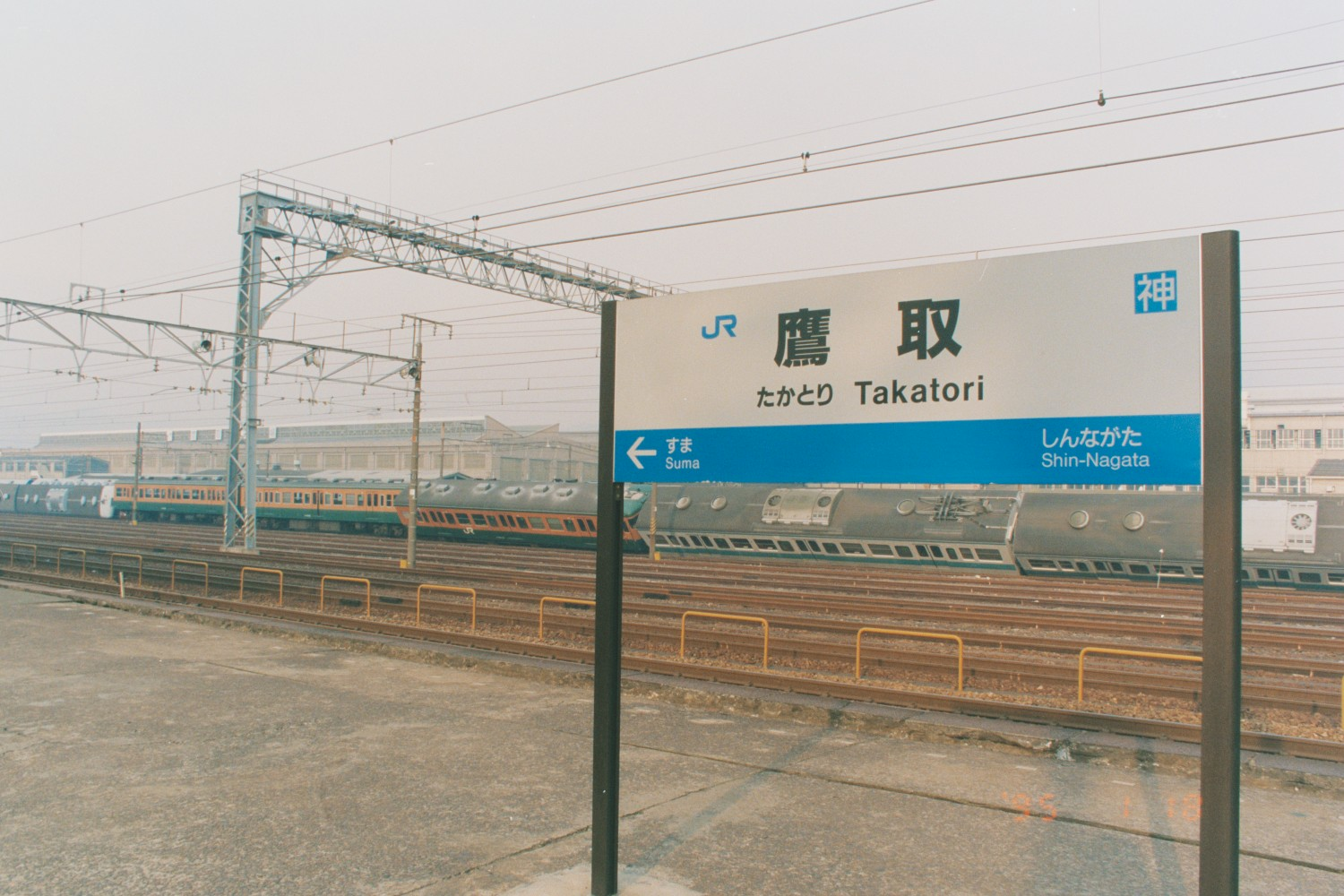
A train knocked over at Takatori Station after the Great Hanshin Earthquake in 1995

== History ==
Station numbering was introduced in March 2018 with Takatori being assigned station number JR-A66.
