= Paper Dome =

Coordinates: 23.9414°N 120.9271°E

- 桃米紙教堂
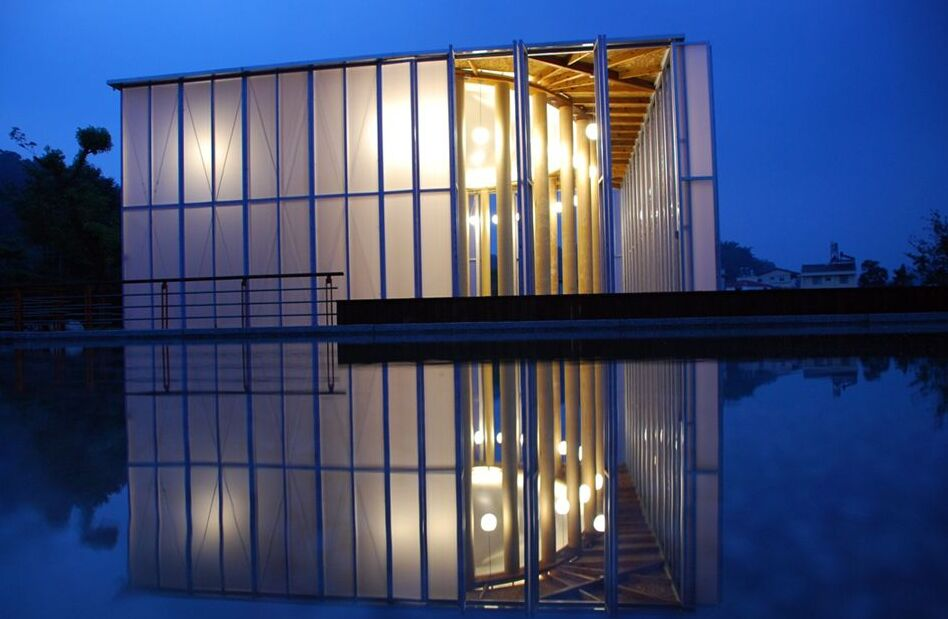
- Paper Dome
- Location: Puli, Nantou County, Taiwan

Architecture
- Architect: Shigeru Ban
- Architectural type: Church
- Completed: 2008

The Paper Dome (Chinese: 桃米紙教堂; pinyin: Táomǐ Zhǐ Jiàotáng) is a temporary church building constructed using paper tubes as structural elements. It was designed on a pro-bono basis by Shigeru Ban, a Japanese architect who is known for his paper tube structures and buildings. This temporary structure was built on September 17, 1995 to serve as a temporary church for Takatori Catholic Church after the Great Hanshin earthquake. The venue was not only limited for use to religious worship, but also used for communal gatherings. When the church community planned to build a permanent building, the structure was donated to Taomi Village in Puli Township, Nantou County, Taiwan, which had suffered the 921 earthquake in 1999. The deconstructed structure was shipped in 2006 to Taiwan, reconstructed there and is now a tourist attraction.

== History ==
In January, 1995 Japan suffered from the Great Hanshin earthquake. 60% of all buildings were destroyed in Kobe, the epicenter of the disaster, including the Takatori Catholic church. However, a statue of Jesus remained unharmed. People in the area understood this fact as a miracle and decided to rebuild the church as soon as possible. Japanese architect Shigeru Ban was invited to build a temporary church.

Shigeru Ban is known for using paper material in his projects. Ban is also known for his humanistic beliefs and social orientation. He built shelters for refugees in Africa and South America. There he noticed that cheap plastic shelters were too cold for people and it was more appropriate to use paper shelters.

Ban created the ellipse-shape construction from 58 cardboard tubes. 160 volunteers helped build the structure, taking five weeks to construct. The temporary church was nicknamed "Paper Dome". Paper Dome became not only the new religious center, but also played the role as a community meeting place.

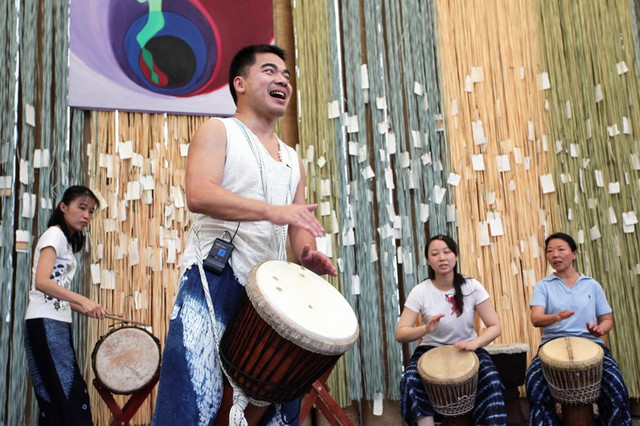
Taiwanese Minority Dance

After 10 years, it became apparent that the building was too small and that it had to be replaced by a new permanent church. Paper Dome was originally to be destroyed. However, the president of the New Homeland Foundation visited Kobe and suggested donating the Paper Dome to the Taomi community as a symbol of friendship between Japan and Taiwan.

On 29 May 2005, the last service was held in the Paper Dome in Kobe and the building was then sent to Taiwan. After three years of formalities, Taomi became the new home for Paper Dome. On 25 May 2008, over 1000 people participated in the reconstruction of the church.

The Paper Dome was opened for visitors on the next day, nine years after the 921 earthquake. On 21 September 2008, delegates of Christianity and Daoism blessed the land.

== Structure ==
The structure is essentially a hollow paper tube constructed by 58 tubes, each with a diameter of 33 cm with a thickness of about 1.5 cm. The church is 5 meters (16.4 ft) tall. The Dome was constructed as a temporary structure, facilitating its dismantlement. Each tube is coated in a water-resistant coating created in Puli Township. Each tube weighs about 60 kg (132.2 lbs), but they are able to support up to 1500 kg (3306.9 lbs) each. Each taller pillar is able to support up to 6900 kg (15,211.9 lbs).

== Appearances on TV ==
The building is features briefly in the Hong Kong television series Young Charioteers, which was filmed in Taiwan.
