= Chang Mei-yao =

Taiwanese actress

- 張富枝
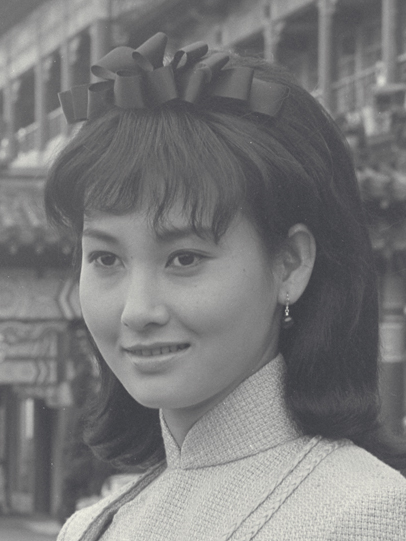
- Chang in 1967
- Pronunciation: Zhāng Fùzhī
- Born: Chang Fu-chi; 1 January 1941
- Died: 1 April 2012 (aged 71); Puli, Nantou County, Taiwan
- Occupation: Actress
- Spouse: Ko Chun-hsiung
- Awards: Golden Horse Awards; Golden Bell Awards

Chang Fu-chi (Chinese: 張富枝; pinyin: Zhāng Fùzhī; 1 January 1941 – 1 April 2012), known by the stage name Chang Mei-yao (Chinese: 張美瑤; pinyin: Zhāng Měiyáo), was a Taiwanese actress.

Chang Fu-chi was born in 1941 in what later became Puli, Nantou County to a family of Taiwanese aboriginal descent. She assumed the stage name Chang Mei-yao and began her acting career in 1957 after graduating from junior high school. She signed with Lin Tuan-chiu's Yufeng Pictures, which produced Taiwanese Hokkien-language films, shortly before the studio closed its doors in 1959. After a few years as a radio broadcaster, Chang joined Peter Long and the Taiwan Film Studio. She also appeared in films produced by companies based in Japan and Hong Kong. Chang married Ko Chun-hsiung in 1970 and subsequently retired from acting. She was active again from 2002 to 2009, primarily as a television actress. During the 2000s, she was repeatedly nominated as a Golden Bell Award finalist, but never won.

Chang divorced Ko in 2004. In 2008, she received a specially designated Golden Horse Award. She died on 1 April 2012 at the age of 71, and later that year, was posthumously awarded a Golden Bell special award.
