= Ker Chien-ming =

Taiwanese politician and former dentist (born 1951)

Ker Chien-ming MLY
- 柯建銘
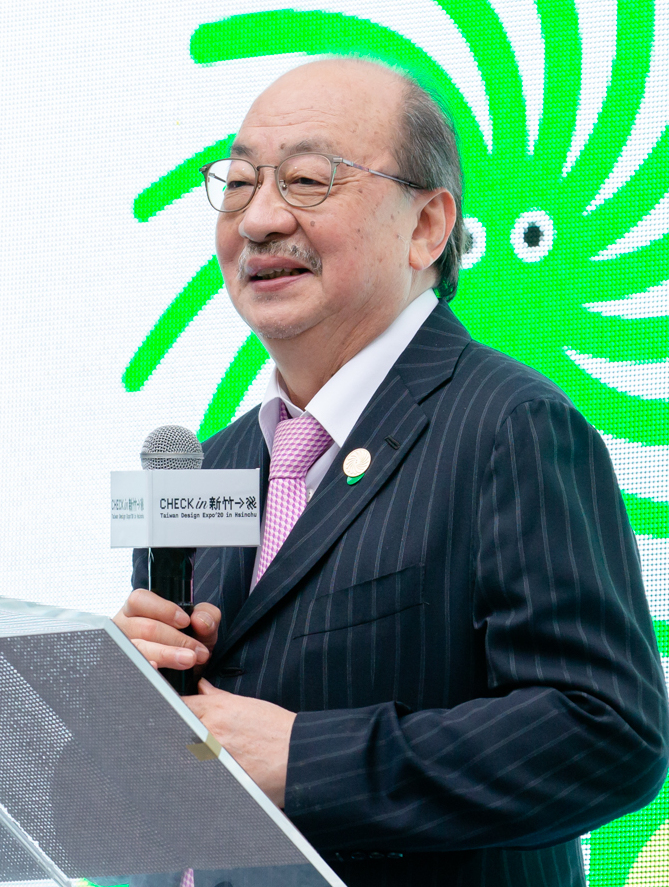
- Ker in 2020

Member of the Legislative Yuan
- Incumbent
- Assumed office 1 February 2020
- Constituency: Proportional Representation №8
- In office 1 February 2016 – 1 February 2020
- Preceded by: Lu Hsueh-chang
- Succeeded by: Cheng Cheng-chien
- Constituency: Hsinchu City
- In office 1 February 2008 – 1 February 2016
- Constituency: Proportional Representation №2
- In office 1 February 1993 – 1 February 2008
- Preceded by: Hsu Wu-sheng
- Succeeded by: Lu Hsueh-chang
- Constituency: Hsinchu's 1st district
- Preceded by: Lai Shyh-bao
- Succeeded by: Fu Kun-chi

Acting Chairman of the Democratic Progressive Party
- In office 11 March 2011 – 27 April 2011
- Preceded by: Tsai Ing-wen
- Succeeded by: Tsai Ing-wen
- In office 11 December 2004 – 15 January 2005
- Preceded by: Chen Shui-bian
- Succeeded by: Su Tseng-chang

Personal details
- Born: 8 September 1951 (age 75) Hsinchu, Taiwan
- Party: Democratic Progressive Party
- Education: Chung Shan Medical University (MB); Tamkang University (MS)

Chinese name
- Traditional Chinese: 柯建銘
- Simplified Chinese: 柯建铭
Transcriptions
Standard Mandarin
- Hanyu Pinyin: Kē Jiànmíng
- Wade–Giles: Kō Chièn-míng
Southern Min
- Hokkien POJ: Kho Kiàn-bêng

Ker Chien-ming (Chinese: 柯建銘; pinyin: Kē Jiànmíng; Wade–Giles: Ke^{1} Chien^{4}-ming^{2}; born 8 September 1951) is a Taiwanese politician and former dentist who serves as minority leader in the Legislative Yuan. From 2016 to February 2024, he was the majority leader, after the Democratic Progressive Party won a majority of seats in the Legislative Yuan for the first time.

== Early life and education ==
Ker was born on 8 September 1951 in Hsinchu, Taiwan. His father, Ker Tzu-yu (柯子餘), was a businessman who ran a traditional incense shop, called Ko Fang Mei (柯芳美香行), in Hsinchu. His mother, Ker Chen Tsai-e (柯陳彩娥), died in November 2017 at the age of 98. During the February 28 incident in 1947, Tzu-yu spent time as a fugitive escaping law enforcement. Ker later recalled that, after the incident, his father became a critic of the Kuomintang (KMT) and frequently criticized the party and Chiang Kai-shek at home.

As a child, Ker contracted and recovered from tuberculosis in elementary school; the illness inspired him to attend medical school. He later graduated from National Hsinchu Senior High School. While attending high school, Ker joined the KMT at the request of a military instructor. After high school, he graduated from Chung Shan Medical University with a degree in dentistry. During his time in college, he developed an interest in banned literature, including the magazine Free China. He also attended public speeches organized by activists associated with the Tangwai movement. Also while in college, Ker was seriously injured in a traffic accident that caused a concussion and fractures to the left side of his face. He has attributed difficulties with his speech to injuries sustained in the accident.

After completing his dental studies, Ker began graduate studies in the United States at the University of Southern California, but ultimately did not complete a degree. He instead took the examinations necessary to obtain a dental license in the U.S. He then returned to Hsinchu, where he began practicing dentistry in 1975. He later earned a master's degree in management science from Tamkang University.

== Political career ==
Ker is a founding member of the Democratic Progressive Party and was first elected to the Legislative Yuan in 1992. He represented Hsinchu district from 1993 to 2008, and again starting in 2016. From 2008 to 2016 and again from 2020, Ker was elected via proportional representation.

On 17 August 2022, in the aftermath of then Speaker of the United States House of Representatives Nancy Pelosi's visit to Taiwan on 2–3 August, China blacklisted seven Taiwanese officials including Ker as "diehard "Taiwan independence" separatists" due to their support for Taiwan independence. The blacklist bans them from entering mainland China and the Special Administrative Regions of Hong Kong and Macau, and restricts them from working with Chinese officials. Chinese state-run tabloid Global Times labelled Ker and the six officials as "diehard secessionists".

On 11 July 2025, during a dispute in the Legislative Yuan, Ker invoked Article 100 of the Criminal Code, stating: "Article 100 of the Criminal Code still exists." (Article 100 of the Criminal Code stipulates penalties for those "intending to undermine the state," with offenders subject to up to five years' imprisonment, which has led critics to regard it as a form of thought crime.) In response, KMT legislator Wu Tsung-hsien also remarked that the DPP had previously advocated abolishing Article 100, and its current attempt to revive it constituted "a betrayal of Taiwanese democracy." Ker countered that Article 100 had not been abolished but was revised and remained in effect. He emphasized that it serves to protect national security and that acts of violence or coercion within the legislature should be prosecuted according to the law. The Kuomintang heavily publicized Ker's remarks, with KMT legislator Ling Tao claiming that Lai Ching-te and Ker would "imitate Yoon Suk-yeol next week by declaring martial law."

Party political offices
Preceded by Chen Shui-bian	Chairperson of the Democratic Progressive Party; Acting; 2004–2005	Succeeded by Su Tseng-chang
Preceded by Tsai Ing-wen	Chairperson of the Democratic Progressive Party; Acting; 11 March 2011 – 27 April 2011	Succeeded by Tsai Ing-wen
