= Puli, Nantou =

Urban township in Nantou County, Taiwan

Coordinates: 23°58′00″N 120°58′00″E

Puli Township 埔里鎮 Hori
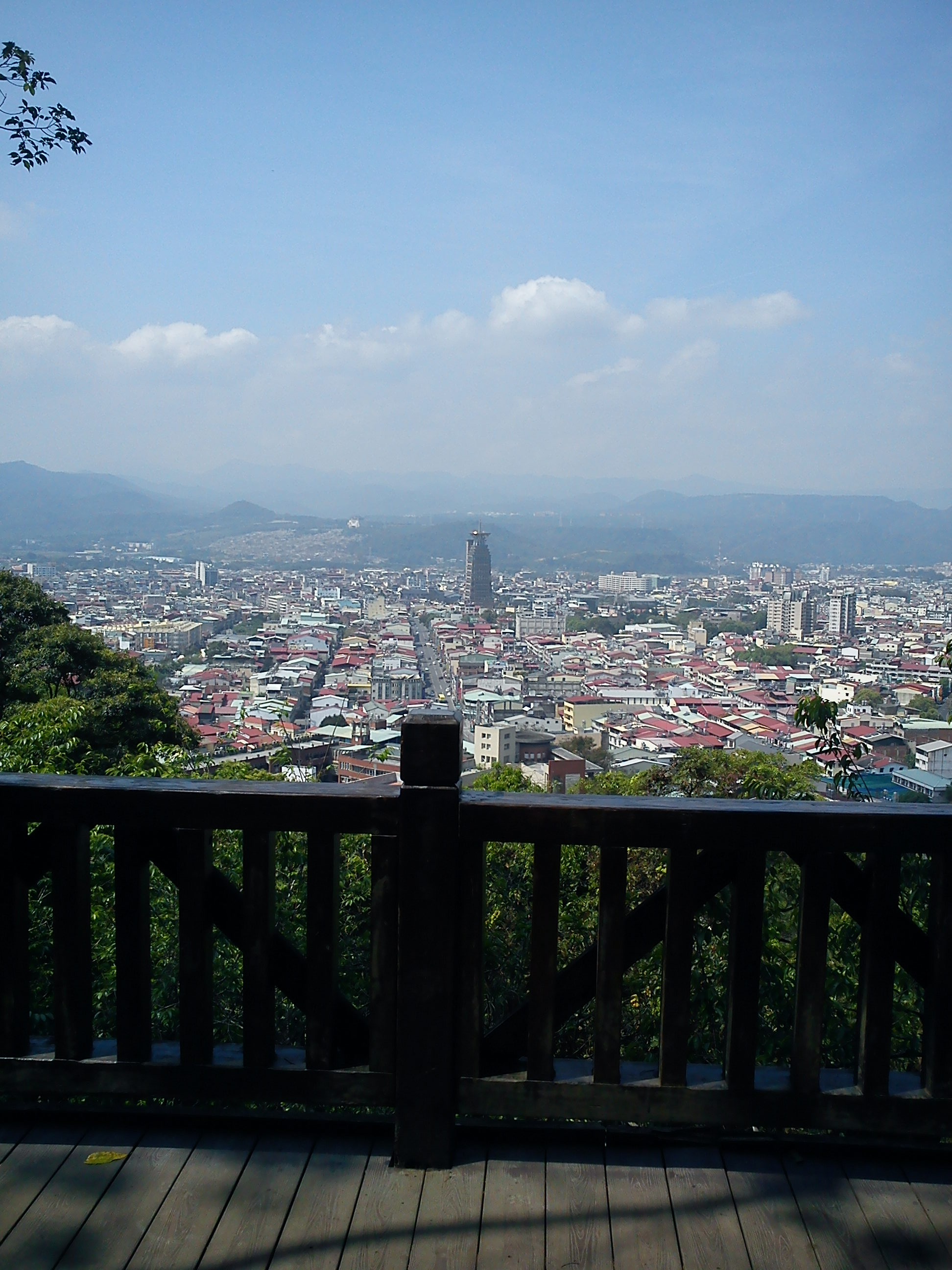
- View of downtown Puli

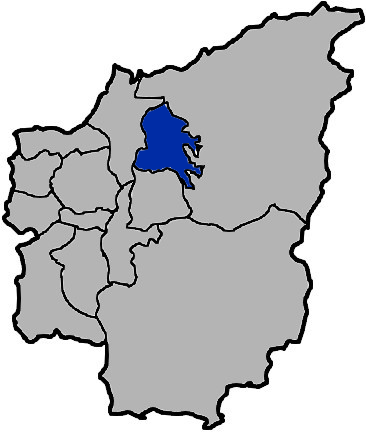
- Location of Puli in Nantou County
- Country: Taiwan
- County: Nantou

Government
  - Magistrate: Zhou Yixiong

Area
  - Total: 162.22 km^{2} (62.63 sq mi)
- Elevation: 445 m (1,460 ft)

Population (February 2023)
  - Total: 77,299
- Website: http://www.puli.gov.tw

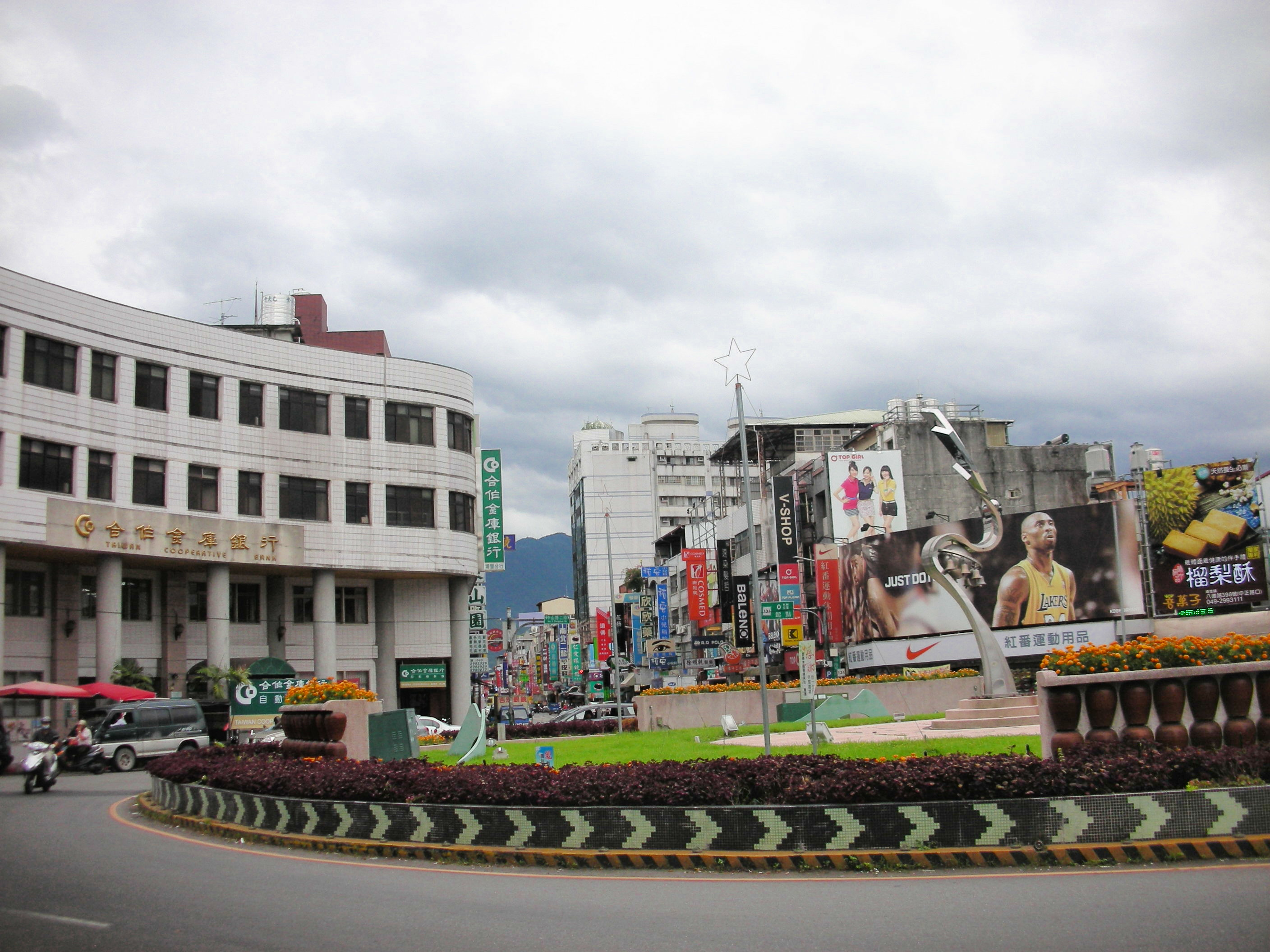
Downtown Puli

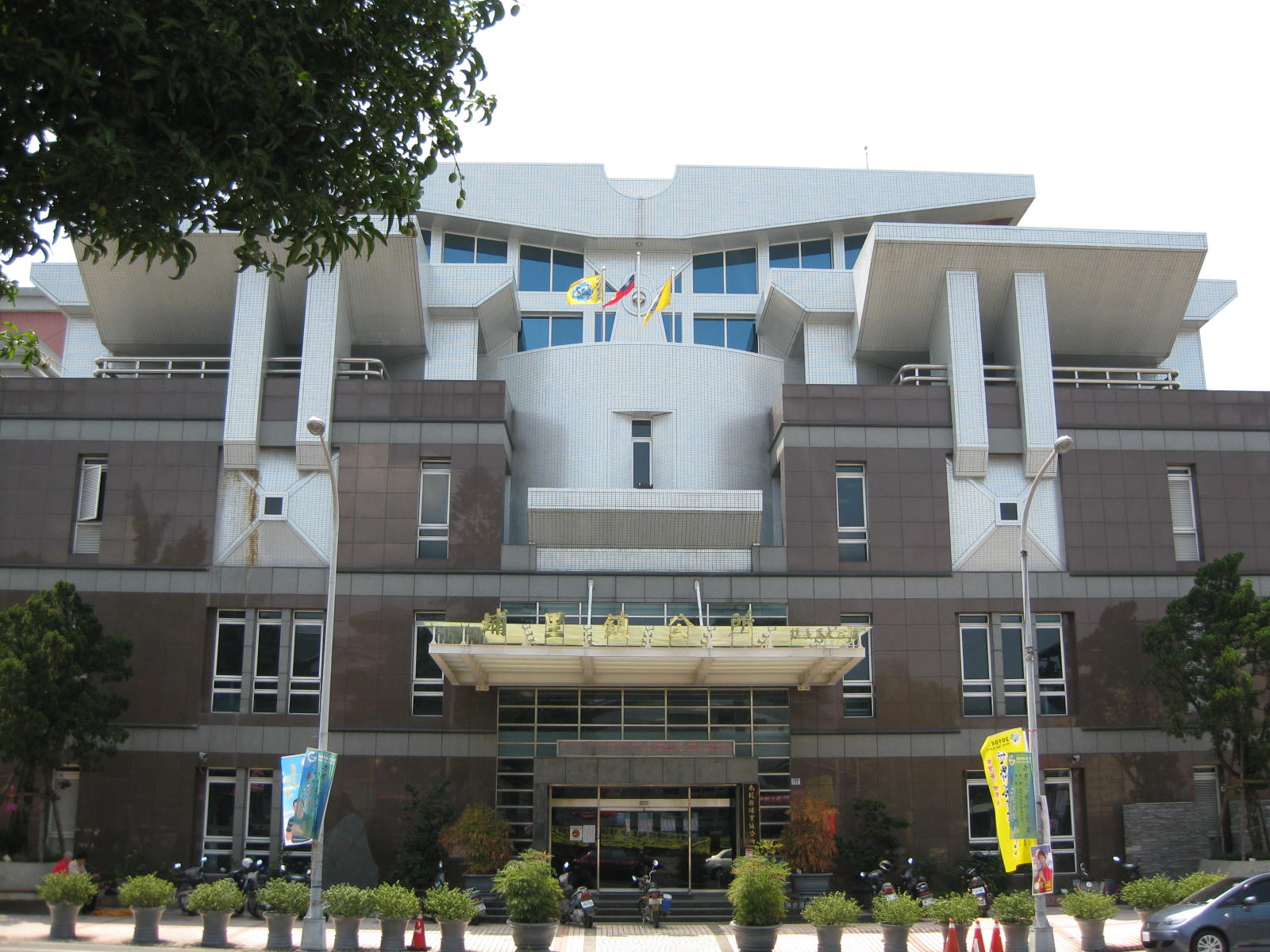
Puli Township Office

Puli Township (Chinese: 埔里鎮; pinyin: Pǔlǐ zhèn; Wade–Giles: P'u^{3}-li^{3} chen^{4}; Pe̍h-ōe-jī: Po͘-lí-tìn) is an urban township in Nantou County, Taiwan. The township is located within the Puli Basin in central Taiwan.

== Name ==
In the 19th century the city was known as Posia (Chinese: 埔社; Pe̍h-ōe-jī: Po͘-siā) or Po-li-sia (埔裏社). The Atayal name of the settlement was Sabaha Bakalas, meaning "house of stars". From 1920, during the Japanese era, the town was administered as Hori Town (埔里街), Nōkō District (能高郡), Taichū Prefecture.

== History ==
=== Spread of Christianity ===
In 1870, a native of Po-li-sia named Khai-san received treatment for a medical issue in a missionary hospital in Taiwan-fu (present-day Tainan) and learned about Christianity. When he returned home, he spread information about Christianity to the people of the area. In July 1871, two native preachers were sent to the area after reports concerning the spread of Christianity in Po-li-sia were heard of in Taiwan-fu. They reported back that "a movement, favourable to Christianity, had really taken place" in the area. Members of the Canada Presbyterian Mission visited the area in March 1872. In late 1872, William Campbell was part of an armed party that traversed the jungle, mountains and streams between Toa-sia and Po-li-sia to participate in examining candidates for baptism who lived in Po-li-sia.

=== Chi Chi earthquake ===
In 1999, this town was damaged by the 921 earthquake. The damage was especially severe in Taomi Village, a small rural village located within Puli Township. 10 years later, the village has since re-invented itself to be the pride of Taiwan's eco-tourism industry. Especially after the opening of the Paper Dome, now a major attraction in Puli Township, Taomi Village was transformed from a sleepy agricultural village to one that is busting with activities related to community redevelopment and eco-tourism. Since then, Taomi Village has seen vibrancy unprecedented since its glory days in the 1970s as an agricultural hub.

== Administrative divisions ==
Tungmen, Pacheng, Pipa, Shuitou, Qilin, Zhuge, Xinan, Ximen, Nanmen, Beimen, Beian, Beimei, Taian, Danan, Wugong, Tongsheng, Qingxin, Xunhua, Dacheng, Lancheng, Taomi, Chenggong, Nancun, Ailan, Tieshan, Fangli, Xiangshan, Yixin, Gecheng, Guangcheng, Shigang, Fuxing and Niumian Village.

== Economy ==
There is a TTL brewery in the township. One of the main economic activities in Puli is tourism. It is located in the mountainous center of Taiwan, and many tourist destination spots, such as Sun Moon Lake are nearby.

== Education ==
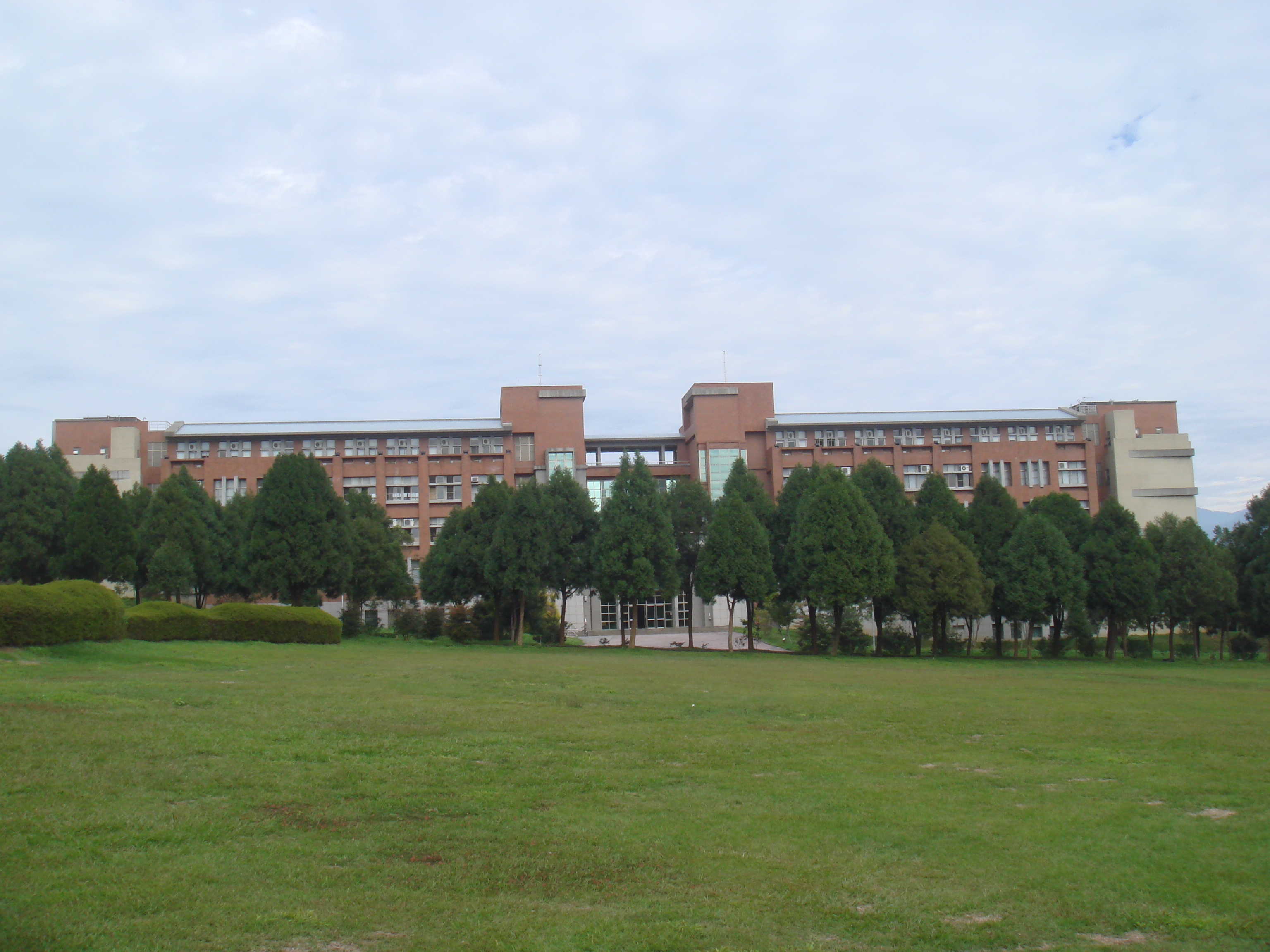
National Chi Nan University

=== University ===
- National Chi Nan University

=== High school ===
- National Puli Industrial Vocational Senior High School
- The Affiliated Senior High School of National Chi-Nan University

== Tourist attractions ==
- Chung Tai Chan Monastery
- Geographic center of Taiwan
- Hung Gee Bees Farm
- Knock on Wood Working
- Muh Sheng Museum of Entomology
- Liyutan

== Transportation ==
Puli is at one end of National Highway 6 which provides a connection with west Taiwan towards Taichung and Nantou City. At the eastern end of the Highway the Puli exit connects to the Hehuanshan mountain pass, at its highest point 3275 meters above sea level, before the road continues to Hualien on the east coast. By this combination of roads, Puli is located along the only east-west coast to coast route crossing the central portion of the island.

== Notable natives ==
- Chang Mei-yao, former actress
- Lin Cho-shui, writer, newspaper editor and politician
- Ma Wen-chun, member of Legislative Yuan
- Tsai Huang-liang, member of Legislative Yuan (1996-2016)

== Other notable people ==
- Hsieh Ho-hsien, famous singer

== Climate ==
Climate data for Puli, elevation 440 m (1,440 ft), (2016–2023 normals, extremes 2016–present)
Month	Jan	Feb	Mar	Apr	May	Jun	Jul	Aug	Sep	Oct	Nov	Dec	Year
Record high °C (°F)	29.8 (85.6)	31.3 (88.3)	32.6 (90.7)	33.0 (91.4)	35.1 (95.2)	34.7 (94.5)	37.8 (100.0)	36.8 (98.2)	34.1 (93.4)	36.7 (98.1)	34.6 (94.3)	30.9 (87.6)	37.8 (100.0)
Mean daily maximum °C (°F)	22.9 (73.2)	23.4 (74.1)	25.5 (77.9)	27.8 (82.0)	30.1 (86.2)	31.2 (88.2)	32.5 (90.5)	31.6 (88.9)	31.6 (88.9)	29.8 (85.6)	27.7 (81.9)	24.3 (75.7)	28.2 (82.8)
Daily mean °C (°F)	16.9 (62.4)	17.5 (63.5)	19.9 (67.8)	22.4 (72.3)	24.9 (76.8)	25.7 (78.3)	26.6 (79.9)	26.4 (79.5)	26.2 (79.2)	24.6 (76.3)	22.0 (71.6)	18.4 (65.1)	22.6 (72.7)
Mean daily minimum °C (°F)	12.8 (55.0)	13.1 (55.6)	15.6 (60.1)	18.5 (65.3)	21.3 (70.3)	22.3 (72.1)	22.8 (73.0)	22.9 (73.2)	22.5 (72.5)	20.8 (69.4)	18.0 (64.4)	14.4 (57.9)	18.8 (65.7)
Record low °C (°F)	3.3 (37.9)	5.0 (41.0)	7.4 (45.3)	9.2 (48.6)	16.4 (61.5)	19.4 (66.9)	20.1 (68.2)	20.5 (68.9)	18.1 (64.6)	13.2 (55.8)	11.0 (51.8)	3.7 (38.7)	3.3 (37.9)
Average precipitation mm (inches)	63.3 (2.49)	44.8 (1.76)	99.8 (3.93)	133.4 (5.25)	348.8 (13.73)	495.3 (19.50)	328.4 (12.93)	385.2 (15.17)	151.1 (5.95)	46.3 (1.82)	27.3 (1.07)	36.1 (1.42)	2,157.7 (84.95)
Average precipitation days	7.3	7.0	8.8	10.0	13.6	20.0	18.9	20.7	11.1	5.0	5.2	5.9	133.5
Average relative humidity (%)	79.9	78.0	78.3	79.2	82.0	84.9	82.1	83.9	80.5	78.6	80.2	80.7	80.7
Source 1: Central Weather Administration
Source 2: Atmospheric Science Research and Application Databank (precipitation days and humidity 2016–2024)
