= Geographic center of Taiwan =

Geographical center in Puli, Nantou County, Taiwan

- 臺灣地理中心
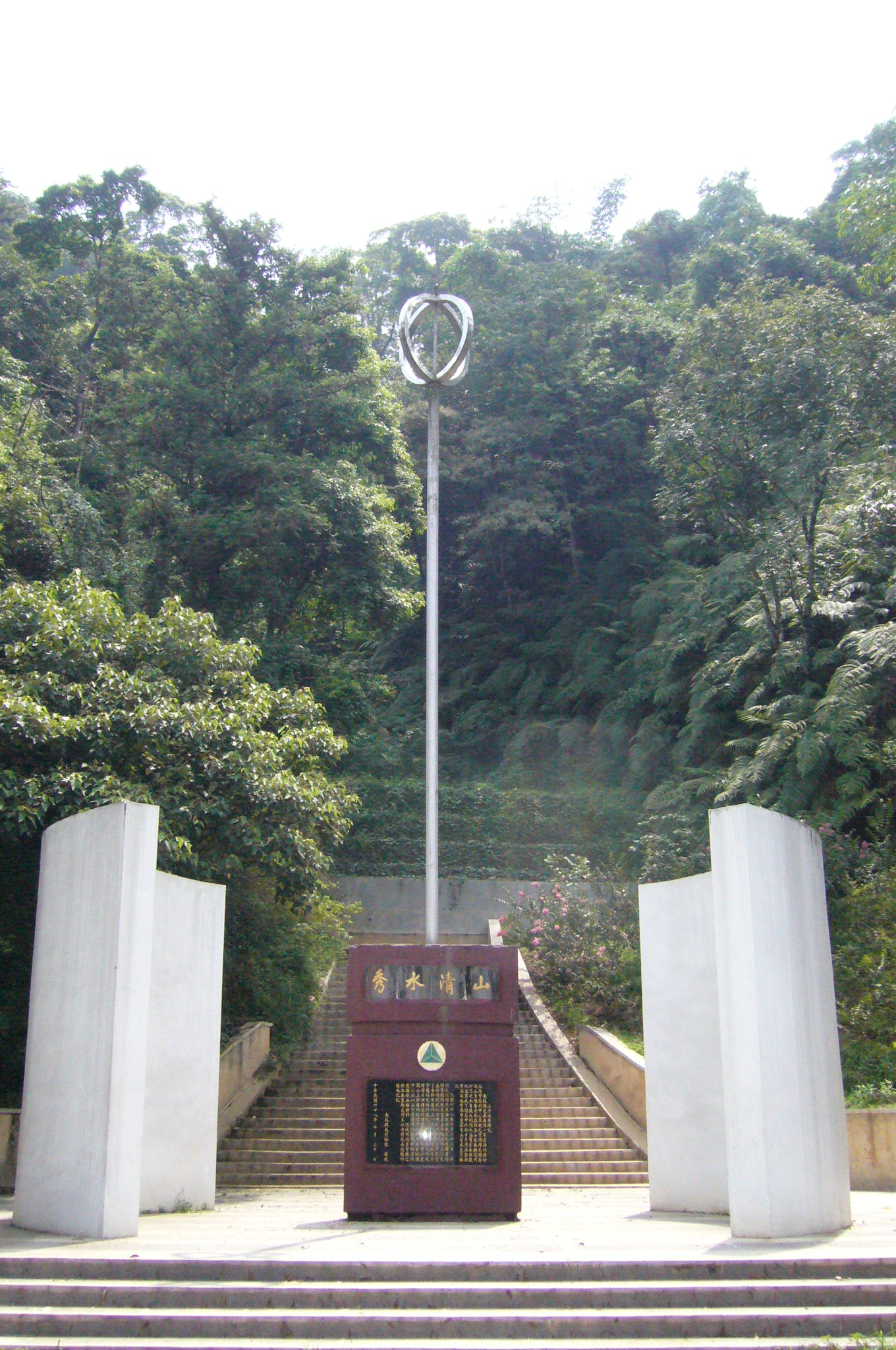
- The first Geographic Center of Taiwan Monument
- Interactive map of Geographic center of Taiwan
- Location: Mount Hutou, Puli, Nantou County, Taiwan
- Coordinates: 23°58′25.9″N 120°58′55.2″E
- Type: geographical center

Geographic center of Taiwan
- Traditional Chinese: 臺灣地理中心
Transcriptions
Standard Mandarin
- Hanyu Pinyin: Táiwān Dìlǐ Zhōngxīn
- Wade–Giles: T’ai-wan Ti-li Chung-hsin

Geographic center of Taiwan is the center point of Taiwan Island. It is located at Mount Hutou (t 虎頭山, s 虎头山, Hutoushan, "Tiger Head Mountain") in the township of Puli in Nantou County, Taiwan.

== History ==
The first Geographic Center of Taiwan monument was constructed at the base of Mount Hutou in the 1970s. Following improved surveying, another monument was built later on, on the peak of the mountain. The peak monument was built on the former site of the Yoshitaka Shrine erected by the Japanese during their occupation of Taiwan.

== Architecture ==
The monument is located on a place which is accessible via 400 stairs leading to it. The base monument features an inscription by former President Chiang Ching-kuo, written as Shan Qing Shui Xiu. There are concentric steel rings on top of the monument pole, forming the basis of Puli Township logo. The peak monument was built in an aboriginal style, using columns with flare tops.

== Transportation ==
The monument is accessible by bus from Taichung Station of Taiwan Railway.

== See also ==
- Geography of Taiwan
- Cape Fugui, the northernmost point on Taiwan
- Eluanbi, the southernmost point on Taiwan
