= Hsinchu City Council =

Elected city council in Taiwan

Coordinates: 24°48′26.3″N 120°58′5.5″E

Hsinchu City Council 新竹市議會

Type
- Type: city council

Leadership
- Speaker: Hsu Siou-ruei since 2018
- Deputy Speaker: Yu Bang-yan since 2018

Structure
- Seats: 34
- Political groups: KMT (14); DPP (8); NPP (3); Taiwan People's (2); Independent (7)

Elections
- Voting system: single non-transferable vote
- Last election: 2022

Meeting place
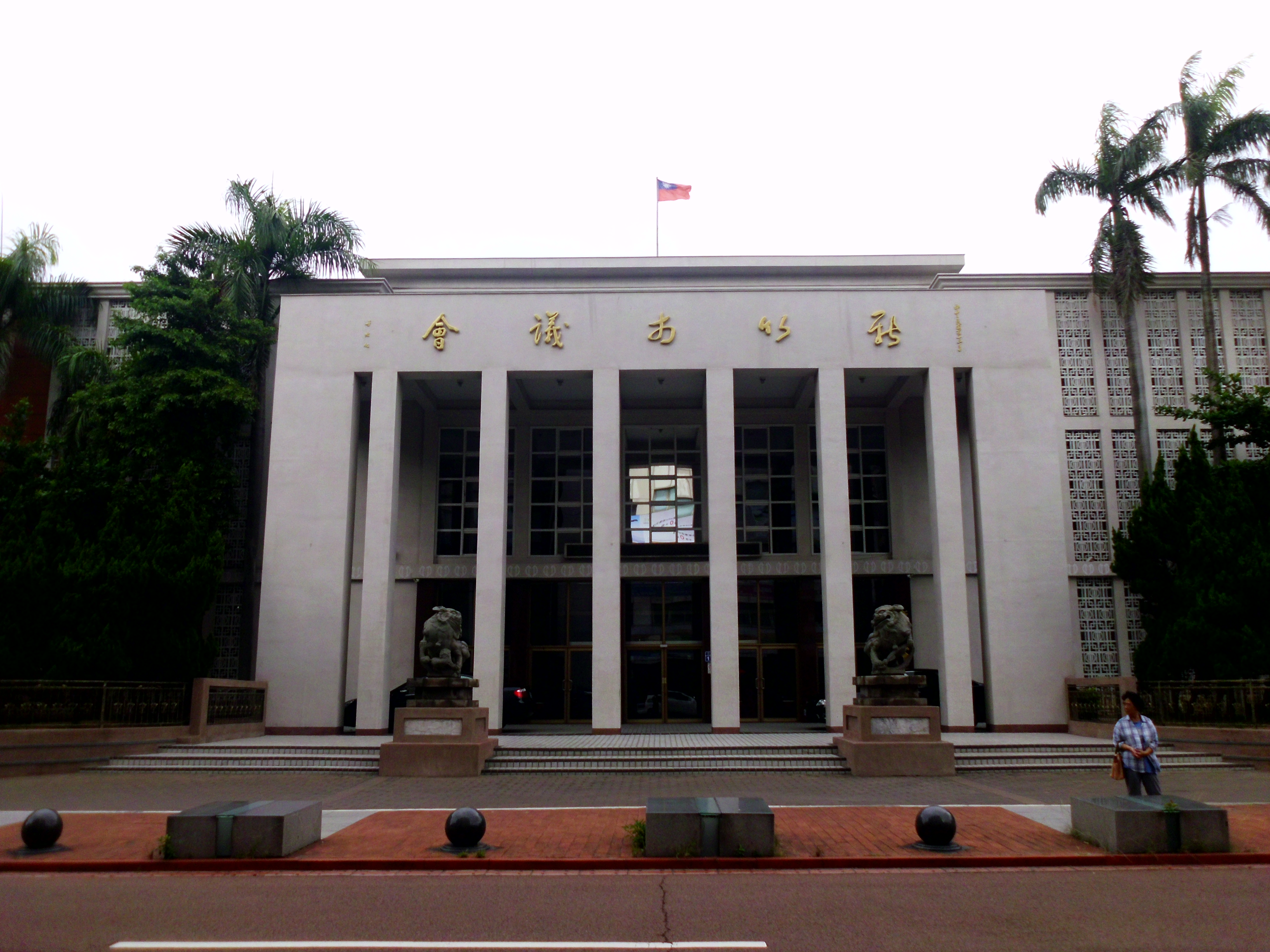
- The Building of Hsinchu City Council; North District, Hsinchu City, Taiwan

Website
- Official website

The Hsinchu City Council (traditional Chinese: 新竹市議會; simplified Chinese: 新竹市议会; pinyin: Xīnzhú Shì Yìhuì) is the elected city council of Hsinchu City, Republic of China. The council composes of 34 councilors lastly elected through the 2018 Republic of China local election on 26 November 2022.

== History ==
The city council was established on 1 July 1982 with 24 sets for its first term.

== Organization ==
- Disciplinary Committee
- Procedural Committee
- The First Review Committee
- The Second Review Committee
- The Third Review Committee
- The Fourth Review Committee
- Secretary
- Council Affairs Section
- General Affairs Section
- Legal Affairs Section
- Accounting Office
- Personnel Office

== Speakers ==
- Hsieh Wen-chin (2010-2018)
- Hsu Siou-ruei (2018-)

== Transportation ==
The council is accessible within walking distance North West from Hsinchu Station of Taiwan Railway.

== See also ==
- Hsinchu City Government
