= Cardboard Cathedral =

- Transitional Cathedral
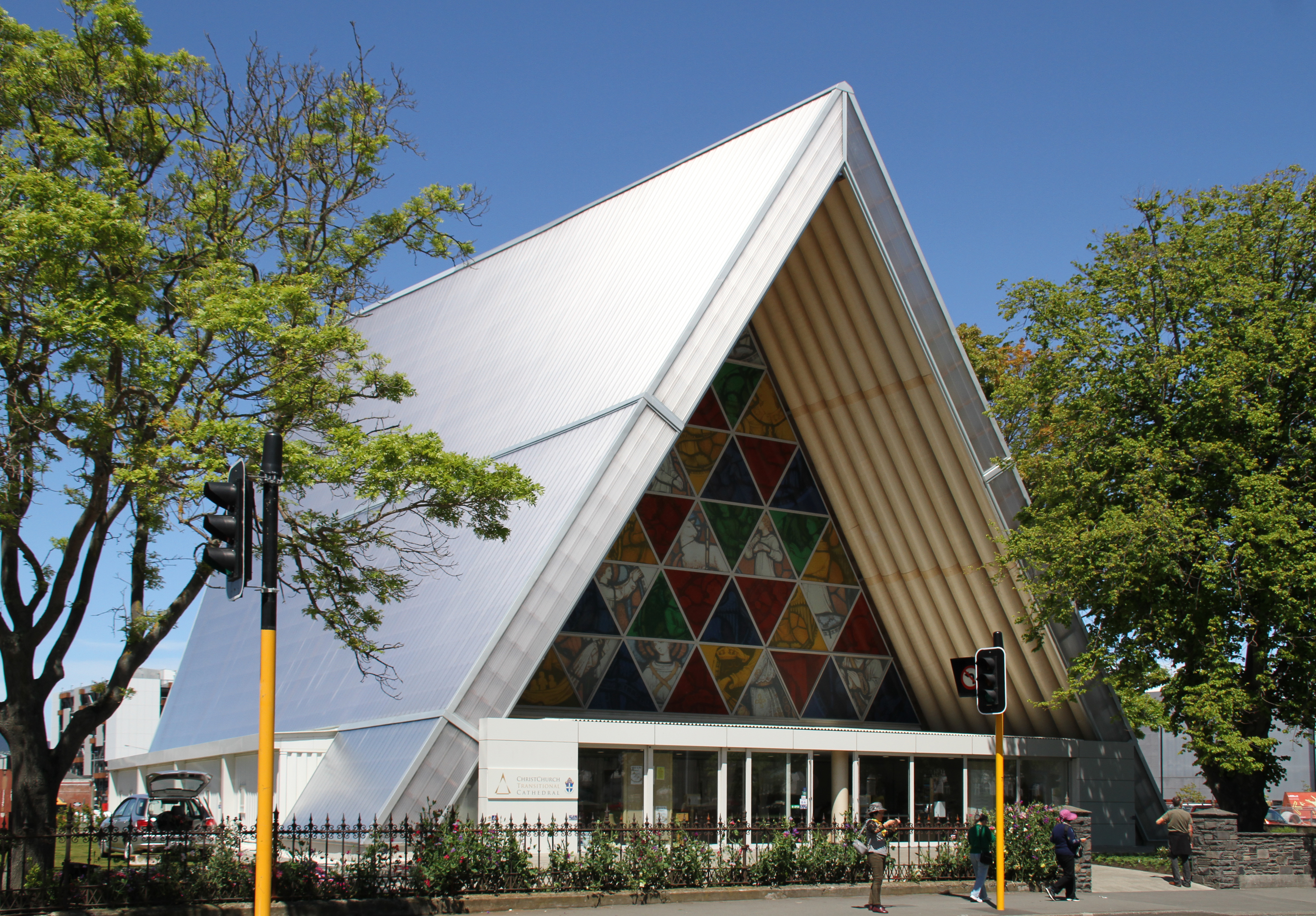
- The Cardboard Cathedral in 2016
- Cardboard Cathedral
- 43°31′56.1″S 172°38′34.3″E
- Location: Christchurch Central City
- Country: New Zealand
- Denomination: Anglican
- Website: Official website

History
- Dedicated: 15 August 2013

Architecture
- Architect: Shigeru Ban
- Construction cost: NZ$5m

Specifications
- Materials: cardboard tubes, timber, steel

Administration
- Diocese: Anglican Diocese of Christchurch

Clergy
- Bishop: Peter Carrell

The Cardboard Cathedral, formally called the Transitional Cathedral, in Christchurch, New Zealand, is the transitional pro-cathedral of the Anglican Diocese of Christchurch, replacing ChristChurch Cathedral, which was significantly damaged in the 2011 Christchurch earthquake. It is located on the site of the former St John the Baptist Church on the corner of Hereford and Madras Streets in Latimer Square, several blocks from the permanent location of ChristChurch Cathedral.

The Cardboard Cathedral was designed by the Japanese architect Shigeru Ban in association with Warren and Mahoney and opened in August 2013. The church gets its nickname from the use of over 90 large cardboard tubes for its walls and roof.

== Location ==
The building is on a section allocated to the Anglican Church in Christchurch's original 1850 survey opposite Latimer Square. It was originally the site of St John the Baptist Church, the first church built in permanent materials by Anglicans in Christchurch, which was demolished after the 2011 Christchurch earthquake. The St John parish gave the land, and in return can use the building and will keep it once a permanent cathedral can be used.

== History ==
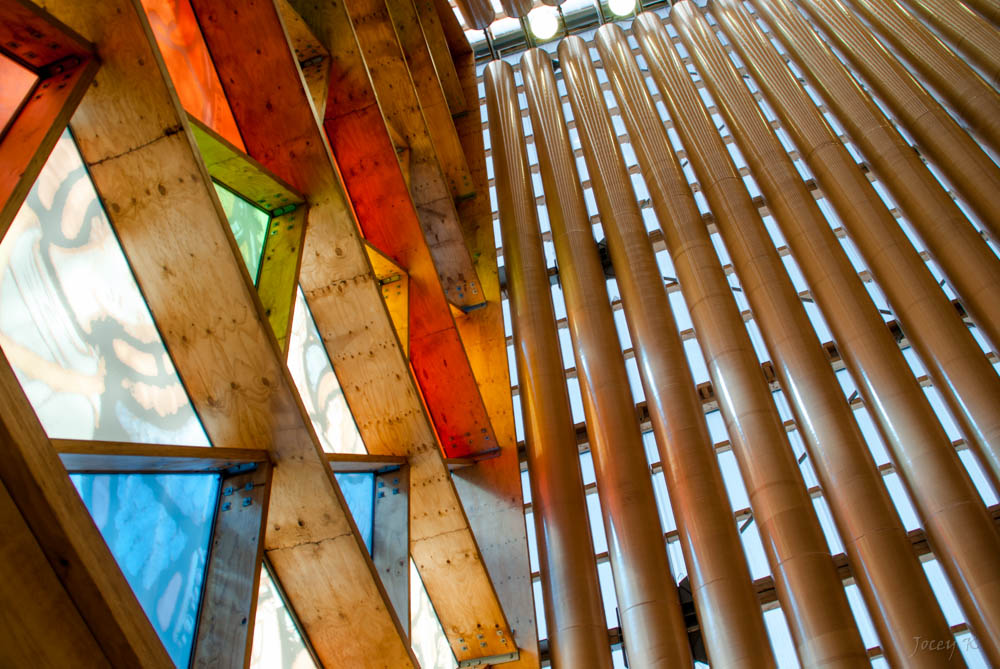
Construction details; cardboard, wood and glass

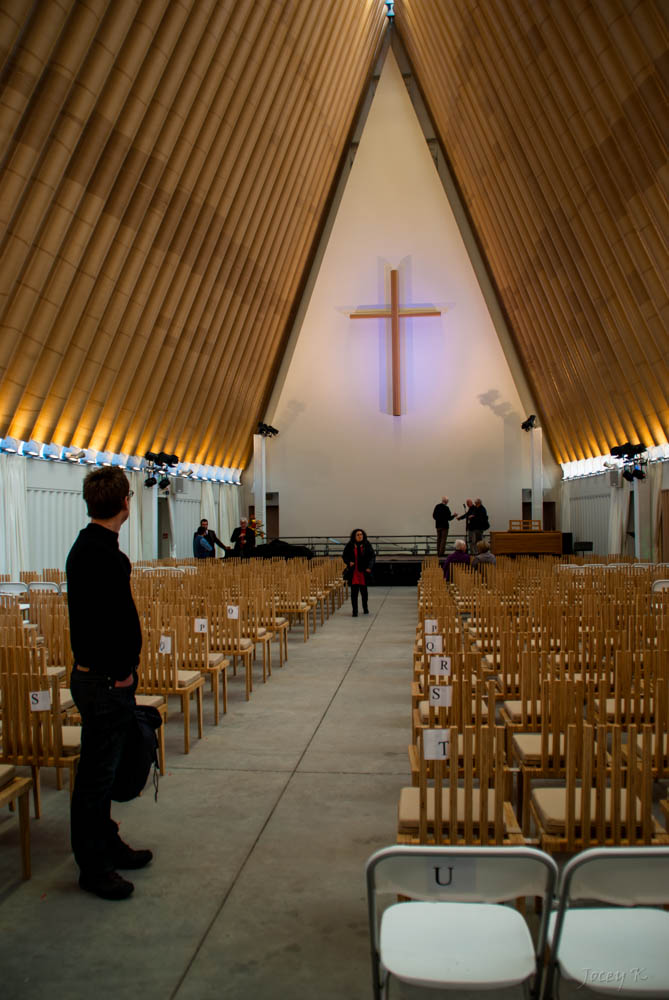
Cathedral interior

Following the earthquakes, Shigeru Ban was invited to Christchurch by Rev. Craig Dixon, the cathedral's marketing and development manager, to discuss a temporary cathedral that could also host concerts and civic events. The concept was developed during that visit. Ban, who is characterised as a "disaster architect", designed the building pro bono, in collaboration with Christchurch architecture firm Warren and Mahoney.

Initially it was hoped to have the cathedral open in February 2012 for the first earthquake anniversary. A-frame in style, rising 24 metres (79 ft), it incorporated 86 cardboard tubes of 500 kilograms (1,100 lb) each atop 6 metres (20 ft) long containers. However, it was not until April 2012 that the site was blessed, and construction began on 24 July 2012. Once the decision had been made that the building would remain for St John parish, it was constructed as a permanent structure.

At the same time as the site blessing, controversy raged about the Anglican Diocese having applied to Christchurch City Council for an annual maintenance grant of NZ$240,000. Such a maintenance grant had for many years been given for ChristChurch Cathedral, but with the Diocese determined to demolish it there was widespread opposition to an ongoing grant, and city councillors declined the request.

The Great Christchurch Building Trust (GCBT), co-chaired by former MPs Jim Anderton and Philip Burdon, took the Anglican Church to the High Court, to determine whether the decision to demolish ChristChurch Cathedral breached an Act of Parliament that protects church buildings, and whether an insurance payout for ChristChurch Cathedral can be used for the transitional cathedral. In November 2012, the church began fund-raising to pay for the NZ$5 million project following the judge indicating it may not be legal to build a temporary cathedral using the insurance payout, which the judge confirmed as illegal in April 2013.

Exposed cardboard that had become wet before the building was fully enclosed was removed and replaced. While construction was expected to be completed by Christmas 2012, it was pushed back several times. In February 2013, the NZ$5.3 million budget had increased to NZ$5.9 million because of cost escalations.

Following the numerous delays the church hierarchy became secretive about the opening date and The Press reported on 2 August 2013 that the date was still unknown, only for an opening ceremony to be held later that day for a small number of invited guests. The contractor handed a symbolic key made from cardboard to the bishop.

The building opened to the public on 6 August 2013 with a dedication service on 15 August. It was the first significant building opened as part of Christchurch's rebuild.

== Architecture ==
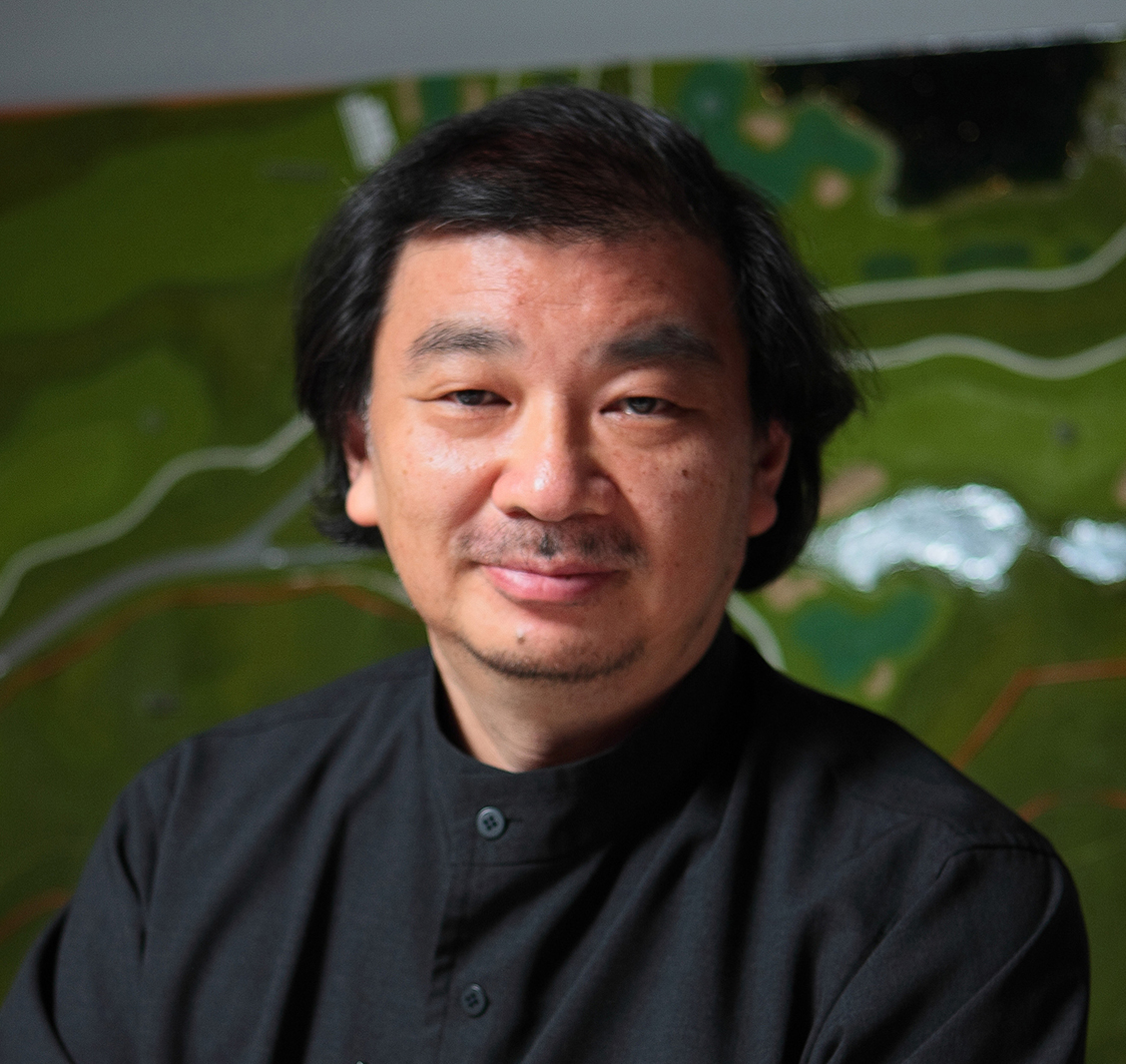
Shigeru Ban, the church's architect

The building rises 21 metres (69 ft) above the altar. Materials used include 60-centimetre (24 in)-diameter cardboard tubes, timber and steel. The roof is of polycarbon, with eight shipping containers forming the walls. The foundation is concrete slab. The architect wanted the cardboard tubes to be the structural elements, but local manufacturers could not produce tubes thick enough and importing the cardboard was rejected. The 96 tubes, reinforced with laminated wood beams, are "coated with waterproof polyurethane and flame retardants" with two-inch gaps between them so that light can filter inside. Instead of a replacement rose window, the building has triangular pieces of stained glass. The building seats around 700 people. It serves as a conference venue as well as a cathedral. It was designed to last 50 years instead of being permanent.

The Wizard of New Zealand, one of the strongest critics of the Diocese for wanting to demolish ChristChurch Cathedral and who had been a daily speaker in Cathedral Square, called the design "kitsch".

Lonely Planet named Christchurch one of the "top 10 cities to travel to in 2013" in October 2012, and the cathedral was cited as one of the reasons that makes the city an exciting place.

== Deans ==
Period	Dean	Notes
2013–2014	Lynda Patterson	Died 2014
2015–2023	Lawrence Kimberley	
2023–present	Ben Truman	
