= Lawrence Kimberley =

Lawrance Kimberley
- Born: 1962 (age 62–63)
- Education: Melbourne College of Divinity
- Spouse: Elizabeth
- Children: 1
- Church: Cardboard Cathedral
- Offices held: Curate at Church of St Michael and All Angels, Christchurch; Vicar of Heathcote-Mount Pleasant (1996–2007); Archdeacon of Pegasus (2006–2013); Vicar of St Martin, Opawa (2007–2015)
- Title: The Very Reverend

Lawrence Kimberley (born 1962) was Dean of Christchurch from 2015 to 2023.

Kimberley was also Curate at Church of St Michael and All Angels, Christchurch then Vicar of Heathcote- Mount Pleasant. He was Archdeacon of Pegasus from 2006 to 2013. He was then Vicar of St Martin, Opawa from 2007 until his appointment to the Deanery in 2015. Kimberley was previously an accountant.

== Personal life ==
Kimberley is married to Elizabeth, and together, they have one son.
