= Lynda Patterson =

- Born: 6 February 1974; County Down, Northern Ireland
- Died: 20 July 2014 (aged 40); Christchurch, New Zealand
- Church: Anglican Church of New Zealand
- Offices held: Dean of Christchurch (2013–14)
- Title: The Very Reverend

Lynda Jane Patterson (6 February 1974 – 20 July 2014) was a Northern Irish-born Anglican priest who was the 13th dean of Christchurch, New Zealand. She was the first woman to hold that position, serving from 2013 until her death in 2014.

== Early life ==
Patterson was born in County Down, Northern Ireland, to Cedric and Evelyn Patterson. Patterson was educated at Dromore Central Primary School and Banbridge Academy. She studied theology at Mansfield College, Oxford, then lectured there for twelve years. While at Mansfield she served as Junior Dean, Junior Chaplain and later as Director of Studies.

== Career ==
After visiting New Zealand in 2002, she decided to emigrate there, living initially in Auckland where she learned Māori and studied for the ministry. She was ordained by David Coles as a deacon in 2004 and a priest in 2005. The following year, she was appointed assistant dean of ChristChurch Cathedral, and director of Theology House in Merivale. She took over as acting dean following the resignation of Peter Beck in December 2011 and officially succeeded as dean on 1 November 2013, becoming the first woman to serve in that role.

During the devastating 2011 Christchurch earthquake, Patterson was inside ChristChurch Cathedral with 19 other people.

== Death ==
Patterson died of natural causes at her home in Christchurch in July 2014. Two funerals were held for her: one in Christchurch; and one at Dromore Cathedral, Dromore, County Down.
