= Half Gone =

2006 book by Jeremy Leggett

Half Gone: Oil, Gas, Hot Air and the Global Energy Crisis
- Author: Jeremy Leggett
- Language: English
- Genre: Non-fiction
- Publisher: Portobello Books
- Publication date: 2006
- Media type: Print
- Pages: 320
- ISBN: 978-1846270055

Half Gone: Oil, Gas, Hot Air and the Global Energy Crisis is a book by former oil geologist Jeremy Leggett about both oil depletion and global warming.

== Media ==
- Half Gone: Oil, Gas, Hot Air And The Global Energy Crisis, by Jeremy Leggett – A chilling reminder of the energy catastrophe that we are facing -- Julie Wheelwright -- The Independent 8 December 2005

== See also ==
- The Carbon War: Global Warming and the End of the Oil Era
