= The Carbon War =

1999 book by Jeremy Leggett

- Author: Jeremy Leggett
- Original title: The Carbon War: Global Warming and the End of the Oil Era
- Language: English
- Genre: Non fiction
- Publisher: Penguin
- Publication date: 1999
- Media type: Print
- ISBN: 978-0415931021

The Carbon War: Global Warming and the End of the Oil Era is a 1999 book by former oil geologist Jeremy Leggett about global warming.

== Media ==
- The Carbon War: Global Warming and the End of the Oil Era—reviewed by Elizabeth Vandermark—The American Institute of Architects

== See also ==
- Half Gone: Oil, Gas, Hot Air and the Global Energy Crisis
- Beyond Oil
