= Anglican Diocese of Christchurch =

Diocese of Christchurch
- Arms of the Diocese of Christchurch
- Incumbent: Peter Carrell
- Style: The Most Reverend

Location
- Country: New Zealand
- Territory: South Island
- Ecclesiastical province: Aotearoa, New Zealand and Polynesia
- Headquarters: Christchurch
- Coordinates: 43°31′55″S 172°38′18″E

Information
- First holder: Henry Harper
- Formation: 1856
- Denomination: Anglican
- Cathedral: Cardboard Cathedral

Current leadership
- Parent church: Anglican Communion
- Major Archbishop: Primate of New Zealand; Pīhopa Mātāmua
- Bishop of Christchurch: Peter Carrell

Website
- www.anglicanlife.org.nz

The Diocese of Christchurch is one of the thirteen dioceses and hui amorangi (Māori bishoprics) of the Anglican Church in Aotearoa, New Zealand and Polynesia. The Diocese covers the area between the Conway River and the Waitaki River in the South Island of New Zealand.

== History ==
The Diocese of Christchurch was established in 1856 by the subdivision of the Diocese of New Zealand. Henry Harper, who arrived in Lyttelton on the Egmont on 23 December 1856, was the first bishop. The seat of the Bishop of Christchurch was at ChristChurch Cathedral until its demolition following the 2011 Christchurch earthquake. The current seat is in the Cardboard Cathedral in Christchurch.

Before the Christchurch Diocese was founded, it was intended that Thomas Jackson would be installed as a bishop for the South Island, with would his See located at Lyttelton.

== List of bishops ==
Bishops of Christchurch
From	Until	Incumbent	Notes
1856	1890	Henry Harper	Also Primate of New Zealand since 1869; retired.
1890	1925	Churchill Julius	Previously Archdeacon of Ballarat; also Archbishop of New Zealand from 1922; retired.
1926	1951	Campbell West-Watson	Translated from Barrow-in-Furness; also Archbishop of New Zealand from 1940; retired.
1951	1966	Alwyn Warren	Previously Dean of Christchurch; retired.
1966	1983	Allan Pyatt	Previously Dean of Christchurch; retired.
1984	1990	Maurice Goodall	Previously Dean of Christchurch; retired.
1990	2008	David Coles	Previously Dean of Christchurch; retired.
2008	2018	Victoria Matthews	Translated from Edmonton
2019	present	Peter Carrell	Previously Director of Theology House; Diocesan Ministry Educator, Diocese of Christchurch. Consecrated and installed, 9th Bishop of Christchurch, 9 February 2019.

== Archdeacons ==
The Archdeaconry of Christchurch dates to 1866 when Henry Jacobs became the first (apparently sole) Archdeacon of the diocese Jacobs resigned in May 1889 and was succeeded by Croasdaile Bowen, a brother of Charles Bowen. Bowen did not serve for long, as he had a stroke in November 1889 and died in January 1890.

== Archdeacons of Christchurch ==
- 1890–1901: Ven George Cholmondeley
- 1902–1909: Ven Alfred Averill
- 1960–1968: Ven Hubert Coc.ks

== Archdeacons of Akaroa ==
- 1909–1910: Ven Alfred Averill-(Later became Bishop of Waiapu)
- 1959–1969: Ven Walter Davies-including the Archdeaconary of Ashburton
- 1971–1974: Ven Keith Bathurst-including Archdeaconry of Ashburton
- 1975–1985: Ven John Brathwaite-including Archdeaconry of Ashburton

== Archdeacons of Rangiora ==
- 1876: Ven Benjamin Dudley

== Archdeacons of Rangiora & Westland ==
- 1959–1960: Ven Hubert Coc.ks

== Archdeacons of Timaru ==
- 1945–1953 (res.): Walter Averill, Vicar of St Mary's, Timaru
- 1975–1977: Ven John Branthwaite

== Archdeacons of Mid-Canterbury ==
- 1990–1991: Ven John Branthwaite

== Archdeacons of Sumner ==
- 1969–1973: Ven Walter Davies
- 1974–1976: Ven Keith Bathurst
- 1976–1979: Ven Richard Carson

== Archdeacons of Ashburton ==
- 1985–1989: Ven John Branthwaite
