= Maurice Goodall =

New Zealand bishop (1928–2010)

Maurice John Goodall MBE (31 March 1928 – 27 October 2010) was an Anglican clergyman, rising to Bishop of Christchurch in the Anglican Church in Aotearoa, New Zealand and Polynesia from 1984 until 1990.

He was educated at Christchurch Technical College and Canterbury University College, graduating with a Bachelor of Arts in 1951. He was ordained in 1952. After a curacy at St Albans, Christchurch he was Vicar of Waikari then Shirley. From 1969 to 1976 he was City Missioner for the Diocese of Christchurch then Director of the Community Mental Health Team. In 1982 he became Dean of Christchurch Cathedral. He was consecrated a bishop on 17 February 1984 and died on 27 October 2010.

In the 1974 Queen's Birthday Honours, Goodall was appointed a Member of the Order of the British Empire.

Anglican Communion titles
Preceded by William Allan Pyatt	Bishop of Christchurch; 1984 – 1990	Succeeded by David John Coles
