= Michael Brune =

American environmentalist (born 1971)

Michael Brune (born 24 August 1971) is an American environmentalist. He became the youngest executive director of the Sierra Club at age 38. The board of directors hired him in January 2010, after Carl Pope stepped down. He held the position for 11 years.

== Biography ==
Michael Brune graduated from West Chester University in 1993 with B.S. degrees in both Economics and Finance.

Prior to the Sierra Club, Brune was the executive director of the Rainforest Action Network for seven years. He also worked as an organizer for Greenpeace.

In 1999, while working at the Rainforest Action Network, Brune ran a successful campaign to get Home Depot stores to stop purchasing and selling wood from old-growth forests. Time magazine listed this as its top environmental story of that year.

Brune is a regular contributor to the Huffington Post, a progressive website founded by Arianna Huffington, as well as Daily Kos. In 2008, he published a book called Coming Clean -- Breaking America's Addiction to Oil and Coal.

In 2014, Brune was confirmed as the Hillary Institute of International Leadership's Hillary Laureate in recognition of his work on climate change issues. He was then awarded, jointly with Amazon Watch's Atossa Soltani, the four yearly Hillary Step prize.

In August 2021, the Sierra Club announced that Brune was resigning as executive director, effective as of the end of the year. Following an essay by Brune condemning Sierra Club founder John Muir as a racist, a number of long-time members resigned from the Sierra Club and removed the organization from their estate plans.
