= 1881 Castle Hill earthquake =

Earthquake in New Zealand

- Location within New Zealand
- UTC time: 1881-12-04 19:35
- Local date: 5 December 1881
- Local time: 07:35
- Duration: 20–40 seconds
- Magnitude: 6.0–6.8
- Depth: 12 km (7.5 mi)
- Epicentre: 43°08′S 171°46′E
- Areas affected: South Island, New Zealand
- Max. intensity: MMI VIII (Severe)

The 1881 Castle Hill earthquake occurred at approximately 7:35 am on 5 December 1881, with an epicentre located in the area around Torlesse Range in Castle Hill, around 20 kilometres (12 mi) from Cass. The magnitude of the earthquake is generally estimated to be around 6.0 at a depth of 12 km. Published reports claim it lasted for between 20 and 40 seconds, beginning with a jolt described as "sharp" and "distinct".

The earthquake was widely felt around the South Island, with reports as far south as Dunedin. Locally, the earthquake caused soil liquefaction. In the city of Christchurch, approximately 80 kilometres (50 mi) from the epicentre, it caused minor damage to brick buildings, including damage to some parts of the Christ Church Cathedral spire. In Lyttelton, the Timeball Station clock reportedly stopped at 7:36 am.

== Earthquake ==
At approximately 7:35 am on 5 December 1881, the earthquake struck in the Castle Hill area, believed to have an epicentre in the Torlesse Range area around 20 kilometres (12 mi) from the settlement of Cass, and a depth of 12 km. The magnitude of the earthquake is widely estimated to have been between 6.0 and 6.2 (although some reports claim as high as 6.8) and a maximum MM intensity of 8 (severe) at the epicenter.

Anecdotal reports indicate a shaking that began as a "sharp" and "distinct" jolt, progressing to "undulating" movement, which lasted approximately 20–40 seconds and was felt across the South Island in various locations including Christchurch, Timaru, Dunedin, Ashburton, and Greymouth, among other places. In Oxford and Christchurch, the MM intensity was rated at between 6 and 7.

Aftershocks were reportedly felt that afternoon at around 5:00 pm and 7:30 pm. They continued in the days following, including on 6 December at both 2:10 am and at 5:00 am; the former was described as lasting for a "considerable duration" with a "rumbling" heard, while the latter was reported as a minor shake of "very slight character".

== Damage ==
The earthquake caused soil liquefaction, including sand fountaining observed at Lake Sarah near Cass. In Christchurch, numerous brick buildings sustained minor damage such as cracked facades, fallen chimneys, and broken windows, while pieces of the Christ Church Cathedral spire broke away and fell (particularly from the cross at the top of the structure) causing further damage to the pavement below. The flow of water in the Avon River / Ōtākaro was also disrupted. In Lyttelton, the Timeball Station clock reportedly stopped working at 7:36 am, and in the harbour, the Gladstone Pier was reportedly "twisted like a snake".

== See also ==
- 1855 Wairarapa earthquake
- 1888 North Canterbury earthquake
- List of earthquakes in New Zealand
- List of historical earthquakes
