= Allan Pyatt =

New Zealand bishop (1916–1991)

The Right Reverend Allan Pyatt
- Bishop of Christchurch

William Allan Pyatt, CBE (known as Allan; also spelled Alan or Allen; 4 November 1916 – 24 November 1991), was Bishop of Christchurch in the Anglican Church in Aotearoa, New Zealand and Polynesia from 1966 to 1983.

He was born on 4 November 1916 and educated at Christchurch Technical College and the University of Auckland. He served with the Second New Zealand Expeditionary Force throughout the Second World War and was ordained in 1946. After a curacy at St Luke's Church, Cannock he had incumbencies in Brooklyn, Hāwera then Wellington. From 1962 until his ordination to the episcopate in 1966 he was Dean of ChristChurch Cathedral.

Pyatt retired in November 1983. In the 1985 New Year Honours, he was appointed a Commander of the Order of the British Empire. He died on 24 November 1991.

== Notes ==
Anglican Communion titles
Preceded by Alwyn Warren	Bishop of Christchurch; 1966–1983	Succeeded by Maurice Goodall
