= Peter Beck (priest) =

New Zealand Anglican priest

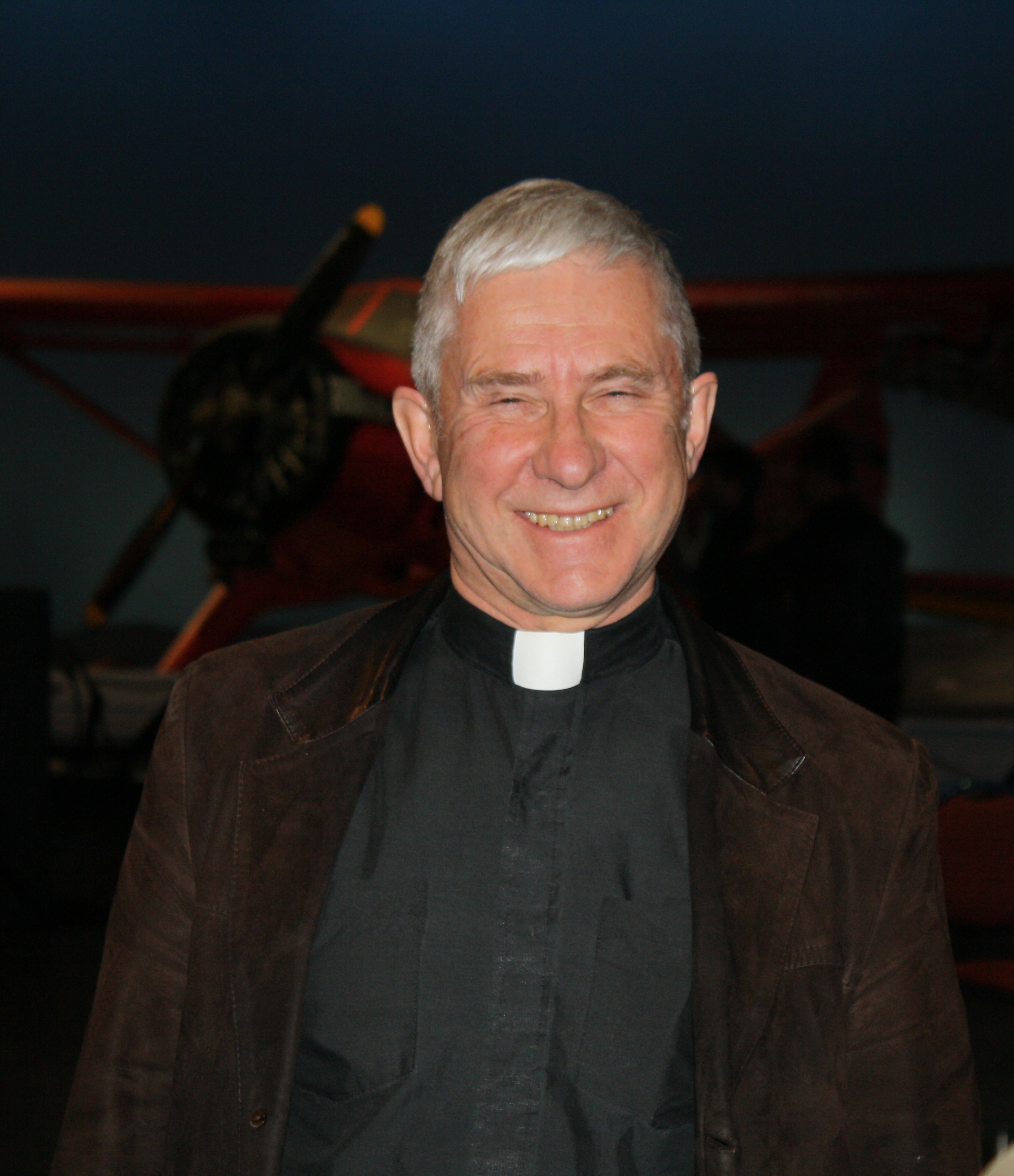
- Beck in 2011
- Born: 1948 or 1949 (age 77–78); Sheffield, England
- Spouse: Gay West
- Children: 3

Ecclesiastical career
- Church: ChristChurch Cathedral
- Ordained: 1973
- Offices held: Vicar at St Matthew in the city (1992–2000)
- Title: The Reverend

Peter J. Beck (born 1948) is an Anglican priest in New Zealand. He was the dean of ChristChurch Cathedral in Christchurch from 2002 until December 2011 when he resigned to contest a vacancy on Christchurch City Council in a 2012 by-election.

Born in England, Beck has been in New Zealand since 1981 and served in various positions in the Diocese of Auckland before moving to Christchurch. He knew the late Sir Edmund Hillary from his time in Auckland, is a board member of the Hillary Institute and spoke at the state funeral of Hillary in 2008.

== England ==
Beck was born in Sheffield, West Riding of Yorkshire, England, in 1948. He is a graduate of Oxford University and was ordained as a priest in 1973 in Christ Church Cathedral, Oxford, England. He served as a team vicar in the Banbury Parish.

== New Zealand ==
He emigrated to New Zealand in 1981 with his New Zealand-born wife and their three children.

=== Glenfield ===
Beck was a member of the team ministry of Glenfield Cooperating Parish on the North Shore of Auckland from 1981 to 1985, and was active in supporting projects for disadvantaged youth. He moved on to be Vicar of St Luke's Mt Albert in Auckland and Archdeacon of Waitemata. During this time he was appointed to the executive of the National Council of Churches and was their representative on Te Runanga Whakawhanaunga i Nga Hahi o Aotearoa. He was a spokesperson for the N.C.C. in support of the 1986 Homosexual Law Reform Bill.

=== St Matthew, Auckland ===
He became Vicar of St Matthew in the city in Auckland in 1993. Here he developed an association with Sir Edmund Hillary and his wife June. He was on the board of the Auckland City Mission as well as serving on the Auckland Diocesan Council and the General Synod/te Hinota Whanui. In 1998 he was a national convenor of the Hikoi of Hope which brought thousands of Anglicans and other supporters to march on Parliament to demand fairer and more just policies for those most disadvantaged in New Zealand. From 1998 he was also the Archdeacon of Auckland.

=== Vaughn Park ===
His next role was as Director of the Anglican Retreat and Conference Centre at Vaughn Park. Since 2002 he has been the Dean of Christchurch. He has been a member of the Christchurch Diocesan Standing Committee and a representative on the General Synod/te Hinota Whanui. He is also a trustee of the Wayne Francis Charitable Trust, and an Associate Fellow of the NZ Institute of Management.

=== Antarctica ===
Beck has a particular association with Antarctica where he travelled with Hillary to commemorate the 25th anniversary of the Erebus Disaster and to commemorate the 50th anniversary of the establishment of Scott Base by Hillary in 1957. He also led the 30th anniversary commemoration of the Erebus crash, when many of the relatives of those killed travelled to Scott Base to take part.

Beck is on the board of the Hillary Institute; the organisation was launched as part of the 50th anniversary visit of Hillary to Antarctica in 2007. Beck was asked by Lady Hillary to speak at the 2008 state funeral of her husband.

=== Dean of Christchurch ===
Following the September earthquake Beck was invited to become the patron of CanCERN, a network of community groups advocating a stronger voice for local communities.

Following the February 2011 Christchurch earthquake, Beck made himself available to the media, and was widely quoted, with one in particular often cited:

The earthquake was not an act of God. The earthquake was the planet doing its thing the way the planet does. For me as a Christian, the act of God is in the love and compassion that people are sharing among each other.

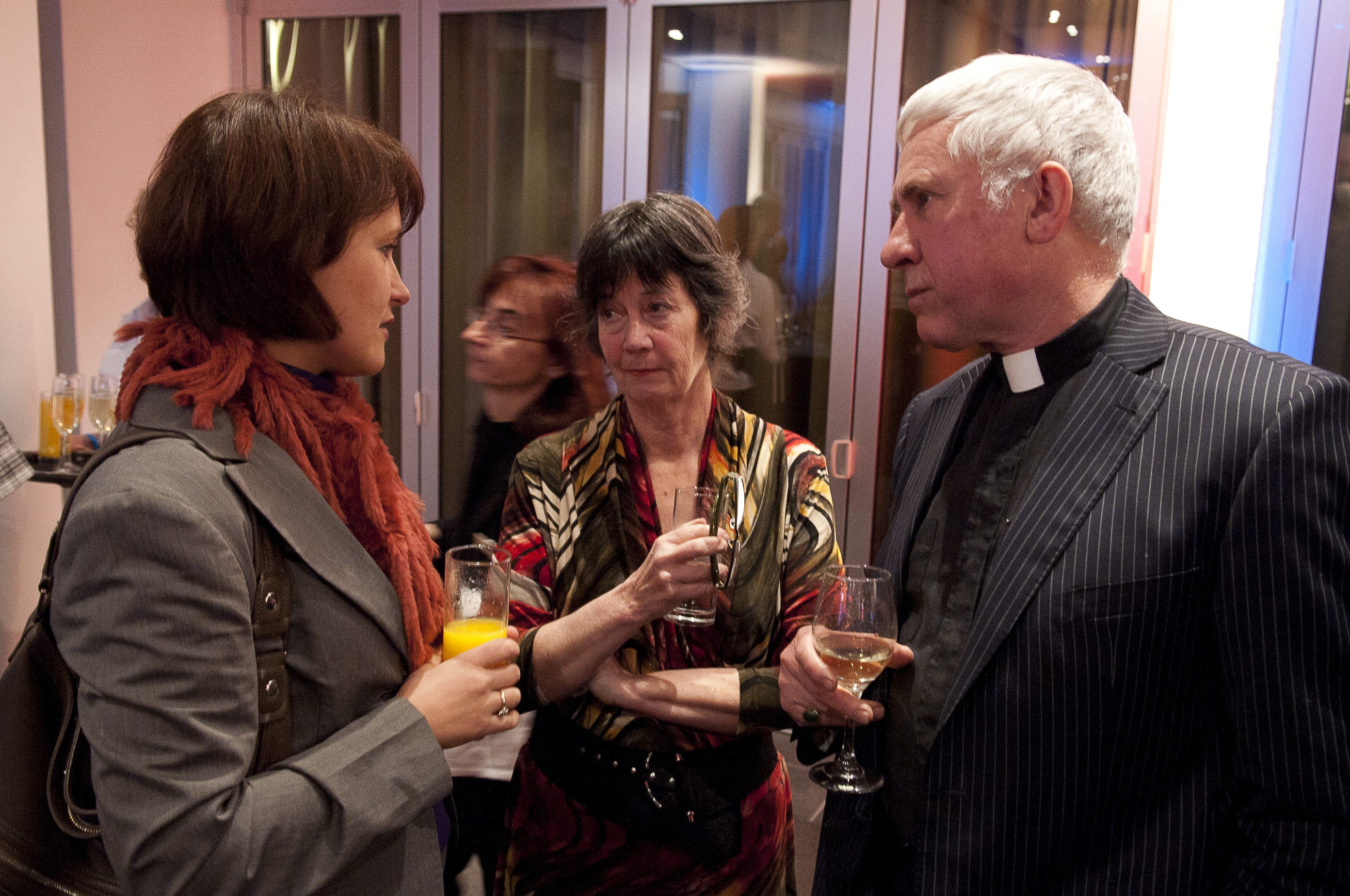
Beck attending the 2011 Independence Day celebration at the US Embassy in Wellington

Gareth Farr composed a memorial piece for the Christchurch earthquake, Nor'West Arch, first performed on 25 September 2011. The title makes reference to a particular Christchurch weather pattern, but is also that part of the ChristChurch Cathedral that received most damage in the earthquake. Beck was part of the performance, reading an introduction including the quotation above. The concert was one of the highlights of the 2011 Christchurch Arts Festival.

==== Resignation ====
On 7 December 2011, it was revealed that Beck had resigned as dean. Disagreement between Beck and Bishop Victoria Matthews was cited as his reason for leaving.

=== City councillor ===
Beck was elected councillor in the Burwood/Pegasus ward by-election Christchurch City Council following the resignation of senior councillor Chrissie Williams.

=== Dean of Taranaki ===
In May 2016 Beck became Dean of Taranaki, a position he held for two years.

== Personal life ==
Beck is married to Gay and they have three adult children.
