= David Coles (bishop) =

Bishop of Christchurch (born 1943)

David John Coles (born 23 March 1943) is a New Zealand Anglican bishop, serving as Bishop of Christchurch in the Anglican Church in Aotearoa, New Zealand and Polynesia from 1990 to 2008.

He was educated at Auckland Grammar School and the University of Auckland. He was ordained in 1969 and began his career with a curacy at St Mark, Remuera and after that Chaplain of Hulme Hall at the University of Manchester. From 1974 to 1976, he was Vicar of Glenfield then Takapuna. In 1980, he became Dean of St John’s Cathedral, Napier and in 1984 of Christchurch. He was consecrated a bishop on 6 July 1990. He was succeeded as bishop by Victoria Matthews. He has been married twice, first to Ceridwyn Mary Coles and subsequently to Joy Coles.

Anglican Communion titles
Preceded by Maurice Goodall	Bishop of Christchurch; 1990–2008	Succeeded by Victoria Matthews
