= Peter Carrell =

Bishop of Christchurch

The Right Reverend Peter Carrell
- Bishop of Christchurch
- Church: Anglican Church in Aotearoa, New Zealand and Polynesia
- Diocese: Christchurch
- In office: 2019–present
- Predecessor: Victoria Matthews

Orders
- Ordination: 1986 (deacon); 1987 (priest)
- Consecration: 9 February 2019

Personal details
- Born: 1959 (age 66–67) Christchurch, New Zealand
- Spouse: Teresa Kundycki-Carrell
- Children: 4
- Education: Canterbury University; Otago University; Durham University

Peter Ruane Carrell (born 1959) is a New Zealand Anglican bishop. Since 2019, he has been the ninth Bishop of Christchurch in the Anglican Church in Aotearoa, New Zealand and Polynesia.

== Early life and education ==
Carrell was born in Christchurch, New Zealand in 1959. He attended Christ's College, Christchurch, an all-boys independent school. He studied mathematics at the University of Canterbury (BSc) and then for a Bachelor of Divinity (BD) degree at the University of Otago. In 1993, he graduated with a Doctor of Philosophy (PhD) degree in New Testament studies from Durham University in England. His doctoral thesis was titled "Jesus and the angels: the influence of angelology on the Christology of the apocalypse of John".

== Ordained ministry ==
Carrell was ordained as a deacon in 1986 and as a priest in 1987. He served his curacy in the Parish of Shirley, Christchurch in the Diocese of Christchurch. Then, from 1990 to 1993, he studied in England for his PhD. Returning to New Zealand, he combined a career in parish ministry in the Dioceses of Nelson and Christchurch, and in theological education.

On 9 February 2019, Carrell was consecrated a bishop during a service held at Christchurch Boys High, and installed as the 9th Bishop of Christchurch at the ruined ChristChurch Cathedral. In contrast to his predecessor, Victoria Matthews, he is seeking an open relationship with the media and invited a reporter from the news media website Stuff to interview him before he took up his post in Christchurch.

Anglican Communion titles
Preceded by Victoria Matthews	9th Bishop of Christchurch	Incumbent
