= Hillary Institute =

International awards-giving institute based in Christchurch, New Zealand

Hillary Institute of International Leadership
- Established: 2006
- Focus: Climate Change
- Key people: Sir Edmund Hillary; Helen Clark
- Address: P.O. Box 578, Christchurch, 8140, Aotearoa New Zealand
- Location: Aotearoa, New Zealand
- Website: http://hillaryinstitute.com

The Hillary Institute of International Leadership is an international awards-giving institute based in Christchurch, New Zealand, inspired by the life's work of (the late) Sir Edmund Hillary, the first conqueror (with Tenzing Norgay) of Mount Everest in 1953.

== History ==
Founded in 2006, the institute was launched in 2007 by Sir Edmund Hillary and patron Helen Clark (former NZ Prime Minister - now head of UNDP in New York), from Antarctica on Hillary's last trip there before his death one year later in January 2008.

Choosing its first eight operating years to focus on Leadership on Climate Change, the Institute selects one Hillary Laureate annually in mid-career, drawn from an international search programme and governed by a board of governors across five continents. They include a number of pre-eminent leadership figures from INSEAD founder Manfred F.R. Kets de Vries (Fontainebleau) to Saatchi's global CEO Kevin Roberts (New York) to former IPCC head Rajendra K. Pachauri and US author and visionary Paul Hawken.

The Hillary Institute is a charitable foundation with its founding trustees operating board based in Aotearoa, or New Zealand.

== Laureates ==
The institute has celebrated ten Hillary Laureates to date:

- Jeremy Leggett (UK – 2009)
- Peggy Liu (China -2010)
- Aimee Christensen (US – 2011)
- Pres. Anote Tong (Kiribati – 2012)
- Atossa Soltani (Amazon Watch – 2013)
- Michael Brune (US - 2014)
- no award (2015)
- Tim Jackson (UK – 2016)
- Johan Rockström (Sweden – 2017)
- Meagan Fallone (India - 2018)
- Christiana Figueres (2020)
