= Alwyn Warren (bishop) =

The Right Reverend Alwyn Warren CMG MC ChStJ
- Bishop of Christchurch
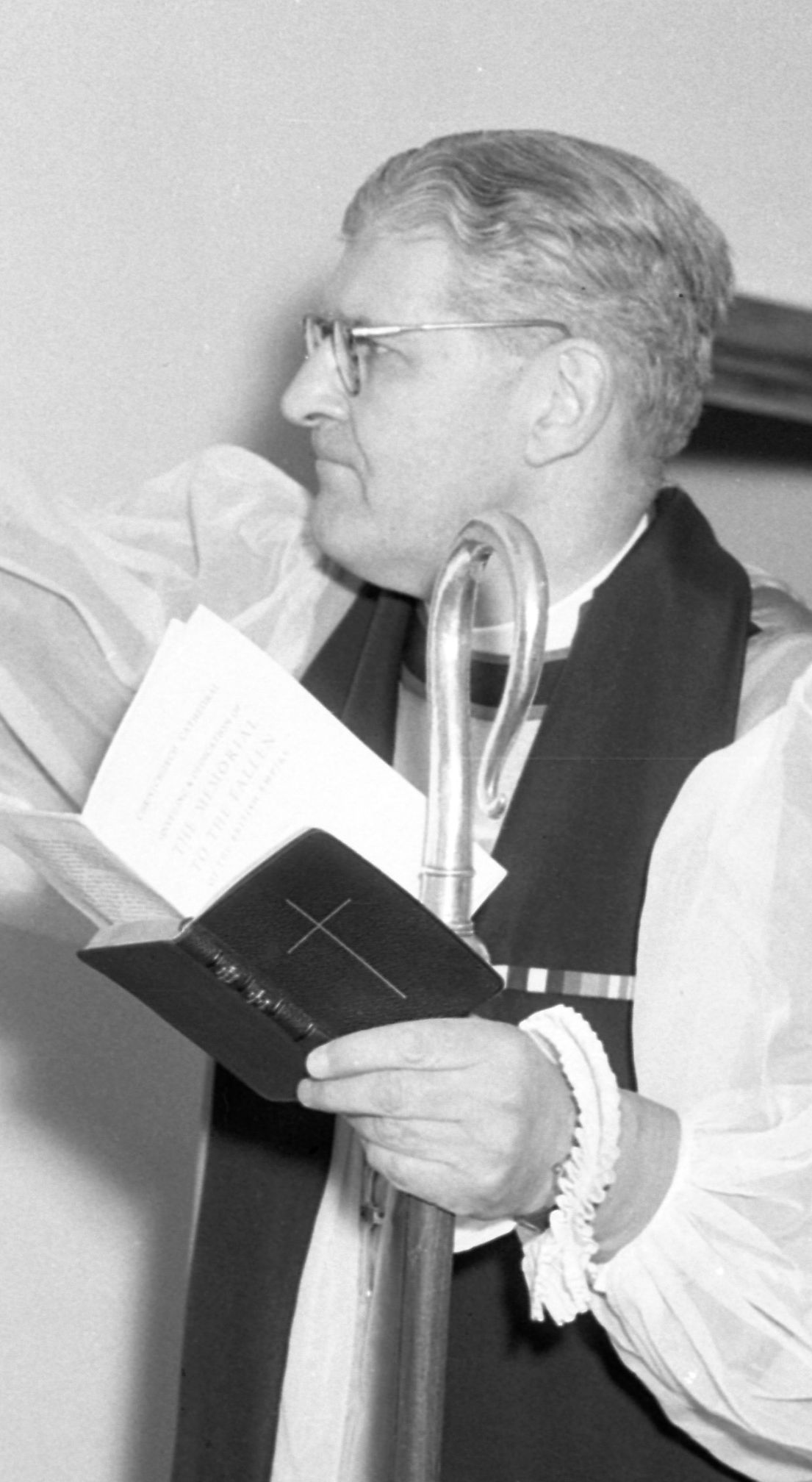
- Warren in 1953
- Church: Anglican Church of Aotearoa, New Zealand and Polynesia
- Diocese: Christchurch
- Installed: 1951
- Predecessor: Campbell West-Watson
- Successor: Allan Pyatt

Orders
- Ordination: 1926

Personal details
- Born: Alwyn Keith Warren; 23 September 1900 Wellington, New Zealand
- Died: 27 May 1988 (aged 87) Christchurch, New Zealand
- Denomination: Anglican
- Residence: Bishopscourt, Christchurch
- Spouse: Doreen
- Education: Magdalen College, Oxford

Alwyn Keith Warren CMG MC ChStJ (23 September 1900 – 27 May 1988) was Bishop of Christchurch in the Anglican Church in Aotearoa, New Zealand and Polynesia from 1951 until 1966 and Chancellor of the University of Canterbury from 1965 to 1968.

== Biography ==
=== Ministry ===
He was born in Wellington, New Zealand, and educated at Huntley School, Marton, then in England at Marlborough and Magdalen College, Oxford. He trained at Cuddesdon College and was ordained priest in 1925.

After a curacy at Ashford, Kent, he returned to New Zealand where he was Vicar of Ross and South Westland and then Waimate. While at Cuddesdon he had met Doreen Eda Laws when she was visiting the college; they married on 3 October 1928. From 1937 he was successively Archdeacon (1937–1944), Dean (1940–1951) and Bishop (1951–1966) of Christchurch.

His period of office as dean was interrupted by war service as a Chaplain to the Forces (Fourth Class) in the New Zealand Military Forces in 1944–45 during the Italian Campaign of World War II. On 13 December 1945 he was awarded the Military Cross for sustained gallantry in ministering to the men of the 2nd New Zealand Division Cavalry Battalion and particularly for arranging and assisting in the evacuation of many casualties (under fire) on 17 April 1945 during the crossing of the Gaiana River. He was later wounded in the foot by German shellfire; this wound would trouble him for the rest of his life. In Christchurch, in addition to improving the decoration of the cathedral, he was involved in the civic life of the city, particularly the Rotary Club and the Order of Saint John. In 1956 he was appointed officer of the order, and in 1961 he was promoted to chaplain. In 1953, he was awarded the Queen Elizabeth II Coronation Medal.

=== Later life and death ===
Warren's retirement as bishop was precipitated by Doreen suffering a stroke in 1964 which left her paralysed and unable to speak. He cared for her for the rest of her life. In the 1967 New Year Honours, he was appointed Companion of the Order of St Michael and St George. He died on 27 May 1988 in Christchurch.

Anglican Communion titles
Preceded by Campbell West-Watson	Bishop of Christchurch; 1951–1966	Succeeded by Allan Pyatt
Academic offices
Preceded by Carleton Hunter Perkins	Chancellors of the University of Canterbury; 1965–1968	Succeeded by Terry McCombs
