= Jeremy Leggett =

British social entrepreneur and writer (born 1954)

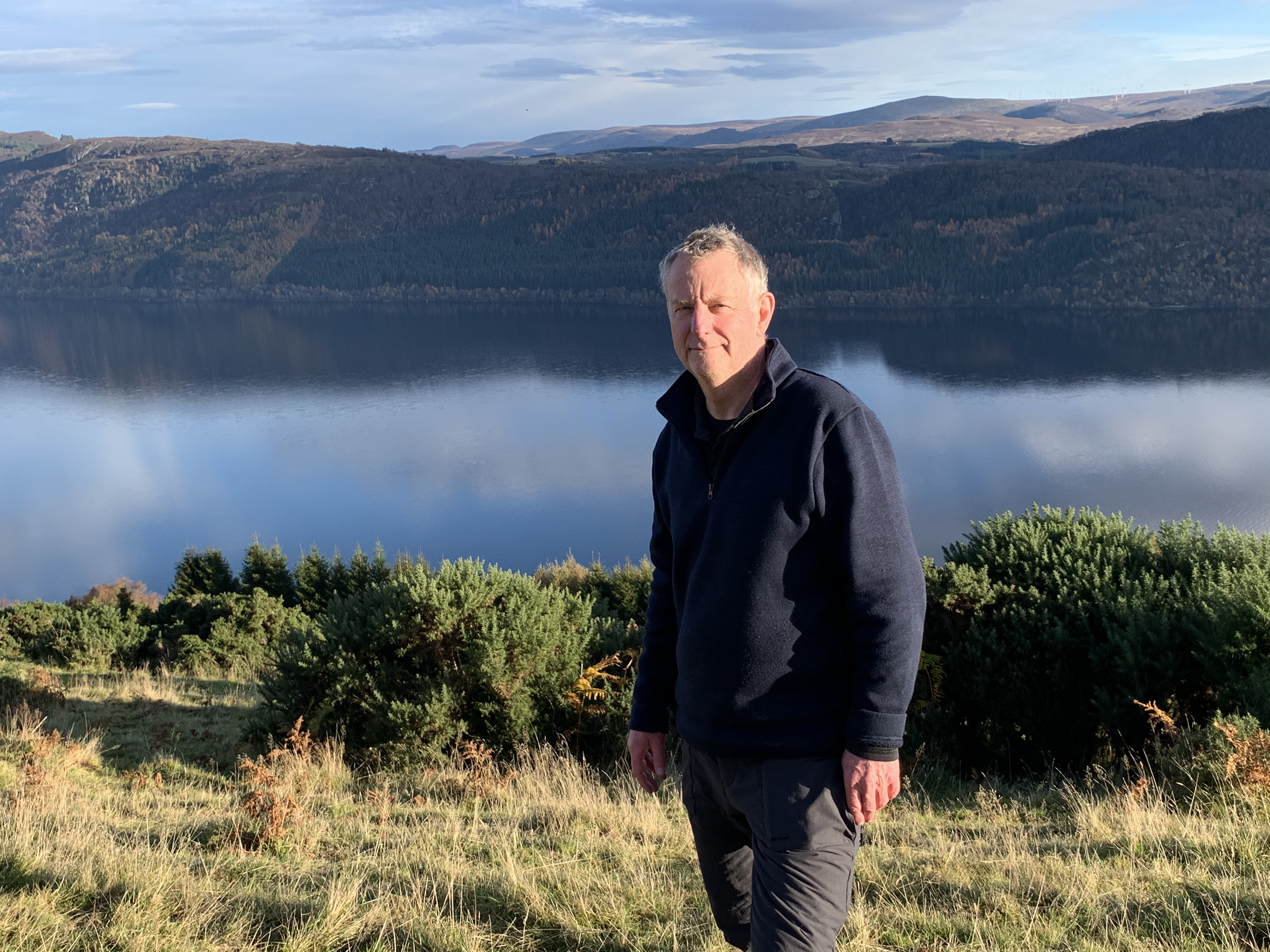
- Leggett at Bunloit Estate, 2024
- Born: 16 March 1954 (age 72); Hastings, East Sussex, England
- Education: Doctor of Philosophy in Earth sciences, Oxford University
- Occupations: Social entrepreneur; author

Jeremy Leggett (born 16 March 1954) is a British social entrepreneur, writer, and winner of the 2025 Blue Planet Prize. He founded and was a board director of Solarcentury from 1997 to 2020, an international solar solutions company, and founded and was chair of SolarAid, a charity funded with 5% of Solarcentury's annual profits that helps solar-lighting entrepreneurs get started in Africa (2006–2020). SolarAid owns a retail brand SunnyMoney that was for a time Africa's top-seller of solar lighting, having sold well over a million solar lights, all profits recycled to the cause of eradicating the kerosene lantern from Africa. He founded, and is Chair of Highlands Rewilding, a pioneering nature-recovery company, since 2020. In June 2026 he founded, and is CEO of NatureProsperity. Leggett is winner of the first Hillary Laureate for International Leadership in Climate Change (2009), a Gothenburg Prize (2015), the first non-Dutch winner of a Royal Dutch Honorary Sustainability Award (2016) and the Blue Planet Prize (2025). He was once described in the Observer as "Britain's most respected green energy boss". He is the author of five books: The Winning of The Carbon War, an account of what he sees as the "turnaround years" in the dawn of the global energy transition, 2013–2015, with an update edition spanning 2016–2017; The Energy of Nations (2013); The Solar Century (2009); Half Gone (2005); and The Carbon War (2000). He writes occasional articles for national media and has lectured on business and society at the Universities of Cambridge and Oxford (UK) and St Gallen (Switzerland). His vision is of a renaissance in civilisation aided or even triggered by renewable energy and nature restoration, and its intrinsic social benefits.

== Career ==
In a first career, Leggett went straight from a D.Phil. in Earth science at Oxford to the faculty at the Royal School of Mines, Imperial College, researching Earth history as preserved in strata including shale deposits, funded by BP, Royal Dutch Shell and other energy companies (1978–1989). In this phase, he won the President's Prize of the Geological Society and was appointed a reader at the age of 33. He also set up the Verification Technology Information Centre (VERTIC), a technical think tank with the aim to demonstrate how arms control treaties could be verified, and served part-time as its first executive director for four years (1985–1989) during the tail end of the Cold War. During this time he also served on the board of Pugwash UK.

Becoming concerned about global warming, he resigned from Imperial College to become a climate campaigner with Greenpeace International (1989–1996). In this phase, he won the US Climate Institute's Award for Advancing Understanding.

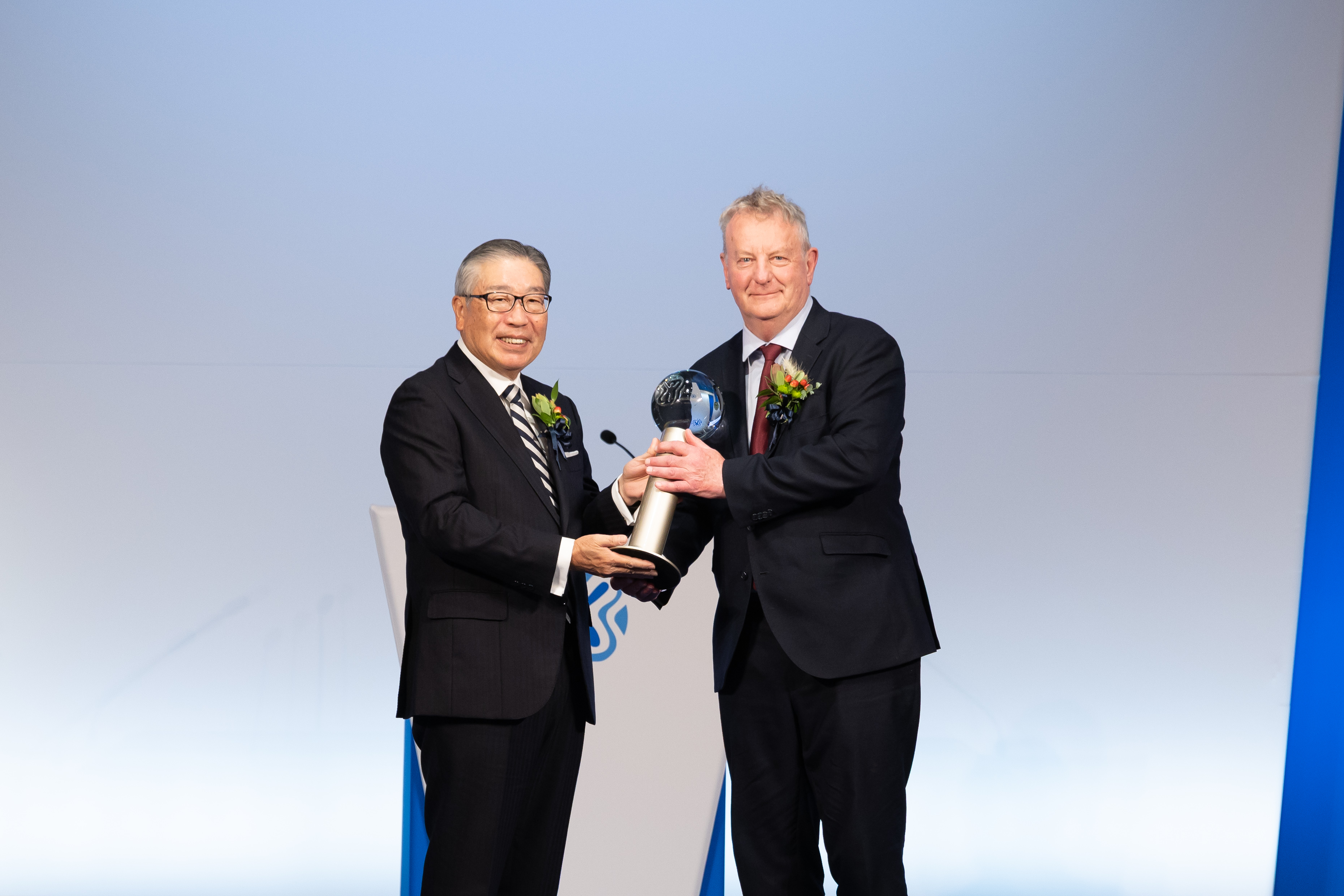
Dr. Leggett receiving Blue Planet Prize from Chairman Shimamura, Tokyo, October 2025

In his third phase, Leggett led Solarcentury as CEO from 1997 to 2007, was chairman from 1997 to 2015 and a board director from 2015 to 2020. The company has won multiple awards for innovation and sustainability, including the Sunday Times / Microsoft TechTrack 100 R&D Award (2006), the FT / Treasury Inner City 100 Greenest Company Award (2007), and a Queen's Award for Enterprise in Innovation (2011). His awards include Entrepreneur of the Year at the New Energy Awards, UK Climate Week's Most Inspirational Person Award, Outstanding Individual Award at the international Solar Industry Awards (2013), Champion of the Year in promoting the green economy at the Business Green Leaders Awards (2014), and Outstanding Individual Award at the Solar Power Portal Awards (2015). Solarcentury was sold to Norwegian company Statkraft in 2020. Awards to Highlands Rewilding include the Adapting Scotland Award at the VIBES Scottish Environment Business Awards (2022) and the Business for Nature Award at the Nature for Scotland Awards (2022). In June 2025, he won a Blue Planet Prize, one of the two top environmental awards in the world.

He also served as the first chairman of the Carbon Tracker Initiative, a think tank which was set up to align the capital markets with international climate policymaking (2010–2018).

Leggett was a CNN Principal Voice (2007) and served on UK government advisory bodies including the Renewables Advisory Board (2002–2006). He convened the UK Industry Taskforce on Peak Oil and Energy Security, a pan-industry group warning of a systemic oil-depletion risk to economies (2007–2013), which evolved into the Transatlantic Energy Security Dialogue (since 2013), co-convened with Lt. Col. Daniel Davis (US Army). Jeremy also served on the New Energy Architecture Global Agenda Council of the World Economic Forum (2012–2014), a group primarily working on "black swans" in energy markets. Between 2000 and 2014 he was non-executive director of New Energies Invest AG, a private equity fund investing in renewable energy, and is a consultant on systemic risk to major corporations.

His current environmental and social purpose mission Highlands Rewilding has the goals of measurably and meaningfully increasing the carbon sequestration and biodiversity of the land, creating sustainable nature based employment opportunities in a rural version of the Green New Deal and generating sustainable and ethical profits to demonstrate a viable new way of land management better for people, nature and the planet. The project also aims to become a leader in natural capital research to produce high quality, evidence based credits reflecting the increases in carbon sequestration and biodiversity it hopes to achieve on a yearly basis. In November 2021 Highlands Rewilding published its first Natural Capital Report detailing the methodologies used, results to date and land management plans. By collaborating with other researchers as an "open laboratory", Highlands Rewilding aims to build a large evidence base that can be accessible for all to support and drive nature-based solutions research. After buying the Bunloit estate in early 2020, Leggett set aside 12 months to confer with a wide range of experts, relevant organisations and the local community.

== Books ==
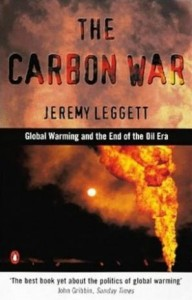
The Carbon War by Jeremy Leggett

Leggett is author of five books: The Carbon War (2000), an eyewitness account of the climate negotiations in the 1990s; Half Gone (2005), an account of the interaction between oil depletion and climate change; The Solar Century (2009), a vision of the solar revolution; The Energy of Nations: Risk Blindness and the Road to Renaissance (2013); and The Winning of the Carbon War: Power and Politics on the Front Lines of Climate and Clean Energy (2016). He is a contributor to The Guardian and the Financial Times. He has lectured on business and society at the universities of Cambridge and St. Gallen, and has been an Associate Fellow at Oxford University.

== Awards ==
Described by The Observer as "Britain's most respected green energy boss", Leggett has been an Entrepreneur of the Year at the New Energy Awards and a CNN Principal Voice. His awards include the President's Prize and the Lyell Fund of the Geological Society, the US Climate Institute's Award for Advancing Understanding, UK Climate Week's Most Inspirational Person Award, Outstanding Individual Award at the 2013 international Solar Industry Awards, and at the 2014 Business Green Leaders Awards, Champion of the Year in promoting the green economy. He was the first person to be appointed a Hillary Institute Hillary Laureate for International Leadership on Climate Change (2009). At the 2009 Rosenblatt New Energy Awards Leggett won in the Entrepreneur of the Year category.

Leggett received an Honorary Doctorate from Heriot-Watt University in 2010.

== Climate change ==
Leggett has called for a rapid strategic withdrawal from fossil fuels and argues that coal should be left in the ground. Leggett has been critical of the lack of reporting by the British mainstream media on the economic imperatives of climate change abatement. Leggett is known for his support of microgeneration technology in the fight to abate global warming. Recently, Leggett has spoken in depth about the great dangers of allowing carbon assets to be viewed at zero risk of impairment if promised action on climate change does take place.

In his 2009 book The Solar Century, Leggett is critical of nuclear power, saying that it cannot come online quickly enough to mitigate climate change; that the nuclear industry still has not found a way to deal with its radioactive wastes; and that investing in nuclear power would mean less money for other initiatives involving energy conservation, energy efficiency, and renewable energy. Leggett also states that carbon capture and storage has a "substantial timing problem" as it will take fifteen to twenty years to introduce the technology.

== Politics ==
Prior to the 2015 general election, he was one of several celebrities who endorsed the parliamentary candidacy of the Green Party's Caroline Lucas.
