= Jeremy Glick =

Passenger on United Airlines Flight 93 (1970–2001)

- Born: September 3, 1970; Saddle River, New Jersey, U.S.
- Died: September 11, 2001 (aged 31); Stonycreek Township, Pennsylvania, U.S.
- Cause of death: Plane crash during the September 11 attacks
- Education: Saddle River Day School; University of Rochester
- Occupations: Sales and marketing executive
- Employer: Vividence
- Known for: Heroic actions on United Airlines Flight 93
- Spouse: Lyzbeth Glick (m. 1996)
- Children: 1

Jeremy Logan Glick (September 3, 1970 – September 11, 2001) was an American passenger on board United Airlines Flight 93, which was hijacked and crashed as part of the September 11 attacks. Aware of the earlier attacks at the World Trade Center, Glick and some of his fellow passengers attempted to foil the hijacking. During a struggle to reclaim the aircraft, it crashed into a field in Stonycreek Township near Shanksville, Pennsylvania, killing everyone on board, but thwarting the hijackers' plan to crash the plane into a building in Washington, D.C., most likely either the U.S. Capitol Building or the White House.

== Personal life ==
Glick was born September 3, 1970, the middle child, and middle son of Joan and Lloyd Glick of Hewitt, New Jersey. Glick and his five siblings, all of whose names begin with the letter "J", grew up in a Jewish family in Saddle River, New Jersey. He attended Saddle River Day School, where in the 7th grade, he met his future wife, Lyzbeth. They became high school sweethearts and were prom king and queen in 1988.

Glick was an American National Collegiate Judo champion while he was a student at the University of Rochester in Rochester, New York, He was also captain of the rugby team, and president of the Rochester chapter of the Alpha Delta Phi fraternity. He graduated in 1993.

At the time of his death, Glick worked as a sales executive for Vividence, an e-consulting company in San Mateo, California.

Glick was a resident of West Milford, New Jersey, where he and Lyzbeth made their home in a small cottage on a lake. At the time of his death, they had been married for five years. Their daughter and only child Emerson, was born on June 18, 2001, less than three months before his death, and was named after her parents' favorite poet, Ralph Waldo Emerson. As a high school sophomore, Emerson delivered a 2017 TED Talk on dealing with tragedy and grief.

== United Flight 93 ==
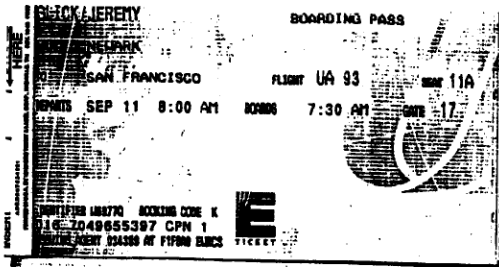
Jeremy Glick's boarding pass for Flight 93

Glick boarded United Airlines Flight 93 to attend a company sales meeting. He was originally scheduled to travel on the previous day.

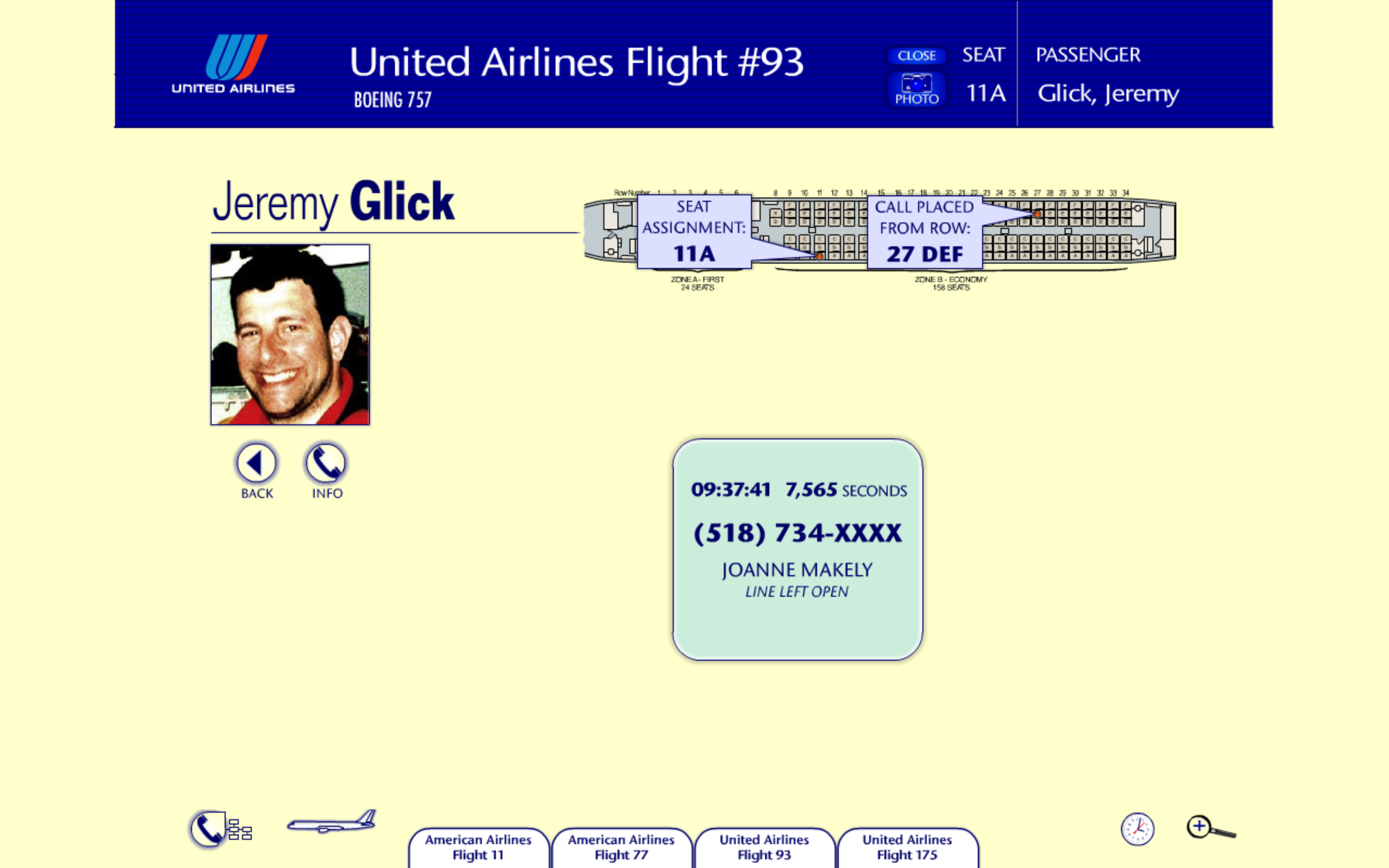
Phone call details

According to accounts of cell phone conversations, Glick, along with Todd Beamer, Mark Bingham, and Tom Burnett, formed a plan to take the plane back from the hijackers, and led other passengers in this effort. Glick's last words to his wife when aboard Flight 93 were: "We're going to rush the hijackers." He then hung up the phone.

Co-workers and family stated that they were not surprised that Glick took action. Glick's brother-in-law Douglas Hurwitt said, "that was my brother-in-law. He was a take-charge guy." Glick's former boss, Thomas Torf, added: "He was a no-nonsense kind of guy. He took ownership of things. Very focused. He loved his family. He was a good businessman. All of us loved him."

== Legacy ==
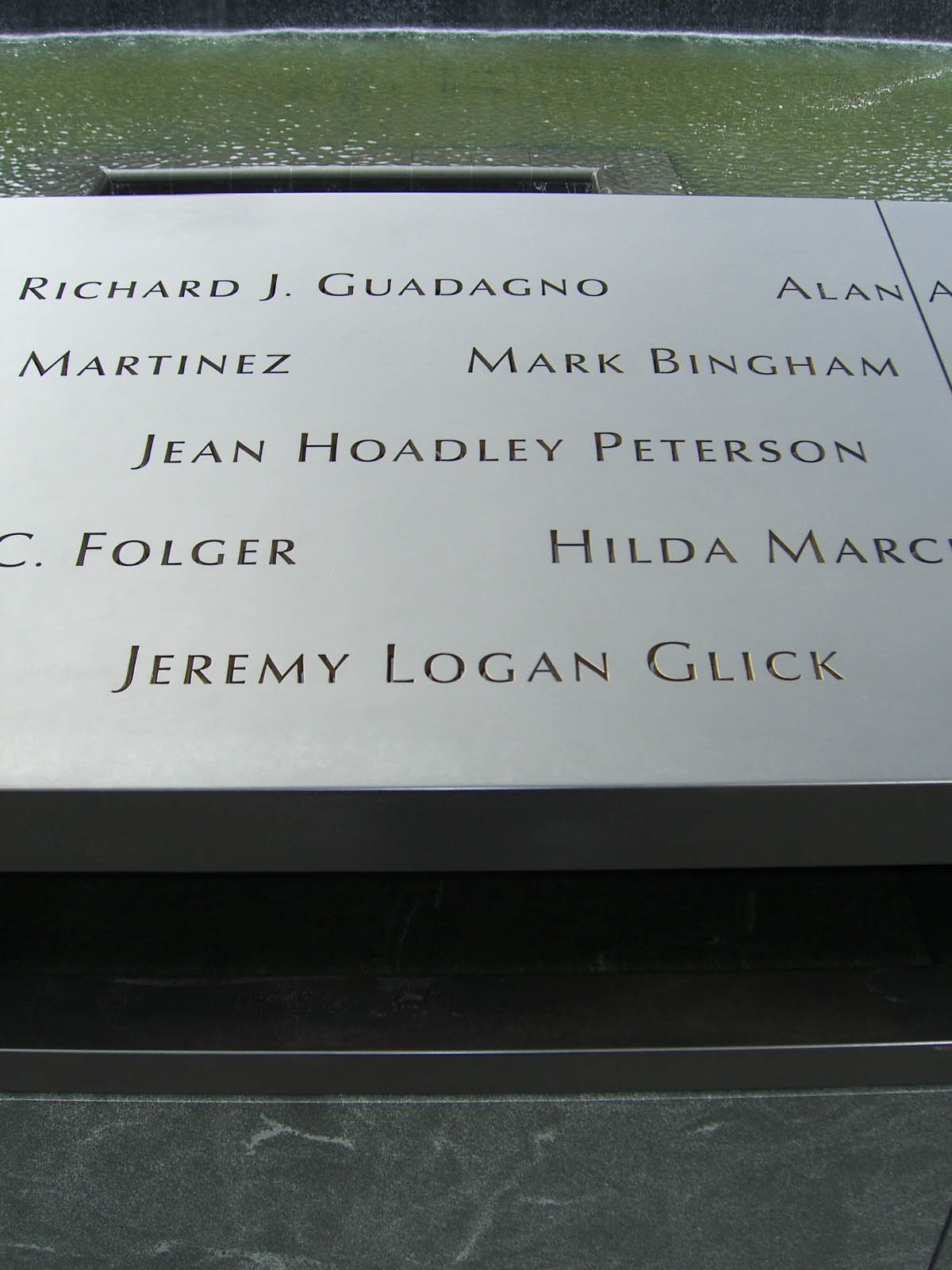
Glick's name is located on Panel S-67 of the National September 11 Memorial's South Pool, along with those of other passengers of Flight 93.

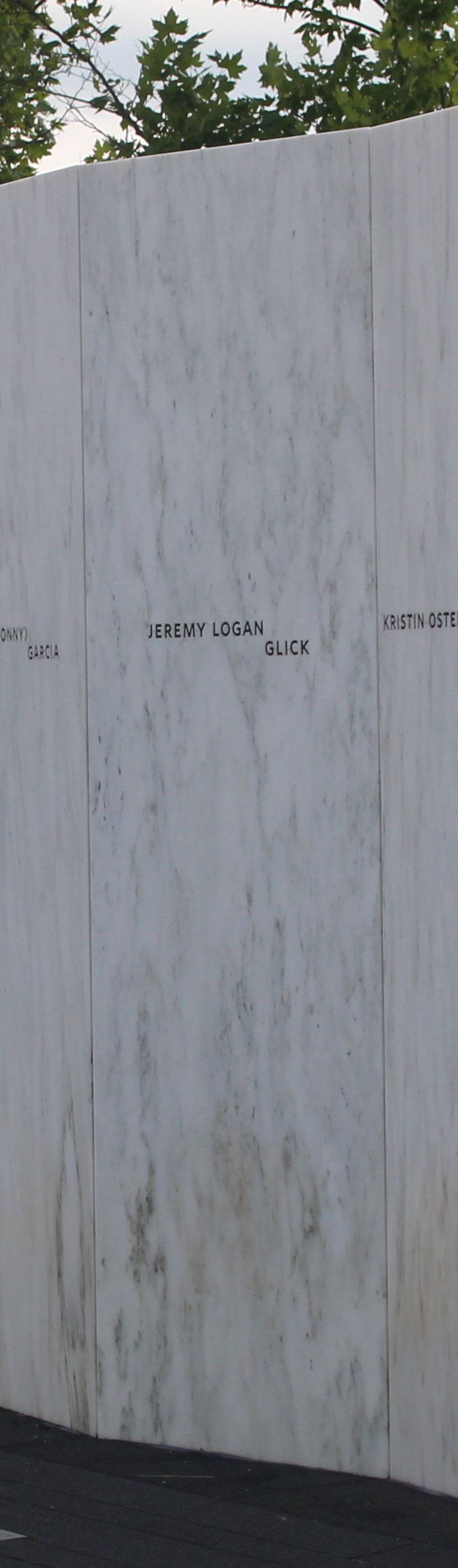
Glick's name on the Wall of Names at Flight 93 National Memorial in Pennsylvania

Glick is memorialized at the Flight 93 National Memorial at the crash site near Shanksville, Pennsylvania, and at the National 9/11 Memorial in New York City, at the South Pool, on Panel S-67, along with other passengers on Flight 93.

On September 11, 2002, Glick was posthumously awarded the Medal for Heroism, the highest civilian honor bestowed by the Sons of the American Revolution (SAR).

Glick's sister, Joanna Glick, who finished tenth in the 2001 Junior National Amateur Figure Skating competition, skated a tribute to her brother at a benefit at Madison Square Garden, for which she received a standing ovation. Joanna, who was profiled in Joe McNally's portrait book, Faces of Ground Zero, said of her brother: "He was so strong. I was thinking I should be strong too. Jeremy lives in our hearts. Love, freedom and bravery live on forever." Following his death, Glick's sister Jennifer founded the non-profit organization Jeremy's Heroes, to assist talented but financially challenged young athletes receive training in order to "find their inner heroes" through sports.

Glick was awarded the Arthur Ashe Courage Award in 2002.

In August 2007, Glick was posthumously awarded the Samuel Eells Award for distinguished public service by his fraternity, Alpha Delta Phi, at its annual convention at Hamilton College in Clinton, New York.

In September 2008, the United States Judo Association (USJA), awarded Glick with an Honorary 10th Degree black belt.

On June 2, 2019, in a ceremony held at the Louis S. Wolk Jewish Community Center, the city of Rochester, New York, where Glick had attended college, inducted Glick into the Rochester Jewish Sports Hall of Fame as its 182nd member, an honor accepted by his parents.

West Milford, New Jersey honored Glick by naming the Jeremy Glick Trail, and the vista, Jeremy Glick's Overlooks, after him.

== In popular culture ==
- He has been portrayed by Kevin Paul in the 2005 television film The Flight That Fought Back, Peter Hermann in United 93, and Colin Glazer in Flight 93.
- Along with other prominent heroes of Flight 93, Glick is mentioned in Leslie Fish's song "Flight 93", and his call to his wife is described.
