= Bamboo Furniture House =

Shigeru Ban building in China

Bamboo Furniture House is a single use residential building located in Shifosi Village, China designed by Japanese Architect and 2014 Pritzker Laureate Shigeru Ban. It is one of 12 of the Commune by the Great Wall, collection of buildings in the Yanshan Mountains overlooking the Badaling section of the Great Wall of China. The home was completed in 2002, and is built primarily using a special bamboo version of Laminated Veneer Lumber developed specifically for this project.

== Concept ==
To take advantage of the project's spacious site, Ban envisioned a single story home with a square footprint and square courtyard. The home is oriented in a North-Northeasterly direction and is horizontally integrated into the site. The concept's low profile drew its influences from traditional Chinese Vernacular Architecture. It was very important that the structure fit into the context of Chinese tradition as well as the regional and immediate environment it was situated in. Ban decided to approach the project as he did with his Furniture House projects and incorporate much of the home's furniture into the walls themselves.

== Materiality ==
Due to the exceptionally low quality of Chinese timber producers at the time, Ban had trouble finding a suitable material for the building. He eventually settled on a newly developed plywood called Laminated Bamboo Plywood, a form of LVL. All beams, floors, interior and exterior finishes were done in Bamboo to ensure consistency of material throughout the home. Bamboo Furniture House was also one of the first buildings that successfully utilized bamboo as a structural material, something that only Simón Vélez had done before. Ban was incredibly interested in learning the construction methods and styles of Chinese Architecture, of which he was unfamiliar.

The project had a limited budget and was constructed in a remote mountain location. Due to the remoteness of the site, Ban had the structure pre-fabricated and his client, Redstone Industries, carried out the construction administration for him.
