= Shigeru Ban =

Japanese architect, b. 1957

- 坂 茂
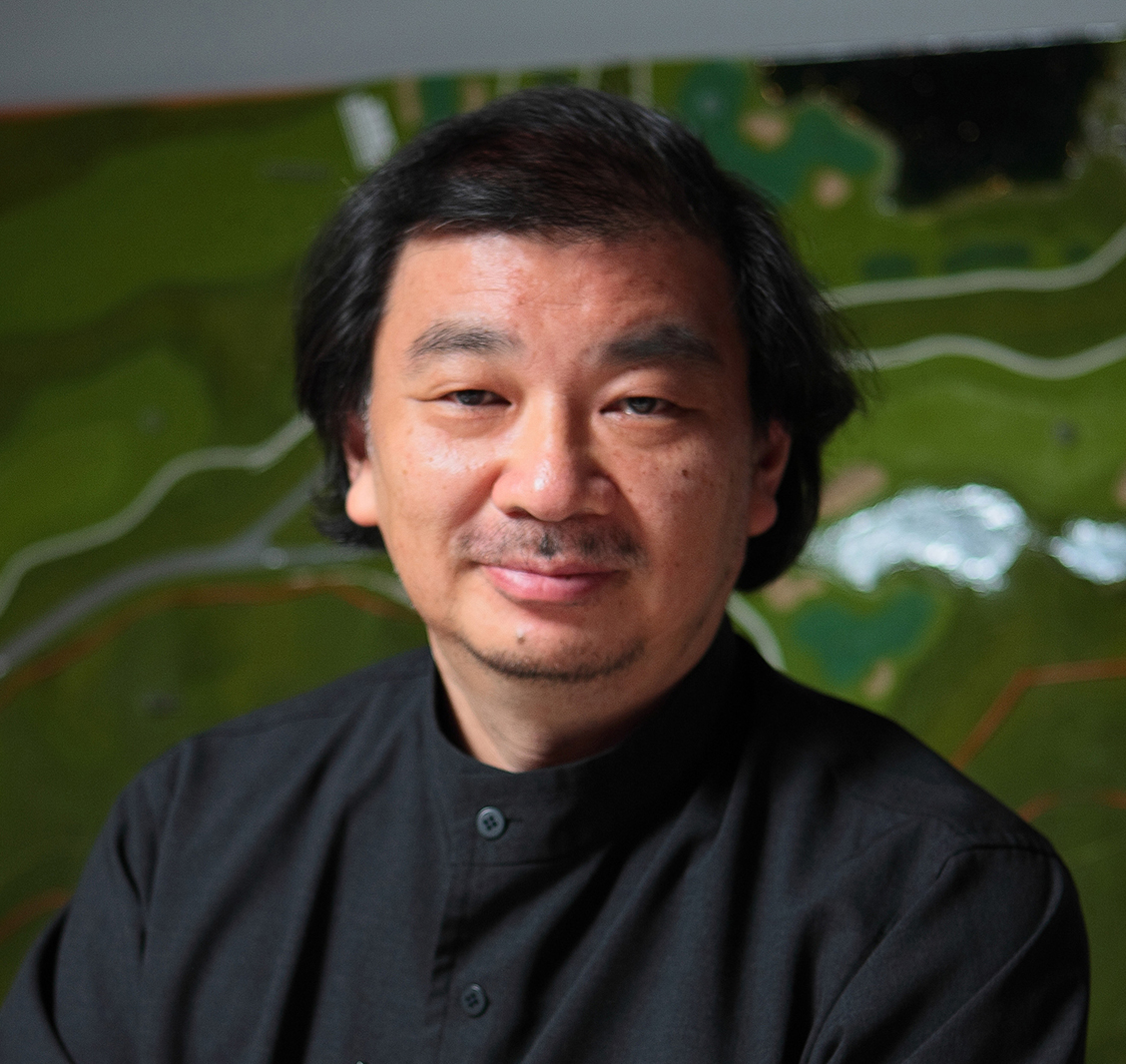
- Shigeru Ban, 2011
- Born: 5 August 1957 (age 69); Tokyo, Japan
- Education: Cooper Union for the Advancement of Science and Art
- Occupation: Architect
- Spouse: Masako Ban
- Awards: Pritzker Prize (2014)
- Buildings: Centre Pompidou-Metz, France; Cardboard Cathedral, Christchurch, New Zealand; Aspen Art Museum, U.S.
- Website: www.shigerubanarchitects.com

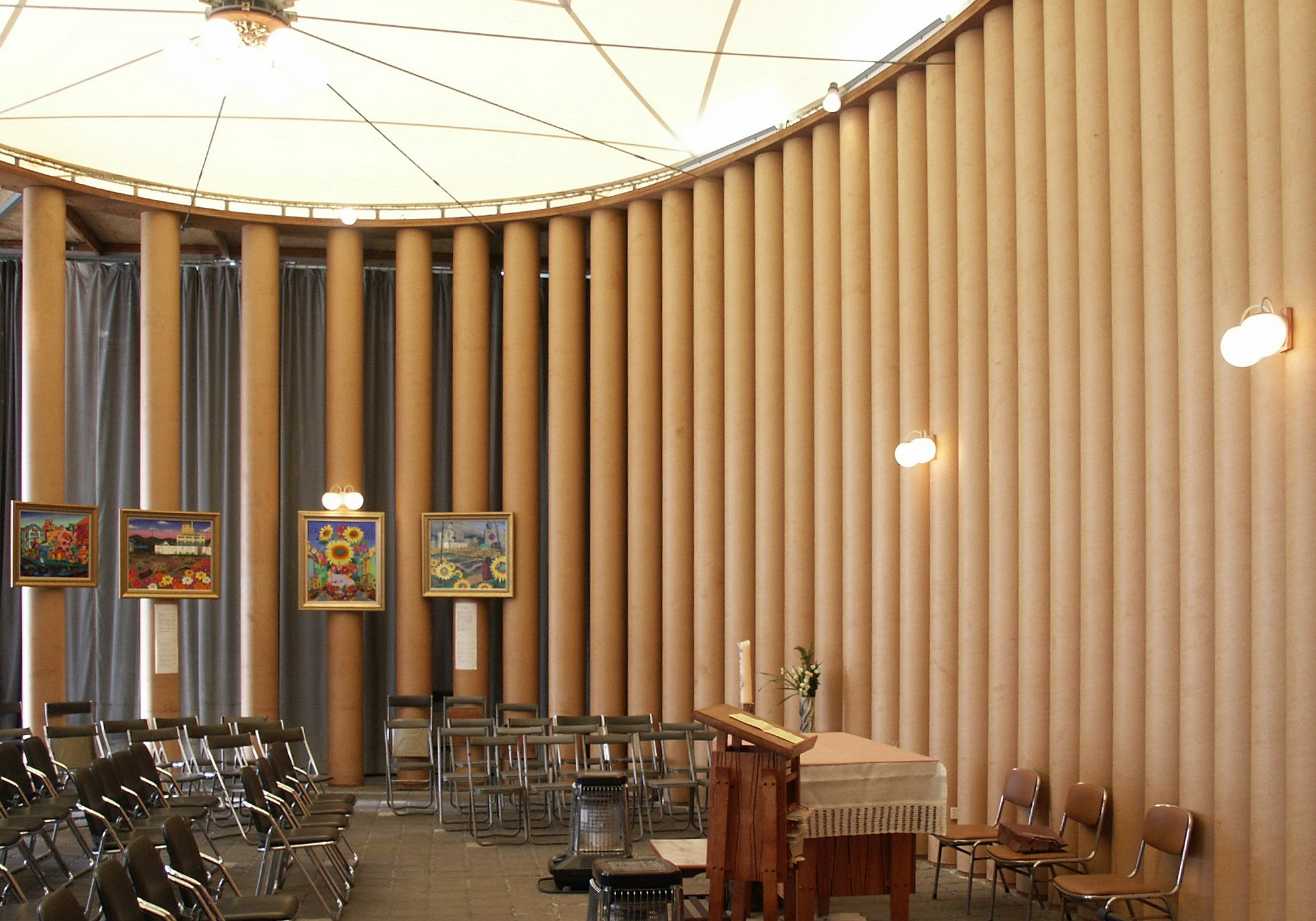
Takatori Catholic Church is a temporary church building erected in Kobe after the Great Hanshin earthquake in 1995. It was donated (deconstructed and moved) to Taiwan in 2005.

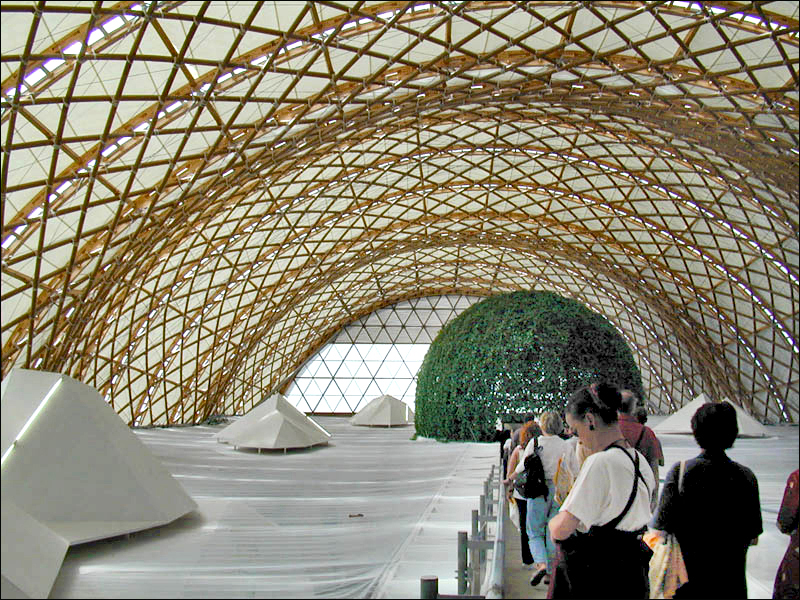
Japanese pavilion at the Expo 2000, Hannover (2000)

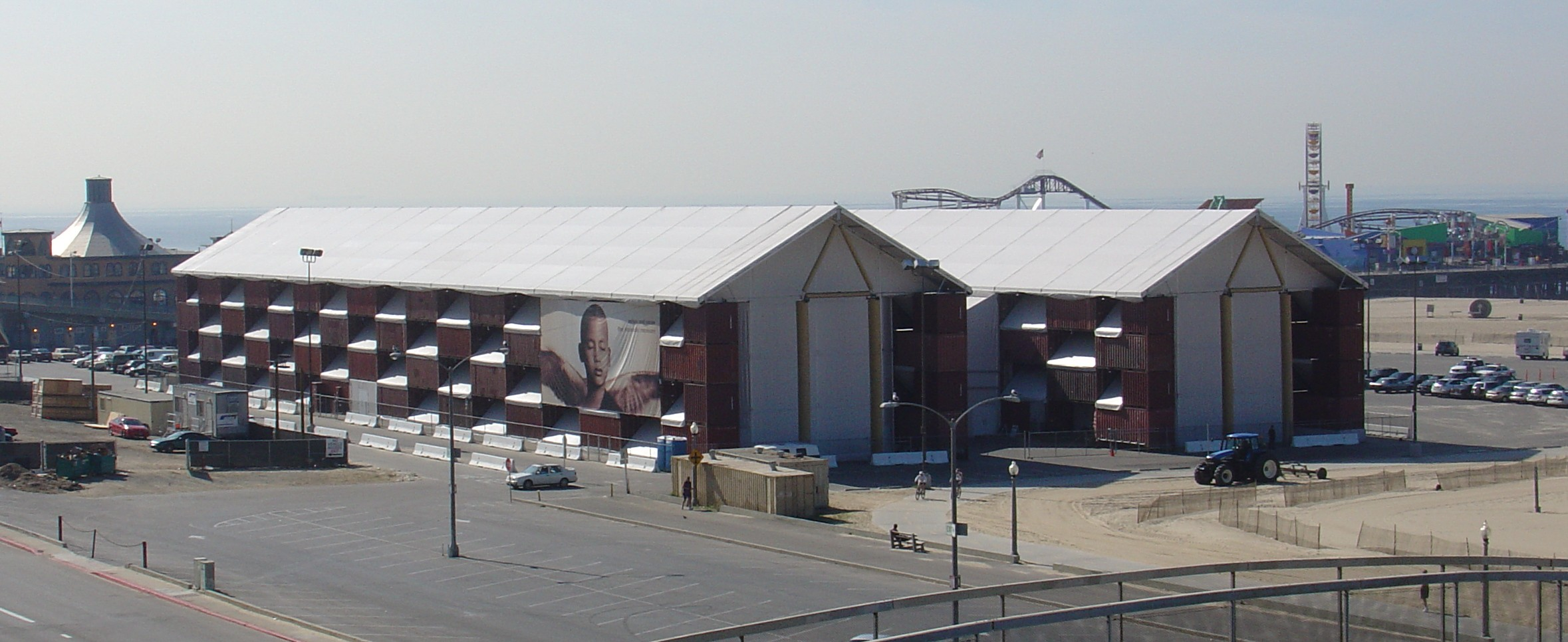
Ban designed the Nomadic Museum with engineer Buro Happold, a temporary structure composed of 156 shipping containers (2006)

Shigeru Ban (Japanese: 坂 茂, Hepburn: Ban Shigeru; born 5 August 1957) is a Japanese architect, known for his innovative work with paper, particularly recycled cardboard tubes used to quickly and efficiently house disaster victims. Many of his notable designs are structures which are temporary, prefabricated, or incorporate inexpensive and unconventional materials in innovative ways. He was profiled by Time magazine in their projection of 21st-century innovators in the field of architecture and design.

In 2014, Ban was named the 37th recipient of the Pritzker Architecture Prize, the most prestigious prize in modern architecture. The Pritzker Jury cited Ban for his innovative use of material and his dedication to humanitarian efforts around the world, calling him "a committed teacher who is not only a role model for younger generation, but also an inspiration."

== Early life and education ==
Ban was born in Tokyo. He studied at the Southern California Institute of Architecture. Later he went to Cooper Union's School of Architecture, where he studied under John Hejduk and graduated in 1984. From Hejduk (who was a part of the New York Five), Ban gained an interest in "architectonic poetics" or the creation of "three-dimensional poetry". Hejduk, the most experimentally minded of the New York Five, had a lasting influence on Ban, whose work reflects continuing explorations into basic geometric elements. Ban's formal explorations with basic building materials helped to lead him into unique structural solutions.

== Design approach ==
For Ban, one of the most important themes in his work is the "invisible structure". That is, he does not overly express his structural elements, but rather chooses to incorporate them into the design. Ban is not interested in the newest materials and techniques, but rather the expression of the concept behind his building. He deliberately chooses materials to further this expression.

Ban's work encompasses several schools of architecture. First he is a Japanese architect, and uses many themes and methods found in traditional Japanese architecture (such as shōji) and the idea of a "universal floor" to allow continuity between all rooms in a house. In his buildings, this translates to a floor without change in elevation. By choosing to study under Hejduk, Ban opted to do something different. Hejduk's rationalist views on architecture provided a way of revisiting Western modernism and gaining a richer appreciation than the reductive vision of it as a rationalized version of the traditionalist—yet ultra-modern—Japanese space. With his Western education and influences, Ban has become one of the forerunning Japanese architects who embrace the expression of Western and Eastern building forms and methods. Perhaps most influential from Hejduk was the study of the structure of architectural systems. Ban is most famous now for his innovative work with paper and cardboard tubing as a building material. He was the first architect in Japan to construct a building primarily out of paper with his paper house, and required special approval for his building to pass Japan's building code. Ban is attracted to using paper because it is low cost, recyclable, low-tech and replaceable. The last aspect of Ban's influences is his humanitarianism and his attraction to ecological architecture. Ban's work with paper and other materials is heavily based on its sustainability and because it produces very little waste. As a result of this, Ban's DIY refugee shelters (used in Japan after the Kobe earthquake, in Turkey, Rwanda and around the world) are very popular and effective for low-cost disaster relief-housing.

Ban created the Japanese pavilion building at Expo 2000 in Hanover, Germany in collaboration with the architect Frei Otto and structural engineers Buro Happold. The 72-metre-long gridshell structure was made with paper tubes. But due to stringent building laws in Germany, the roof had to be reinforced with a substructure. After the exhibition the structure was recycled and returned to paper pulp.

Ban fits well into the category of "Ecological Architects" but he also can make solid claims for being modernist, a Japanese experimentalist, as well as a rationalist. Natias Neutert, German thinker, critic, and poet, marks Ban in his essay as "a gentle revolutionary ... guiding contemporary architecture towards transparency, the spherical and the open". Ban himself quotes: "I don't like waste", summing up his philosophy and practice, known as "Paper Architecture".

In June 2020, he and other architects, as well as chefs, Nobel laureates in Economics and leaders of international organizations, signed the appeal in favour of the purple economy ("Towards a cultural renaissance of the economy"), published in Corriere della Sera, El País and Le Monde.

In 1995, Ban established the Voluntary Architects' Network, a Tokyo based NGO that develops temporary buildings for use after natural disasters and conflicts.

== Use of paper as a building material ==
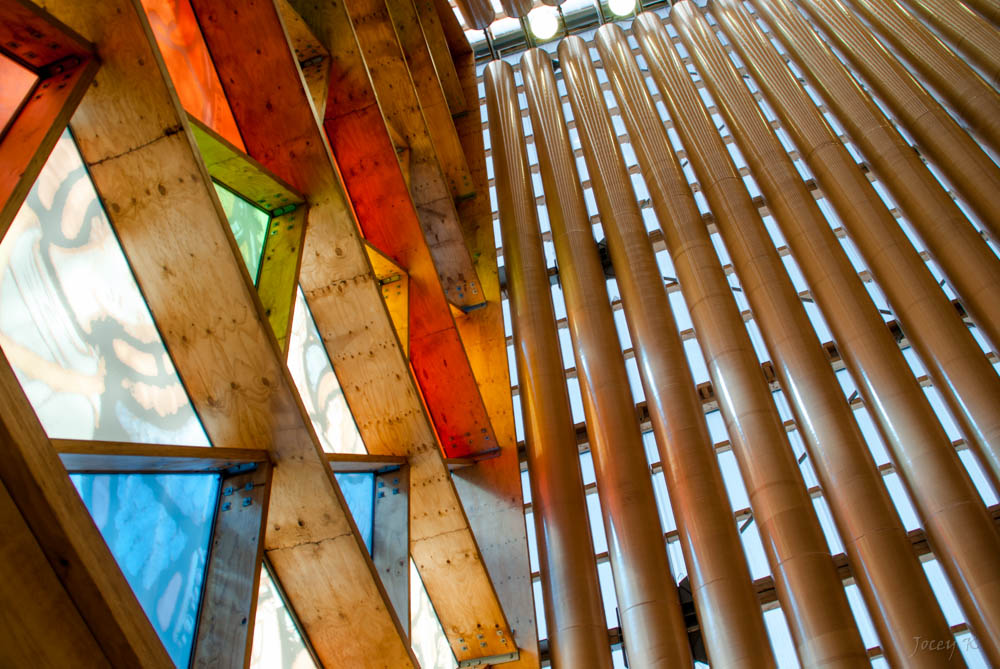
Construction details of the Cardboard Cathedral; cardboard, wood and glass

Ban's experimental development of paper tubing structures came in 1986, before any of his programmatic commissions. He found paper's structural integrity to be much better than expected and noted that it is also available all around the world. The structures are most commonly available from manufacturers providing paper tubes for use in textile factories, as in the case with the disaster relief shelters project in Ahmedabad, India.

Limited material availability during times of disaster relief reconstruction is a major concern and involves increased market prices. Paper tubing on the other hand, not being a typical building material, is comparatively inexpensive and very accessible. In a special case in Turkey in 1999, Ban was able to get paper tubing for free. Paper tubing also proved advantageous for building emergency shelters during the Rwanda refugee crisis in 1994, where the use of trees for framing was creating deforestation problems, and alternative construction materials were difficult to find. The United Nations supplemented wood with aluminum piping but this was very expensive, and in the end the refugees sold off the aluminum for money. The refugees then reverted to cutting trees for building materials. Switching to paper tubing for frames helped save money, prevent theft and conserve the local trees. Ban's paper tube shelter design from Rwanda's Byumba Refugee Camp was featured in a PBS NewsHour story.

In 1995, the magnitude 7.2 Great Hanshin earthquake devastated Kobe, Japan, which offered a reconstruction project to Ban. Not only are the temporary shelters very cheap and easy to develop as they incorporate community participation, but they offer more versatile living conditions compared to traditionally used tents. The 16-square-metre (172 sq ft) modules have paper tubing for walls, with small ventilation gaps between the members, which can also be taped up to insulate.The roof was made from a waterproof tenting material while the foundation consisted of donated beer crates filled with sandbags.

Ban's interest in using existing materials aligned with his minimalist ideology. There was never a question of manufacturing a different paper material as current technologies such as waterproofing films, polyurethane and acrylic paints can be used to improve its material properties. In the design of "The Paper Dome" in 1998, paper as an innovative building material had to meet the rigorous construction codes, so a great deal of structural engineering data was submitted to the government. In this project straight paper tube joists were connected by laminated timber joints. Although the joints were expensive, the low price of the paper tubing made for an inexpensive overall budget. In addition, the 6-foot (1.8 m) paper tubes were waterproofed with liquid urethane to minimize expansion and contraction due to humidity variances found in Osaka-Cho Japan.

Another project, the Expo 2000 Japanese Pavilion, in Hannover, Germany, also used paper tubing but at much longer dimensions of 67 feet (20 m) with 4.75-inch (121 mm) diameters, at a less than 1 inch (25 mm) thickness. It was also waterproofed both inside and out by a coating of polyurethane to meet testing requirements for extreme weather conditions and fire protection. Surprisingly, the paper tubes are very difficult to burn due to the high density of the material. Ban's design allowed for full recyclability of the Japanese Pavilion, in keeping with Expo 2000's theme of environmental awareness. Fabric tape was used instead of mechanical joinery. The fabric tape allowed for complicated movement, and also naturally post tensioned the structure. The main tunnel of the pavilion was designed as an incredibly large space, at 242 by 82 by 52 feet (74 m × 25 m × 16 m) (L × W × H). The fabric tape was used with a buckle system which allowed for manual construction and dismantling. Due to the strict building codes in Germany and the unconventional use of paper as a revolutionary building material, the Japanese Pavilion had to be over-designed and incorporate wooden elements, thus, becoming more of a hybrid structure. An innovative design feature was Ban's use of recyclable wooden boxes filled with sand instead of a concrete foundation.

In the 2024 Taschen release of Shigeru Ban's Complete Works 1985–Today, the architect named among his primary inspirations the Japanese structural engineer Gengo Matsui, who helped him develop paper as a structural material for his projects. When describing the collaborative process between him as the architect and Gengo Matsui as the structural engineer, Shigeru Ban recalls: "He taught me to see the structural engineering process visually, almost intuitively".

== Nepal Project ==
In July 2015, Ban began a project to rebuild homes for the victims of that year's Nepal earthquake. The structures of the homes are wood framed for flexibility and built fully with brick walls. The homes are thus quickly and easily built. Also, the Nepalese can use them for many other purposes, such as schools.

== Teaching ==
Ban is currently a professor at Keio University. Previously, he taught at institutions including Harvard University, Columbia University, Cornell University, Kyoto University of Art and Design, Nihon University, Tama Art University, and Yokohama National University.

== Selected works ==
Centre Pompidou-Metz, France

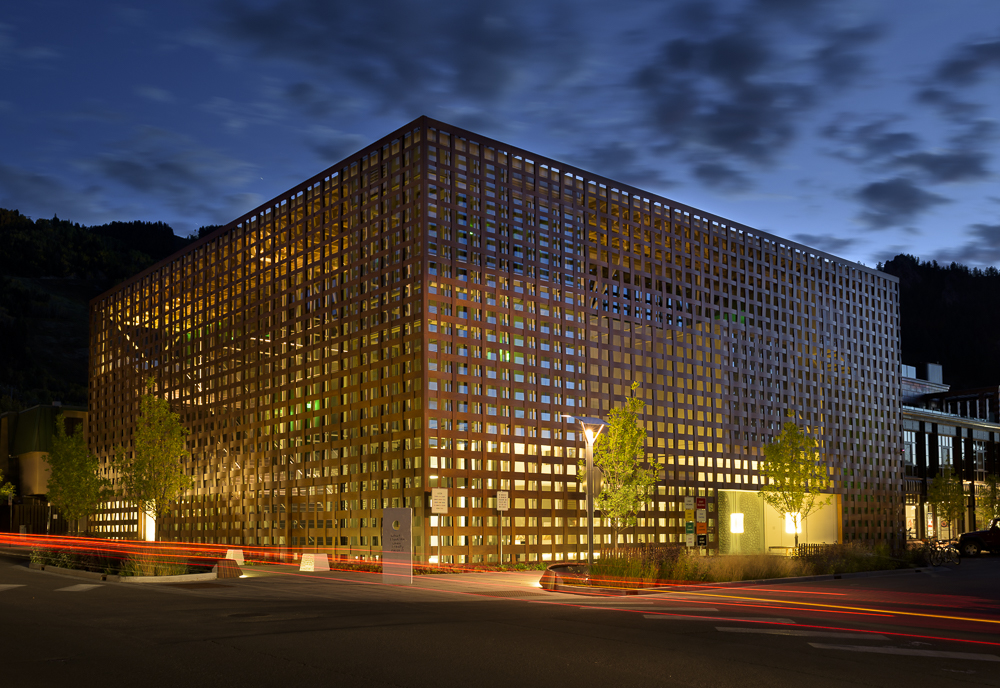
Aspen Art Museum at dusk

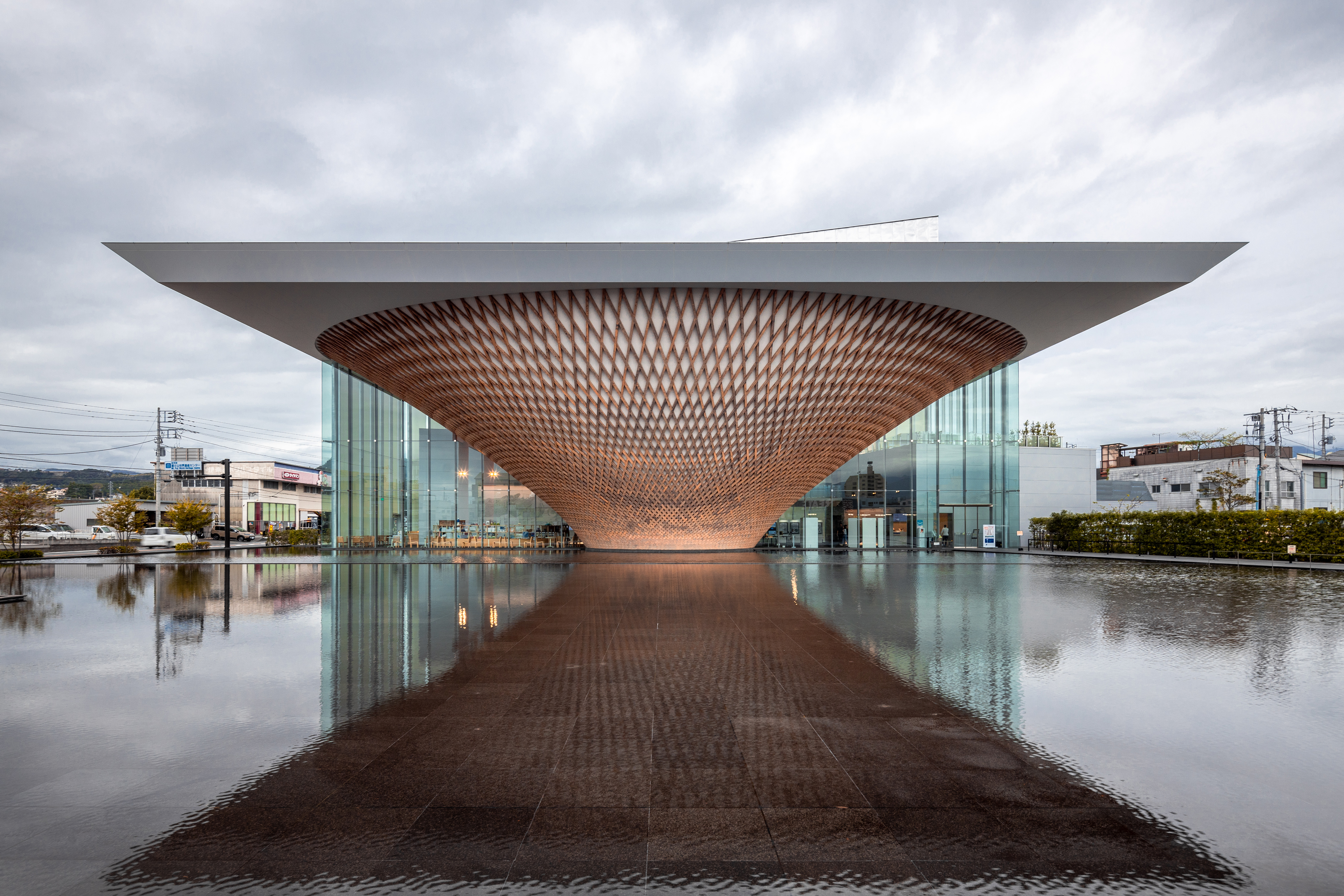
Mount Fuji World Heritage Centre, Fujinomiya, Shizuoka

- Shutter House, Manhattan, New York City, U.S.
- Curtain Wall House (1995), Itabashi, Tokyo, Japan
- Naked House (2000), Kawagoe, Saitama prefecture, Japan
- Japanese Pavilion (2000) at Hannover World Exhibition Expo 2000, Hannover, Germany
- Nomadic Museum (2005–present), built to house Gregory Colbert's video/photo work "Ashes and Snow"
- Takatori Catholic Church, Kobe, Japan
- Paper Dome, Nantou, Taiwan
- Centre Pompidou-Metz museum, Metz, France
- Cardboard Cathedral, Christchurch, New Zealand (2012–2013)
- La Cité du Temps, Biel, Switzerland
- Aspen Art Museum, U.S.
- Bamboo Furniture House, Great Wall, China
- Ōita Prefectural Art Museum, Ōita-shi, Japan
- Onagawa Station, Onagawa, Miyagi, Japan
- La Seine Musicale, Cultural complex and concert-halls on the Ile Seguin Boulogne-Billancourt, France
- Villa Vista, Weligama Sri Lanka
- Tainan Art Museum, Tainan, Taiwan

== Awards and recognitions ==
- The JIA Prize for the Best Young Architect of the Year, Japan (1997)
- Time magazine Innovator of the Year, U.S. (2001)
- Prix de l'Académie d'Architecture de France (2004)
- Arnold W. Brunner Memorial Prize in Architecture, American Academy of Arts and Letters, U.S. (2005)
- Honorary doctorate degree of Technische Universitaet Muenchen, Germany (2009)
- Ordre des Arts et des Lettres, France (2010)
- Honorary Doctorate from The New School, U.S. (2011)
- National Order of Merit, France (2011)
- Auguste Perret Prize for Technology Applied to Architecture (2011)
- Mainichi Design Prize, Japan (2012)
- Pritzker Architecture Prize (2014)
- Asia Game Changer Award (2014)
- World Economic Forum Crystal Award (2015)
- Princess of Asturias Award for Concord (2022)
- Praemium Imperiale (2024)
- Person of Cultural Merit (2025)
- AIA Gold Medal (2026)
- Honorary Doctorate from Wrocław University of Science and Technology
