= Shutter House =

Apartment building in New York City

Coordinates: 40°44′44.25″N 74°0′26.55″W

The Shutter House is a building designed by architect Shigeru Ban in Chelsea, Manhattan, New York City. The condominium building has 9 units and is an 11-story structure, including a ground floor gallery. The building incorporates a layered façade with a unique shutter system, reflecting the industrial past of the Chelsea and the Meatpacking District.

== History ==
The Shutter House was conceived amid widespread redevelopment in Manhattan. Its design began as a simple two-story renovation project, in 2005, when well-known gallery owner Klemens Gasser contacted Shigeru Ban. The rezoning of West Chelsea and the Meatpacking District, as a result of the High Line development was the major urban development change to influence the Shutter House design. Rezoning of Chelsea and the Meatpacking District greatly influenced the Shutter House with an art-infused neighborhood. The Special West Chelsea District was created in co-ordinance with rezoning plans, designated to encourage significant economic and residential growth. Ban was commissioned by his client the same year in which the rezoning of West Chelsea took place.

The rezoning of West Chelsea created incentives for residential development and influenced Ban and his client to scrap the renovation plans for a total rebuild. Although scheduled for completion in 2008, construction was not completed until May 2011.

== Architect ==
Architect Shigeru Ban studied at the Southern California Institute of Architecture, as well as the Cooper Union School of Architecture, in New York City. Ban has worked internationally on projects including museums, houses, and shelters – in particular temporary housing. Ban is also known for his use of unconventional building materials, such as paper tubes and cardboard.

== Building ==
=== Site and Context ===
The Shutter House is located on a narrow lot on West 19th Street, between 10th and 11th Avenues. It is located between Frank Gehry's IAC building to the west, and the Annabelle Selldorf apartments to the east.

Community District 4 was re-zoned, from West 30th Street to West 16th Street, between 10th and 11th Avenues. The re-zoning and creation of the Special West Chelsea District encouraged architects to design buildings that engaged and interacted with the new linear High Line pedestrian park. Adjacent developments to the High Line benefited from the creation of the High Line Transfer Corridor, or HLTC, which is intended to preserve light and air around the High Line. The HLTC transfers development rights from the air space around the High Line to designated receiving properties within the Special West Chelsea District. This program allowed developers of selected sites to increase the floor area ratio, or FAR. The Shutter House directly benefited from this program, which influenced the client and architect to rebuild, rather than renovate on the site. The Shutter House is located in an area that was re-zoned to a C6-2 zoning, which increased the floor area ratio from 5.0 to a floor area ratio of 6.0.

=== Form and Use ===
In plan and massing, the Shutter House addresses the challenges of building on a Manhattan city block. It sits tight on a building lot between a large office building on one side and an apartment building on the other. The lot, a mere 50 feet wide, and 92 feet deep, faces north and south. These tight lot dimensions, strict building regulations (including prohibition of lot line windows), and high property values inspired Ban not only to fill the lot footprint, but also to stack modular units vertically. This desire to build vertically was influenced also by the High Line Transfer Corridor program, as a result of the re-zoning of West Chelsea and the High Line development. Together these two programs allocated bonus FAR to the site of the Shutter House, allowing for increased vertical expansion.

The building, eleven stories tall, is made up of eight duplex units, each with a double height living space. This living space is designed to make up for the shallow depth of the apartments, and to draw significant amounts of daylight into the space as a result of the tall glazing. The division into three bays in the vertical direction results in a variety of apartment layouts and provides each unit with street views and balconies enclosed on three sides. The duplex units range from three to four bedroom apartments, or in the case of the penthouse, a five-bedroom apartment. In each apartment, public spaces occupy the lower level, while private bedrooms and bathrooms are on the second level. The design of the building also takes advantage of both northern and southern exposure, enhanced by the retractable perforated metal screens, and the glass garage-like doors that physically and visually open the apartments to the city.

In addition to the eight apartment units, the building includes a ground floor gallery retail space, and lobby. The inclusion of the retail gallery space is in accordance with the Special West Chelsea District program, which intends to distribute art galleries throughout West Chelsea rather than solely in the neighborhood center.

=== Materials and Methods of Construction ===
Construction at the Shutter House maximized interior space on the limiting narrow lot. Each duplex unit was designed to include mezzanine levels, to maximize light penetration in the apartment. Shigeru Ban was also able to design 8-inch deep floor slabs, the minimal thickness required, in order to achieve the desired double-height space in each apartment. The minimized slabs also allowed Ban to slice the vertical volumes to get an even number of units stacked upon one another.

The Shutter House gets its name from the metal screens, or “shutters”, incorporated into each unit, controlled by the tenant. Typically, similar elements were used throughout West Chelsea, for industrial warehouses. Ban's Shutter House is the first instance where these screens are appropriated for domestic architecture. Contrary to intuitive site response, the perforated metal roll-up screens were installed on the north façade. The screens, in addition to allowing daylight into each apartment, also serve as a security feature providing privacy in an otherwise transparent space. The screens, which are controlled by a motorized roller, are made of standard components. Each screen is 16 feet by 20 feet with a unique perforated pattern that complies with city regulations for facades enclosing habitable space.

In addition to using perforated metal screens as a façade system, Ban designed the glass façade behind them as a curtain wall system. The curtain wall incorporates glass bi-fold doors, supporting Ban's design to open each apartment to the surrounding city context. The windows of the curtain wall do not contain metal panes, as is typical for this type of system, but instead incorporate double-glazed sashes and a hinge in the center. This assembly is controlled by a motorized component which forces the glass doors to open in a manner similar to that of a garage door.

On the interior, translucent sliding doors can be opened to create large public spaces, or closed to create smaller private spaces. These sliding partitions pay homage to Ban's Japanese residential design. In the main public spaces, large panels conceal mechanical and plumbing elements.

=== Sustainability ===
Although the Shutter House is not a LEED-certified building, many sustainable features are incorporated into the design. The perforated metal shutters, controlled by the tenant to allow or block daylight in each double height space, along with the glass garage-like bifold doors, are designated green features. The bifold doors, located on the southern façade open the apartment and allow for natural air ventilation. Open facades on both the north and south sides of the Shutter House are designed to maximize daylight in each apartment. The architectural and mechanical process of opening up to or closing off from fluctuating environmental conditions were intended to increase energy efficiency.

Another sustainable feature of the Shutter House is the building envelope. Each apartment has a partially enclosed terrace, separated from the living space by the perforated metal screens. Behind the retractable screens is an integrated curtain wall system. The curtain wall shields apartment dwellers from unwanted elements like rainwater, drafts, and noise.
