= Ashes and Snow =

Art installation by Gregory Colbert

Ashes and Snow by Canadian artist Gregory Colbert is an installation of photographic artworks, films, and a novel in letters that travels in the Nomadic Museum, a temporary structure built exclusively to house the exhibition. The work explores the shared poetic sensibilities of human beings and animals. Ashes and Snow has traveled to Venice, New York City, Santa Monica, Tokyo, and Mexico City. To date, Ashes and Snow has attracted more than 10 million visitors, making it the most attended exhibition by a living artist in history.

== Description ==
Each exhibition consists of more than fifty large-scale mixed media photographic artworks and three film installations. The photographic artworks measure approximately 3.5 by 2.5 meters (11.5 by 8.2 ft). Each one is created using an encaustic process on handmade Japanese paper. The films include one 60-minute full-length 35mm film and two short “haiku” films. None of the photographic or film images have been digitally collaged or superimposed.

The films are poetic narratives, rather than documentaries. The full-length feature Ashes and Snow: The Film was edited by two-time Oscar-winner Pietro Scalia. It is narrated by Laurence Fishburne (English version), Enrique Rocha (Spanish version), Ken Watanabe (Japanese version), and Jeanne Moreau (French version). Narrations are forthcoming in Portuguese, Russian, Chinese, Arabic, German, and Italian. Musical collaborators include: Patrick Cassidy, Michael Brook, David Darling, Heiner Goebbels, Lisa Gerrard, Lukas Foss, Nusrat Fateh Ali Khan, Jóhann Jóhannsson and Djivan Gasparyan.

The title Ashes and Snow refers to the literary component of the exhibition—a fictional account of a man who, over the course of a yearlong journey, composes 365 letters to his wife. Fragments of the letters comprise the narration in the films. Ashes and Snow: A Novel in Letters by Gregory Colbert was first published in 2004.

Since 1992, Gregory Colbert has travelled to locations around the world to film and photograph interactions between human beings and animals.

The public debut of Ashes and Snow took place in 2002 at the Arsenale in Venice.

== Nomadic Museum ==
Colbert originally conceived of the idea for a sustainable traveling museum in 1999. He imagined a structure that could easily be assembled in ports of call around the world, providing a transitory environment for his work on its global journey. The first public installation of Ashes and Snow at the Arsenale in Venice, which opened in 2002, inspired the aesthetics and architectural concepts used in the Nomadic Museum.

The first Nomadic Museum, designed by Japanese architect Shigeru Ban and engineers Buro Happold, debuted with the opening of Ashes and Snow in New York City in March 2005. The museum then traveled to Santa Monica, California, in 2006, Tokyo in 2007, and Mexico City in 2008.

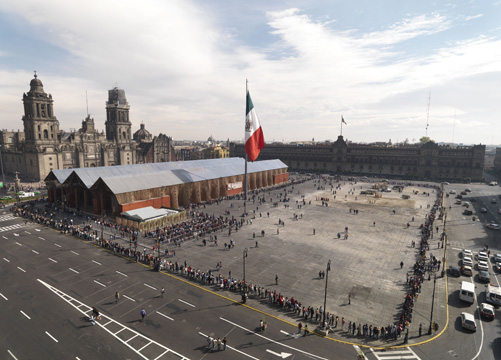
Opening Day of Ashes and Snow at the Nomadic Museum, Mexico City, January 19, 2008

Colbert transformed the interior of the Arsenale using atmospheric elements including stone, curtains made from one-million pressed paper tea bags from Sri Lanka, and minimalist lighting techniques. Founded in 1104, the Arsenale was originally used to build and launch long ships to sea via the Venetian canals. The interior architecture of the structure provided an ideal setting for Ashes and Snow: the monumental space gracefully accommodated Colbert's large-format photographic artworks and films. The show was a critical and popular success, and remains one of the most attended exhibitions by any single artist in Europe.

Originally made of shipping containers, the architectural design evolves as it travels. The most recent Nomadic Museum, in the Zócalo, Mexico City was the largest bamboo structure ever created. Designed by Colombian architect Simón Vélez in collaboration with Colbert, the structure occupied 5,130 square meters (55,200 square feet) containing two galleries and three distinct theaters. For the first time, the Nomadic Museum incorporated water as a design element to recall the unique history of Mexico City, which was once surrounded by canals. This architectural choice honored the symbolic significance of the Zócalo as the center of Mexico-Tenochtitlan, a city founded by the Aztecs on a small island in the middle of Lake Texcoco in 1325.

Like other elements of Ashes and Snow, the museum is an ongoing project that will transform in new locations to adapt to its environment and the evolving artistic content of the exhibition itself. Colbert continues to collaborate with innovative architects to integrate the most recent advances in sustainable architecture and give new expression to the museum as it travels.

The Nomadic Museum, the traveling home of Ashes and Snow, is charted to travel the globe with no final destination.

== Critical reception ==
Ashes and Snow has been covered by numerous major news outlets in North America, South America, Europe, Asia and Africa, including CNN, BBC International, Fox News and CCTV (China).

Critical reception of the exhibition has been largely positive. In one of the first reviews of Ashes and Snow, Alan Riding wrote for The New York Times, "The earth-tone photographs are...windows to a world in which silence and patience govern time." Modern Painters, art critic Joseph Giovannini wrote: “The Nomadic Museum restores the possibility of wonder to museums whose excesses of clarity and light have banished the shadows. The power of the show and the power of the building are so reciprocal that it is difficult to separate the dancer from the dance. Colbert and Ban condition the senses of the visitors to facilitate their psychological entry into the space of the photographs, to deliver the message that man is not, and cannot be, separate from the nature within which he evolved... Ashes and Snow is a show that is disarmingly, and grandly, simple." A Japanese edition of Newsweek praised the exhibition as "an expression of the poetic possibilities of a harmonious relationship between animals and man.” In The Globe and Mail, Simon Houpt wrote that "Colbert’s work operates in a parallel universe to ours, an earnest, refreshing, post-ironic world where pure wonder and awe still reside." Felicity Glover wrote for the South China Morning Post, "Colbert's images are mind-blowing; more so upon learning that none of them have been digitally altered or superimposed... The sepia and umber tones give the photographs — printed in a distinctive encaustic process on handmade Japanese paper — a sense of timelessness; they could have been taken now or 100 years ago."

However, not all reviews of Ashes and Snow have been favorable. A review in The New York Times described it as "an exercise in conspicuous narcissism that is off the charts, even by today's standards," criticizing its colonialism-tinged portrayals of non-Western subjects and its "derivative" imagery. KCRW's art critic Edward Goldman referred to the exhibition as "snake oil from a travelling art salesman," declaring that the imagery was likely to appeal to those who "are inclined to open [their] hearts and wallets to the rhetoric of TV evangelists like Pat Robertson and Jerry Falwell." Author and critic Amardeep Singh was "deeply annoyed by the strong current of exoticism and artificiality," finding fault with the "manipulative environment of the gallery," which "plays up a 'spiritual' and 'exotic' atmosphere that nullifies any objective quality the photographs themselves might have."
