= Gregory Colbert =

Canadian photographer

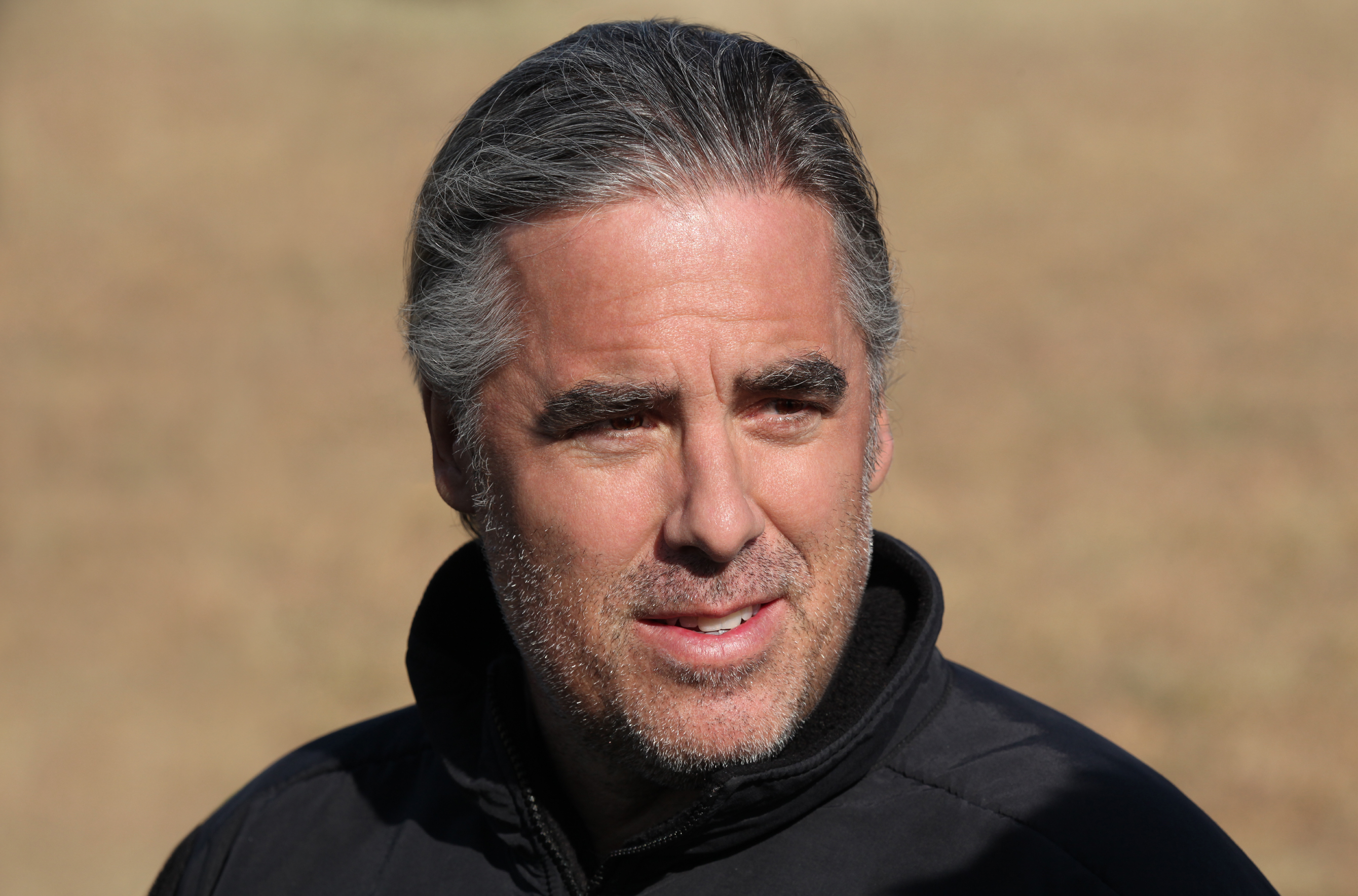
- Gregory Colbert in Tanzania
- Born: 1960 (age 65–66); Toronto, Ontario, Canada
- Occupation: Photographer

Gregory Colbert (born 1960) is a Canadian filmmaker and photographer best known as the creator of Ashes and Snow, an exhibition of photographic artworks and films housed in the Nomadic Museum. Colbert sees himself as an apprentice to nature. His works are collaborations between humans and other species that express the poetic sensibilities and imaginations of human and animals. His images offer an inclusive non-hierarchical vision of the natural world, one that depicts an interdependence and symmetry between humanity and the rest of life. In describing his vision, Colbert has said, '"I would define what I do as storytelling…what’s interesting is to have an expression in an orchestra—and I’m just one musician in the orchestra. Unfortunately, as a species we’ve turned our back to the orchestra. I’m all about opening up the orchestra, not just to other humans, but to other species.'"

== Career ==
Born in Toronto, Ontario, Canada, Colbert began his career in Paris in 1983 making documentary films on social issues. Film-making led to fine arts photography. Colbert's first exhibition, Timewaves, opened in 1992 at the Museum of Elysée in Switzerland to wide critical acclaim.

For the next ten years, Colbert did not publicly exhibit his art or show any films. Instead, he traveled to such places as Antarctica, India, Egypt, Burma, Tonga, Australia, Malaysia, Sri Lanka, Namibia, Kenya, Tanzania, Thailand, China, the Arctic, the Azores, and Borneo. Elephants, whales, manatees, sacred ibis, cranes, eagles, gyrfalcons, rhinoceros hornbills, cheetahs, leopards, African wild dogs (Lycaon pictus), caracals, baboons, eland, meerkats, gibbons, orangutans, penguins, pandas, polar bears, lions, giant Pacific manta rays, and saltwater crocodiles are among the animals he has filmed and photographed. Human collaborators include San bushmen, Tsaatan, Lisu, Maasai, Chong, Kazakhs, and people from other indigenous tribes around the world. Colbert, who calls animals "nature's living masterpieces," photographs and films both wild animals and those that have been habituated to human contact in their native environments. The images record what he saw through the lens of his camera without the use of digital collaging.

In 2000, he purchased the largest Polaroid camera in the world, the so-called 40 x 80 Museum Camera, which he purchased from the Polaroid Corporation and relocated to New York. Renamed "Moby C", it was used by Joe McNally in 2001 to make large format portraits in the aftermath of the attack on the World Trade Center. The photographs were exhibited under the name "Faces of Ground Zero — Portraits of the Heroes of September 11th".

== Ashes and Snow ==
Long before its public debut, Ashes and Snow enjoyed the support of a devoted group of private collectors and key people in the art world. In an open letter dated March 1, 1995, Charles-Henri Favrod, Director and Curator of the Musée de l’Elysée in Lausanne, Switzerland, wrote, "Ashes and Snow is written in the language of dreams….The exhibition and the film are not about ‘inventing’ new images of being ‘modern.’ Instead Colbert is trying to return the image to its purest state, to touch the heart, to enchant, to remember forgotten ideals, and to show that all truth and reality is classical and eternal."

In 2002, Colbert presented Ashes and Snow in Venice, Italy. An April 9, 2002 review in The Globe and Mail stated, "Colbert unveiled Ashes and Snow, an exhibition of images and photographs unprecedented in both scope and scale. Covering 12,600 square meters, it is billed as one of the largest one-man shows in the history of Europe."

In spring 2005, the show opened in New York City in the Nomadic Museum, a temporary structure built to house the exhibition. Ashes and Snow and the Nomadic Museum then traveled to Santa Monica in 2006, Tokyo in 2007, and Mexico City in 2008. To date, Ashes and Snow has attracted over 10 million visitors, making it the most attended exhibition by a living artist in history.

Ashes and Snow has been a critical and popular success. Photo magazine declared, "A new master is born." Ashes and Snow has been described as "extraordinary" by the Economist, and "distinctive . . . monumental in every sense" by the Wall Street Journal. Stern magazine declared that the photographs are "fascinating," and Vanity Fair described Gregory Colbert as "Best of the Best." An article in 2002 in the New York Times by Alan Riding stated "The power of the images comes less from their formal beauty than from the way they envelop the viewer in their mood. . . .They are simply windows to a world in which silence and patience govern time."

== Nomadic Museum ==
Gregory Colbert’s Nomadic Museum is a purpose-built temporary structure imagined by Japanese architect Shigeru Ban, used to house his traveling Ashes and Snow film and photography exhibition. Just as Colbert aims, in his films and photographs to depict a world without hierarchy between species, a place where there is no "other," he intends the Nomadic Museum to be inclusive, not elitist, a democratic expression of the wonder of nature that is accessible by visitors of all cultural and social backgrounds.

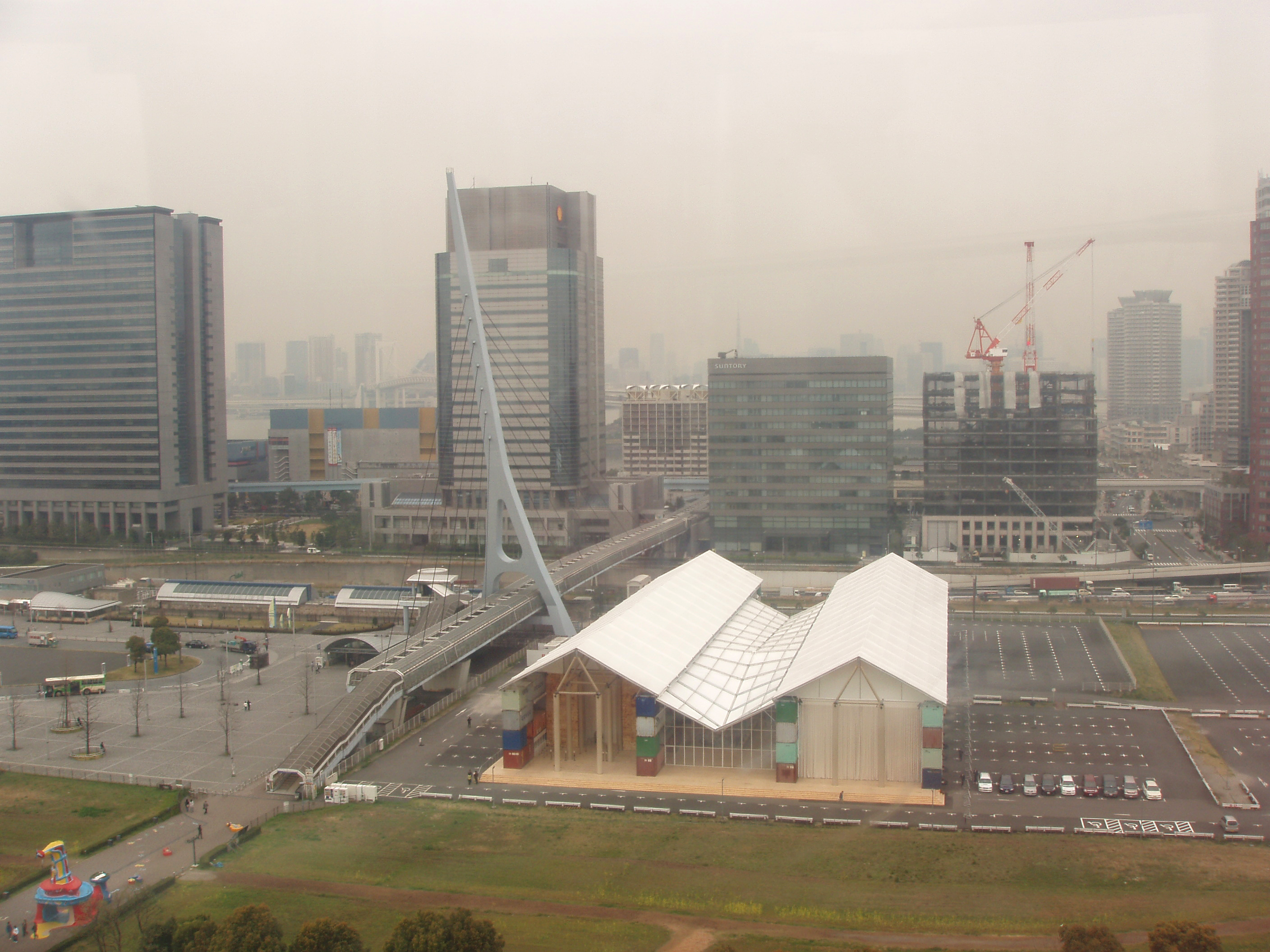
Nomadic Museum in Tokyo, 2007

To share his photographs and films, Colbert imagined a structure that could easily be assembled in ports of call around the world, providing an ephemeral environment for his work. He envisioned a building that would be the architectural equivalent of open arms, a place that would welcome rather than intimidate visitors, and would emerge seamlessly from the world of the images themselves. The Nomadic Museum resolves the disconnect that often exists between an artist’s work and the environment in which it is presented.

A review of the first Nomadic Museum in Modern Painter stated, "The Nomadic Museum restores the possibility of wonder to museums whose excesses of clarity and light have banished the shadows. The power of the show and the power of the building are so reciprocal that it is difficult to separate the dancer from the dance…In these agnostic and cynical times, the building becomes a place to feel and even believe. Ashes and Snow is a show that is disarmingly, and grandly, simple." The Wall Street Journal commented, "His astonishing pictures—sepia and umber in tone…documented the whole caravan of beauteous creatures who had passed before his magic lens…For all its apparent sobriety, this is an ecstatic space; as for the installation, it is Zen…It’s like a Rothko chapel writ large."

The Nomadic Museum is chartered to travel the globe with no final destination.

== Awards ==
• "Best Curator of the Year" at the 2006 Lucie Awards.

• Ashes and Snow was nominated for a special prize at the 2007 Venice Film festival.

• Colbert was named the honorary ambassador of culture and tourism to Mexico in 2008.

• In 2016, Colbert was honored to be named one of the World's Most Innovative People at the World Summit on Innovation and Entrepreneurship, which was held at the United Nations as a partnership between with the United Nations Conference on Trade & Development (UNCTAD).

== Quotes ==
"I have been tusked by an elephant, almost eaten by a sperm whale, knocked off my feet by a rhinoceros, embraced by a jaguar, given a haircut by a tiger shark, chased by a hippo and a black mamba, brought to my knees by malaria and dengue. But I was able to avoid the greatest danger of all. Never stop exploring the things that open you, or that you love."

"When I started Ashes and Snow in 1992, I set out to explore the relationship between man and animals from the inside out. In discovering the shared language and poetic sensibilities of all animals, I am working towards restoring the common ground that once existed when people lived in harmony with animals."

"Every culture from the Egyptians to the Mayans to the American Indians to the Bedouins created bestiaries that enabled them to express their relationship with nature. Ashes and Snow is a 21st-century bestiary filled with species from around the world. Nature’s orchestra includes not just Homo sapiens but elephants, whales, manatees, eagles, cheetahs, orangutans, and many others."
