= Simón Vélez =

Colombian architect

- Born: 2 February 1949 (age 77); Manizales, Colombia
- Occupation: Architect
- Awards: The Principal Prince Claus Awards (2009)
- Buildings: The Nomadic Museum
- Website: www.simonvelez.net

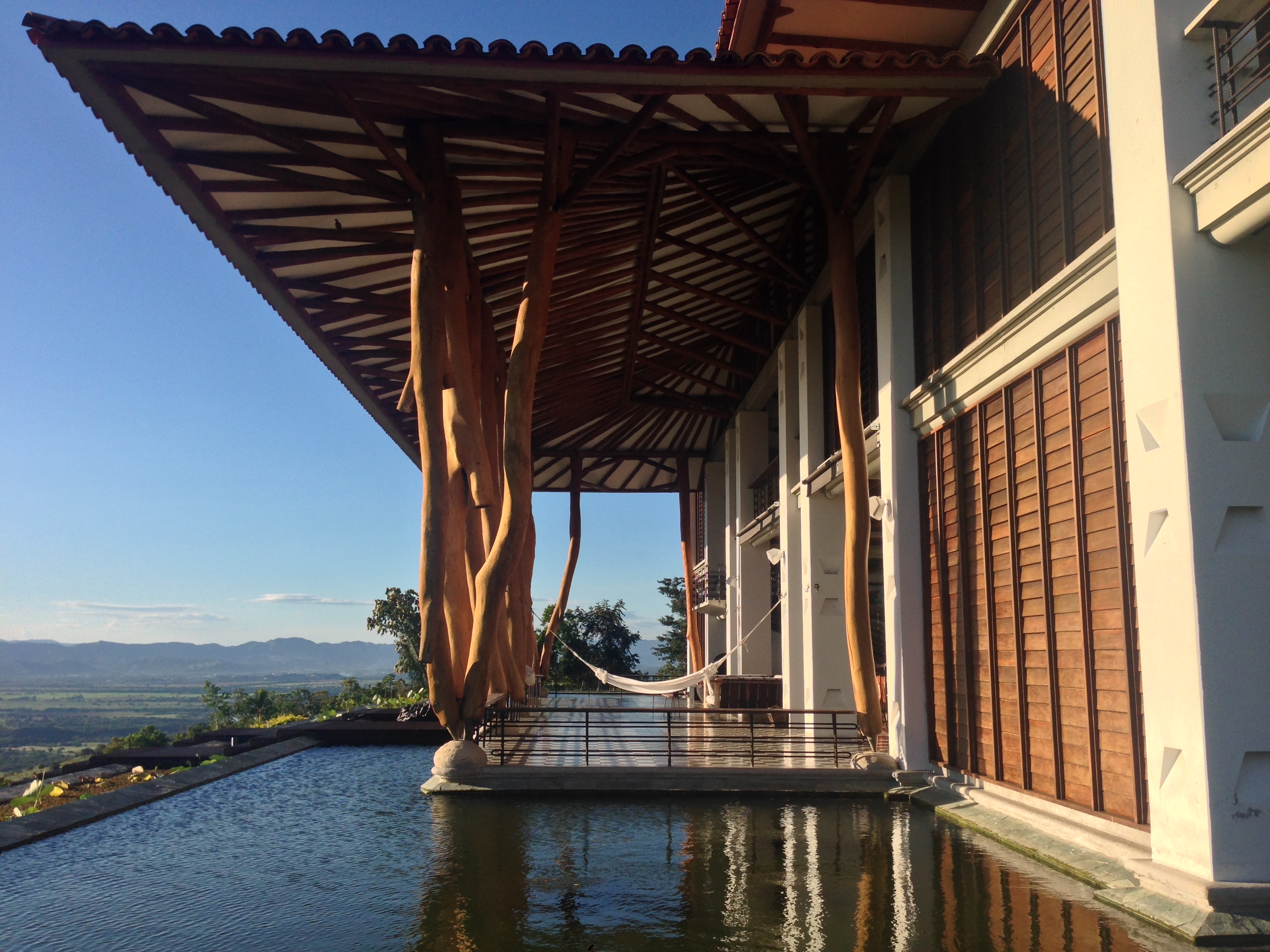
Private home designed by Simon Velez.

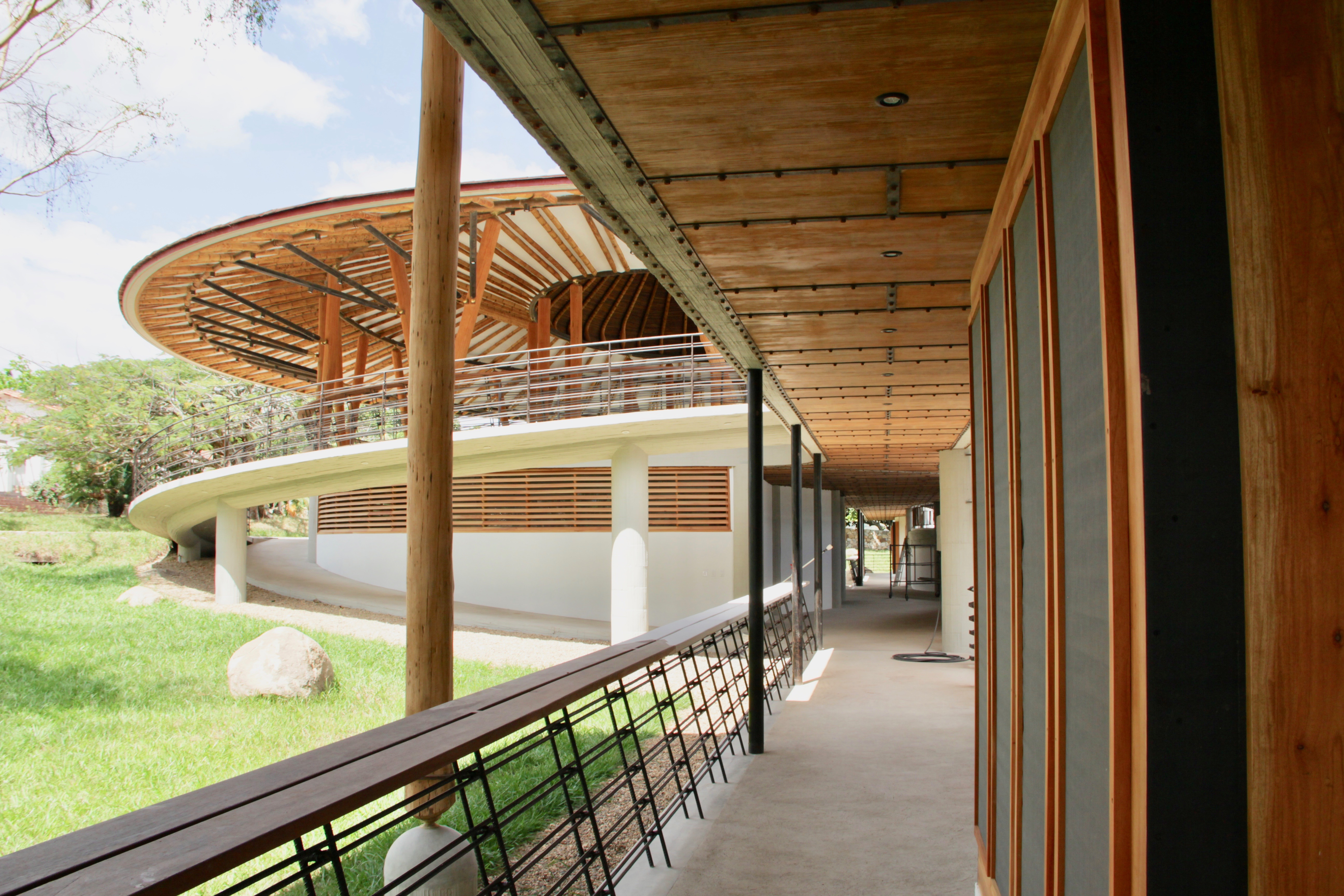
Private home designed by Simon Velez.

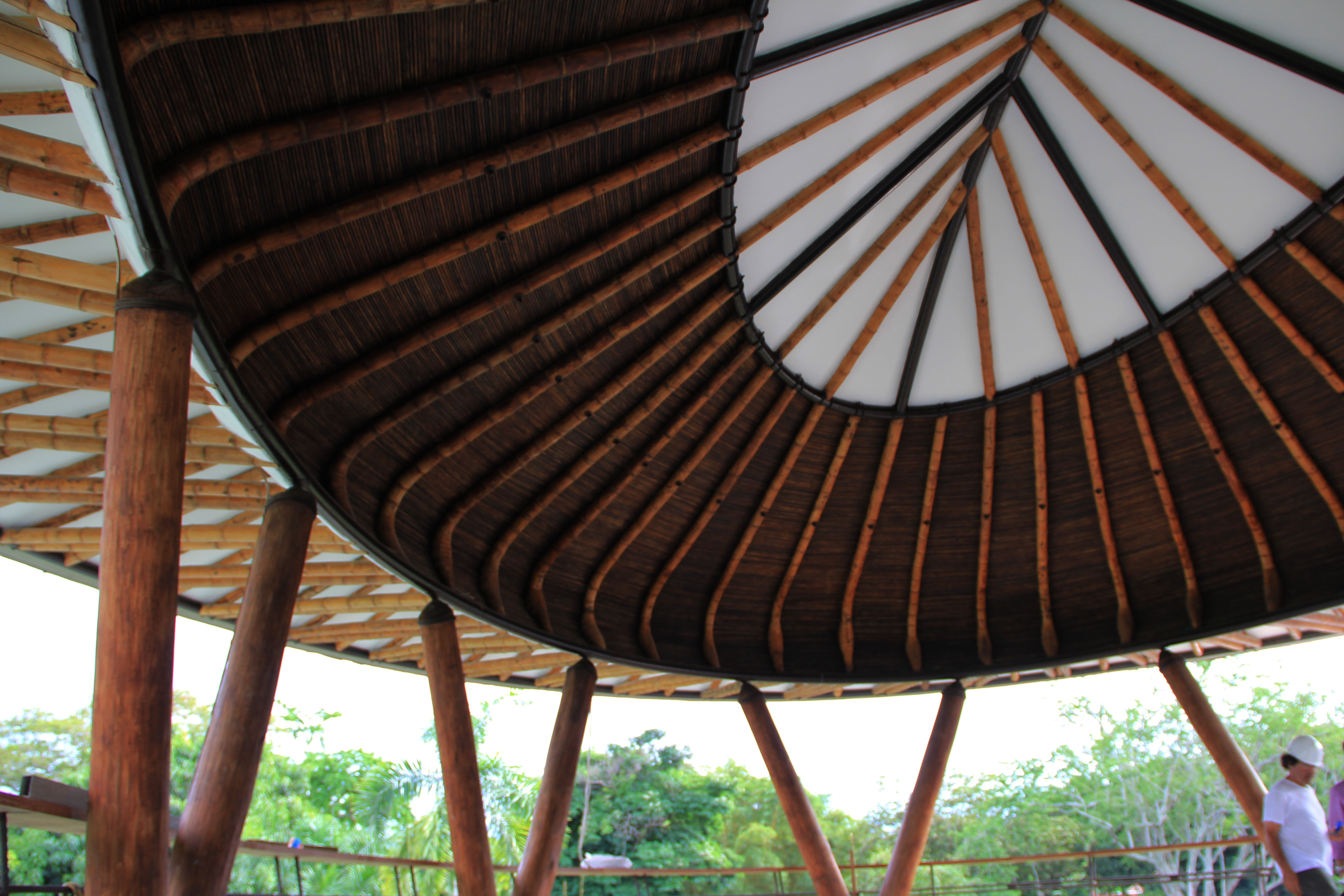
Kiosk designed by Simon Velez.

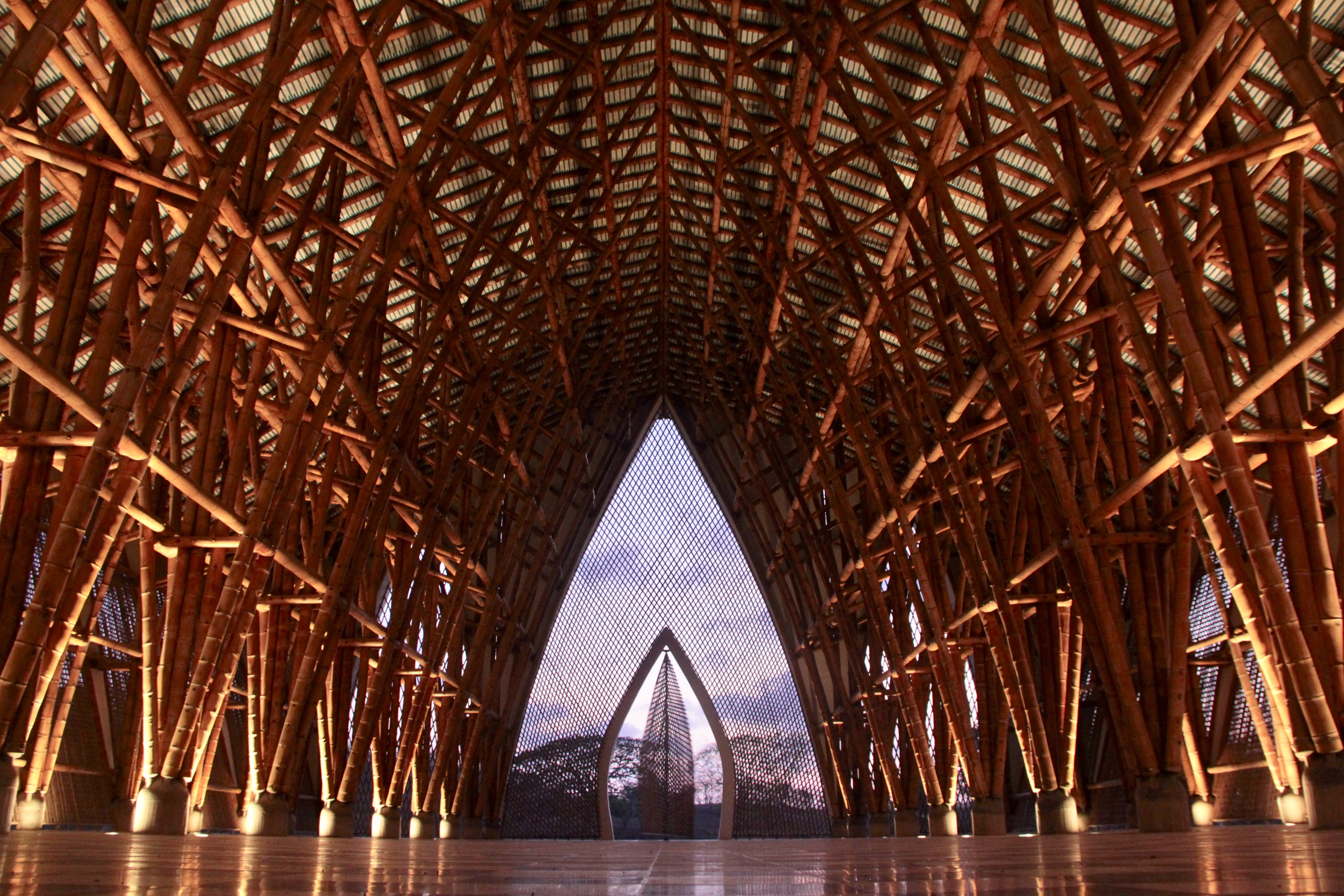
Spiritual Temple designed by Simon Velez.

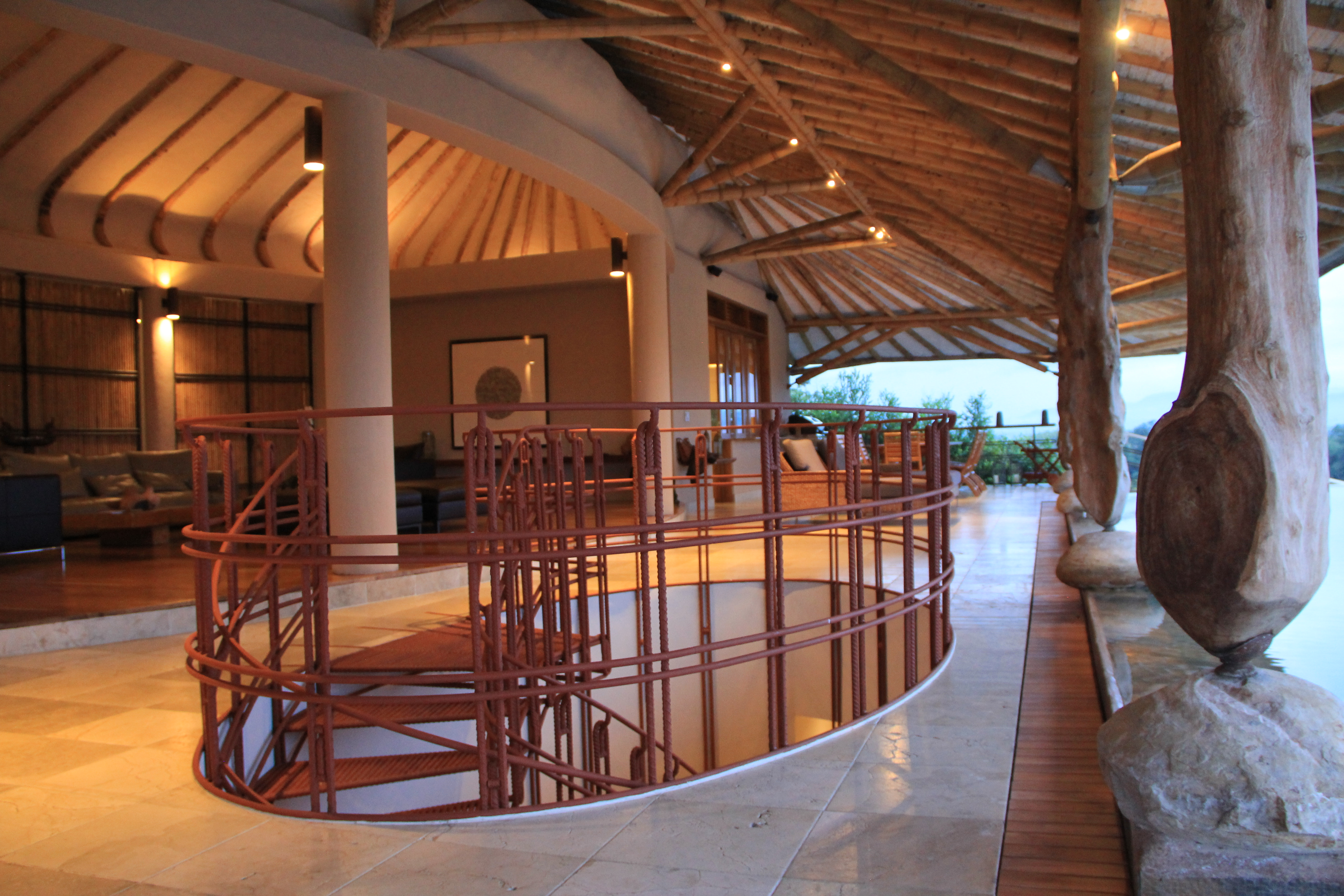
Private home designed by Simon Velez.

Simón Vélez is a prize-winning architect and thinker from Colombia, most famous for his innovative use of Guadua bamboo as an essential building component. Vélez was born in Manizales, Colombia, in 1949. His father and grandfather were also architects. He has designed buildings in over 11 countries.

== About ==
Simón Vélez created joinery systems that utilize bamboo as a permanent structural element in both residential and commercial structures. For four consecutive years he has been invited by the Vitra Design Museum and the Georges Pompidou Center to conduct workshops in France in which structures of bamboo-guadua were built as an instructive exercise. He has led workshops around the world in bamboo joinery and assemblage systems.

For Expo Hanover 2000, he designed and constructed a 2000-square-meter bamboo pavilion for ZERI Foundation (Zero Emissions Research and Initiative). The structure utilized bamboo, recycled cement, copper, and a mixture of terracotta, cement and bamboo fiber panels. It was the first time in history that a bamboo structure received a building permit in Germany. With 6.4 million visitors it became the most popular pavilion of the World Expo.

Vélez participated in designing Crosswaters Ecolodge, an ecotourism destination in China in the forests of Nankun Shan Mountain Reserve, in the Guangdong Province. It the largest project in the world to the use bamboo in a commercial project and the first project of this scale in Asia to use bamboo as a structural element in a dwelling. The project received the American Society of Landscape Architects 2006 Analysis and Planning Award of Honor.

Vélez has designed guadua bamboo buildings in Germany, France, the United States, Brazil, Mexico, China, Jamaica, Colombia, Panamá, Ecuador, and India. He designed the Zócalo Nomadic Museum in Mexico City, which houses Gregory Colbert's "Ashes and Snow."

In December 2009 he received 'The Principal Prince Claus Award' for his contribution to a positive interaction between culture and development. This prestigious Dutch award, founded by the Royal Prince Claus(†), has a price of €100,000. Since 1997 the Prince Claus Awards are presented annually to artists, thinkers and cultural organizations in Africa, Asia, Latin America and the Caribbean.

Collaborating with Sanjay Prakash, and in partnership with Pradeep Sachdeva, Simón Vélez participated in EXPO 2010 Shanghai China as part of the team for the Indian pavilion.

Vélez has designed some new exciting guadua bamboo buildings for Longquan International Biennale (LIB), which will be launched from the Municipality of Longquan, Zhejiang Province, located approximately 500 km south of Shanghai, PR China. The LIB is an architectural event staged every two years, in which architects of international stature are invited to build habitable buildings in a location of cultural and historical importance. The first LIB, which is due to open in November 2013, invited twelve internationally renowned architects to rise to the challenge.

== Major works ==
- 2018 Contemplation Bamboo Pavilion, Arles, France
- 2016 Marina and Restaurant, Islas Secas, Panama
- 2014 Social Housing Prototype (under construction)
- 2010 Indian Pavilion, EXPO Shanghai, China (design of bamboo structure)
- 2009 Temple of No Religion, Cartagena, Colombia
- 2008 Nomadic Museum, Zocalo de la Ciudad de Mexico
- 2005 Ecolodge Hotel. Guangzhou, China
- 2003 Jenny Garzon Pedestrian Bridge, Bogota, Colombia
- 2002 Cathedral of Our Lady of Poverty, Pereira, Colombia
- 2002 Reggae Stage, Ochorios, Jamaica
- 2000 ZERI Pavilion, EXPO Hannover, Germany

== Awards ==
- 2016 Invitation Venice Biennale - La Biennale di Venezia
- 2009 The Principal Prince Claus Awards
- 2006 Award of Honor in Analysis and Planning for “Crosswaters Ecolodge” - American Society of Landscape Architects
