= Faces of Ground Zero =

Photo exhibition

Faces of Ground Zero: A Photographic Tribute to America's Heroes was a traveling photo exhibition about the September 11 attacks. It was shown at several major cities in the United States, aiming to educate the public about the impact of modern urban terrorism. Faces of Ground Zero was one of the most widely seen exhibits about 9/11 and its aftermath.

The exhibit consisted of life-size photographs (9 ft × 4 ft framed images) of emergency workers, survivors, and relatives of victims of the attacks; some 272 people in all. (Some of the portraits included two or three subjects.) The aim was to capture the sense of loss, pain, and bravery of the time.

The touring exhibit was open to the public, free of charge. Made by photographer Joe McNally, in the Moby C Studio, a few blocks from the "Ground Zero" World Trade Center site in the immediate aftermath of 9/11, with "Moby C", the world's largest one-of-a-kind instant camera.

A hardcover companion photobook, Faces of Ground Zero: Portraits of the Heroes of September 11, 2001 (New York: Little, Brown & Co., 2002) was published to commemorate the project with a foreword by Rudy Giuliani and an original essay by McNally. A large percentage of the proceeds went to 9/11 charities.

== Exhibitions ==
Throughout 2002, Faces appeared at Vanderbilt Hall at Grand Central Terminal in Manhattan, Boston Public Library in Boston, The Royal Exchange in London, Union Station in Chicago, One Market Plaza in San Francisco, and the Skirball Cultural Center in Los Angeles. The exhibit returned to New York for the first anniversary of 9/11 and was shown at Rockefeller Center in Midtown Manhattan.

It was shown again on the fifth-anniversary of 9/11, when it appeared at the New York City Fire Museum in Lower Manhattan.

To mark the tenth-anniversary of 9/11, the Time Warner Center (10 Columbus Circle at 59th St.) presented an exhibition of more than 50 images from the collection with new images. (That exhibition was known as Faces of Ground Zero: 10 Years Later.)

== Publications ==
Many of the portraits of the exhibit later appeared in the following photobooks:

- One Nation: America Remembers September 11, 2001 (New York: Little, Brown & Co., 2001) — Hardcover
- In the Land of the Free: September 11 – and After (New York: Life Books, 2001) — Abridged Softcover Edition
- The American Spirit: Meeting the Challenge of September 11 (New York: Life Books, 2002) — Hardcover
- Faces of Ground Zero: Portraits of the Heroes of September 11, 2001 (New York: Little, Brown & Co., 2002) — Companion Photobook / Hardcover Edition
  - Faces of Ground Zero: Portraits of the Heroes of September 11, 2001 (Time, 2002) — Abridged Companion Photobook / Softcover Edition with Alternate Cover
- One Nation: America Remembers September 11, 2001 – 10 Years Later (New York: Little, Brown & Co., 2011) — Updated Expanded Edition with Alternate Cover
- In the Land of the Free: September 11, 2001 – 10 Years Later (New York: Life Books, 2011) — Abridged Softcover / Updated Expanded Edition

== General references ==
- "Faces of Ground Zero: A Tribute to America's Heroes - Photo Essays". Time.
- "Faces of Ground Zero". NPR.
