= Joe McNally (photographer) =

American photographer (born 1952)

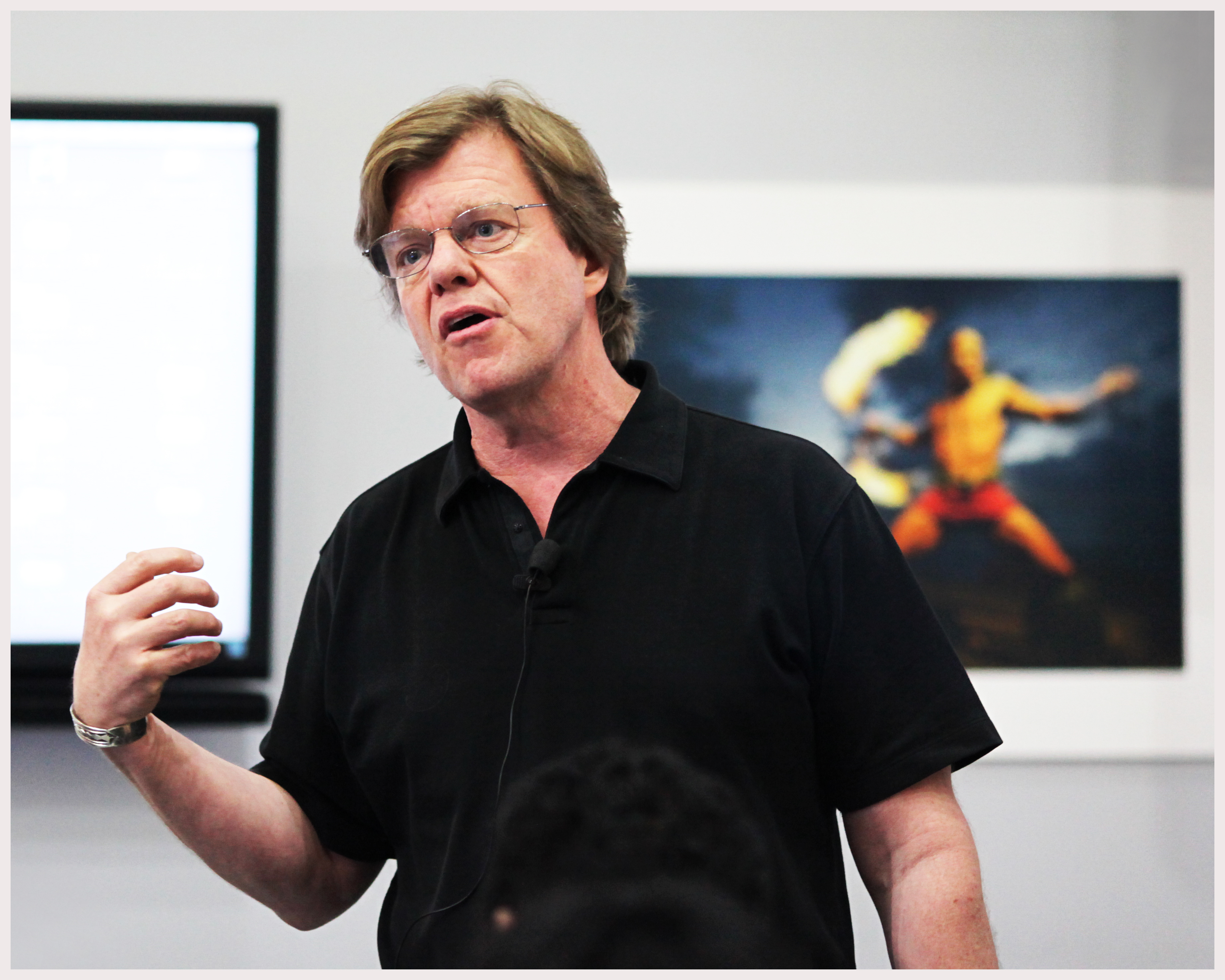
McNally

Joe McNally (born July 27, 1952) is an American photographer who has contributed to National Geographic. He is based out of New York City and resides in Ridgefield, Connecticut. He has won four awards from World Press Photo.

== Early life and education ==
McNally was born in Montclair, New Jersey. He went to High School at Iona Prep in New Rochelle, New York. He received his bachelor's and graduate degrees from the S. I. Newhouse School of Public Communications at Syracuse University.

== Career ==
From 1994 until 1998 McNally was Life magazine's staff photographer, the first one in 23 years. His most well known series is Faces of Ground Zero — Portraits of the Heroes of September 11th, a collection of 246 giant Polaroid portraits shot in the Moby C Studio near Ground Zero in a three-week period shortly after 9/11. A large group of these life-size (9' x 4') photos were exhibited in seven cities in 2002.

McNally has contributed for National Geographic magazine for many years. One of his photographic projects for the magazine was "The Future of Flying," a 32-page cover story, published in December 2003, commemorating the centennial observance of the Wright brothers' flight. This story was the first all digital shoot for the magazine. This issue was a National Magazine Award Finalist.

He has shot cover stories for Sports Illustrated, Time, Newsweek, Geo, Fortune, New York, Business Week, Life and Men's Journal.

He is known for flash photography.

== Publications ==
- Faces of Ground Zero. Portraits of the Heroes of September 11, 2001. New York City: Little, Brown and Company, 2002. ISBN 978-0316523707.
- The Moment It Clicks: Photography secrets from one of the world's top shooters. San Francisco: New Riders, 2008. ISBN 978-0321544087.
- The Hot Shoe Diaries: Big Light from Small Flashes: Creative Applications of Small Flashes. San Francisco: New Riders, 2009. ISBN 978-0321580146.
- Sketching Light: An Illustrated Tour of the Possibilities of Flash. San Francisco: New Riders, 2011. ISBN 978-0321700902.
- The Real Deal: Field Notes from the Life of a Working Photographer. San Rafael: Rocky Nook, 2022. ISBN 978-1681988016.

== Awards ==
- 1996: Third prize singles, People in the News, World Press Photo, Amsterdam
- 1997: First prize singles, Portraits, World Press Photo, Amsterdam
- 1998: Third prize stories, Arts and Entertainment, World Press Photo, Amsterdam
- 1998: Alfred Eisenstaedt Award for magazine photography
- 2000: Second prize stories, Science & Technology, World Press Photo, Amsterdam
- 2010: Third place, Science/Natural History Picture Story, Pictures of the Year International
